= Belišće =

- Town
- Grad Belišće; Town of Belišće
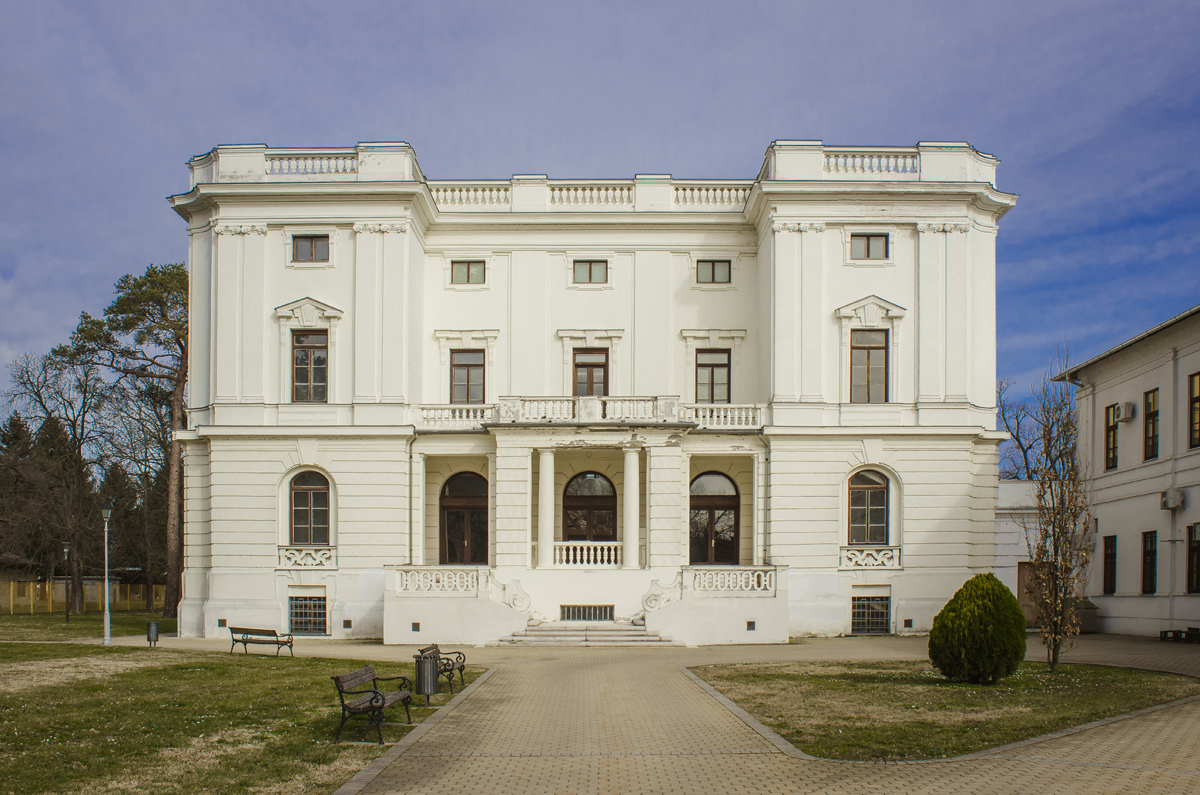
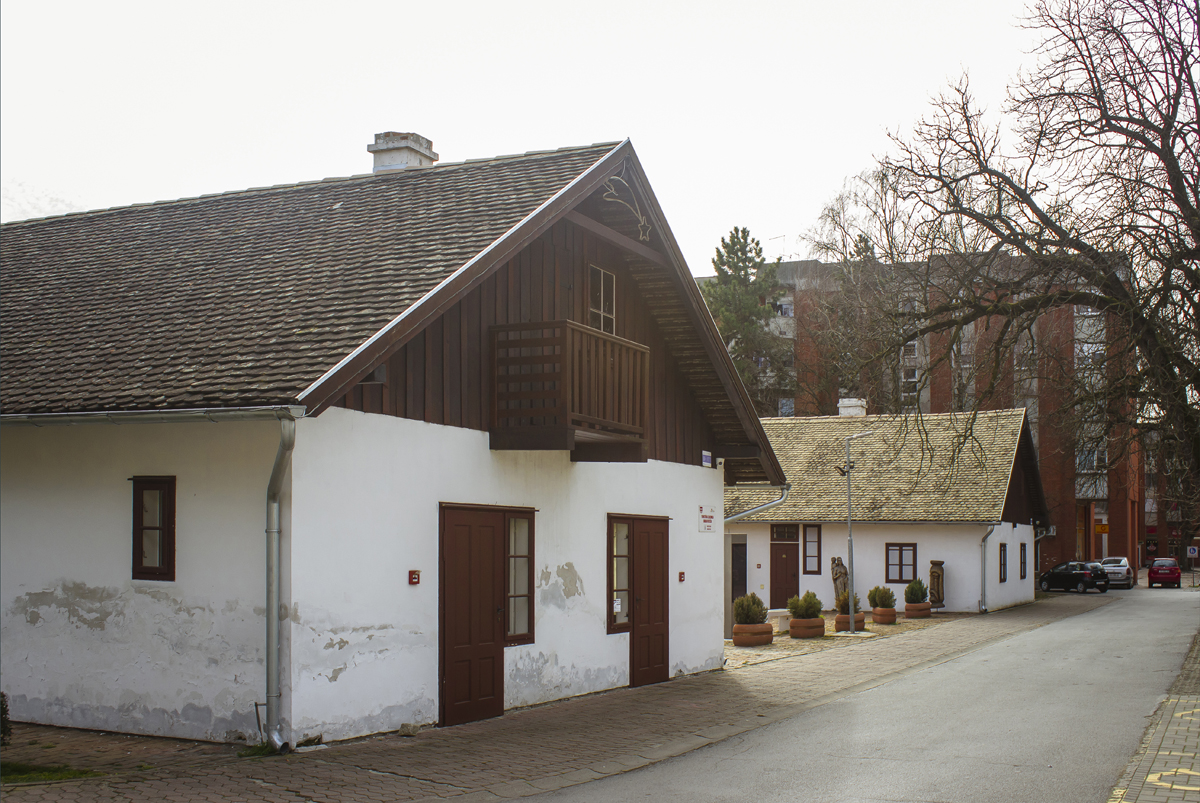
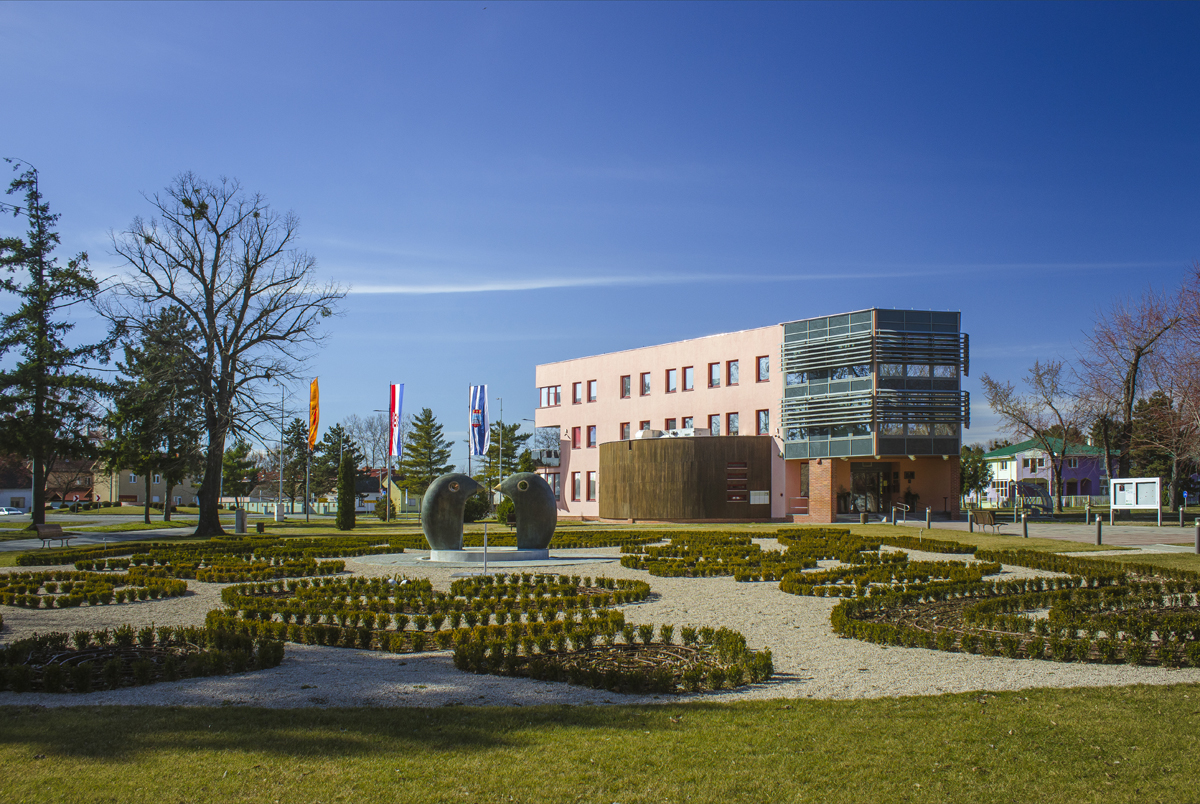
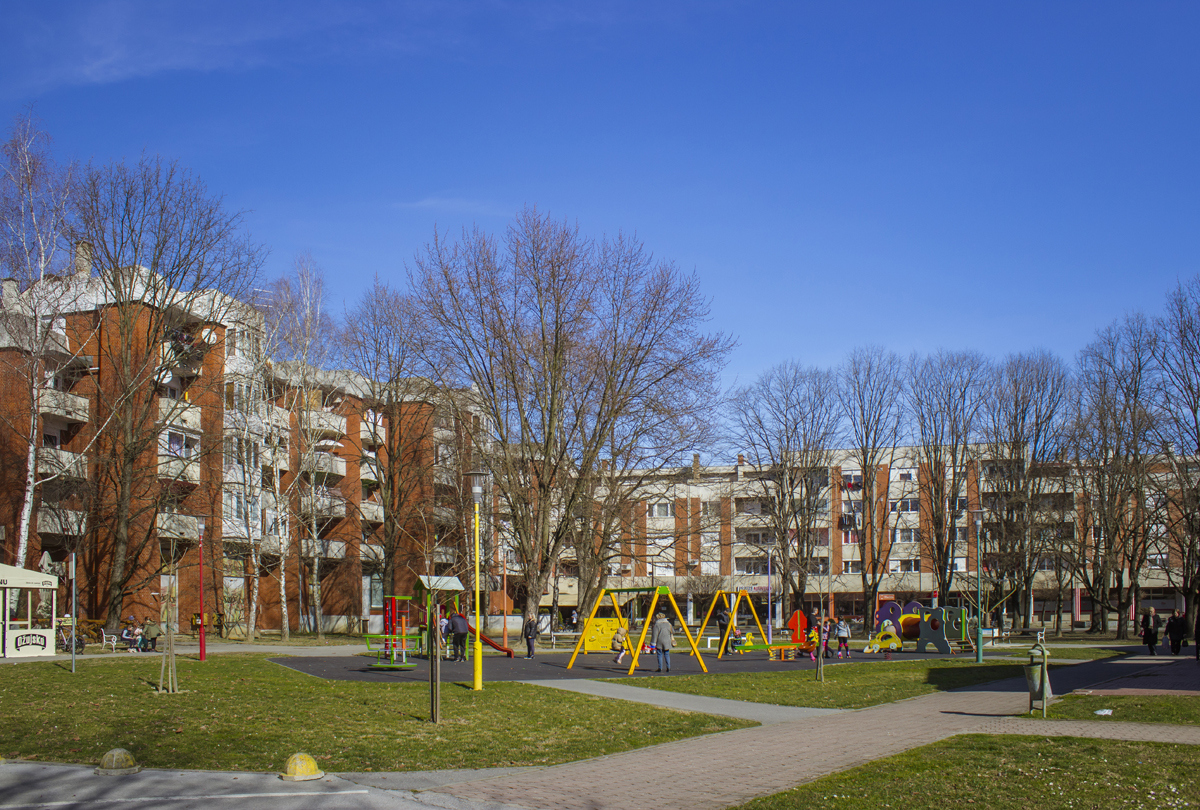
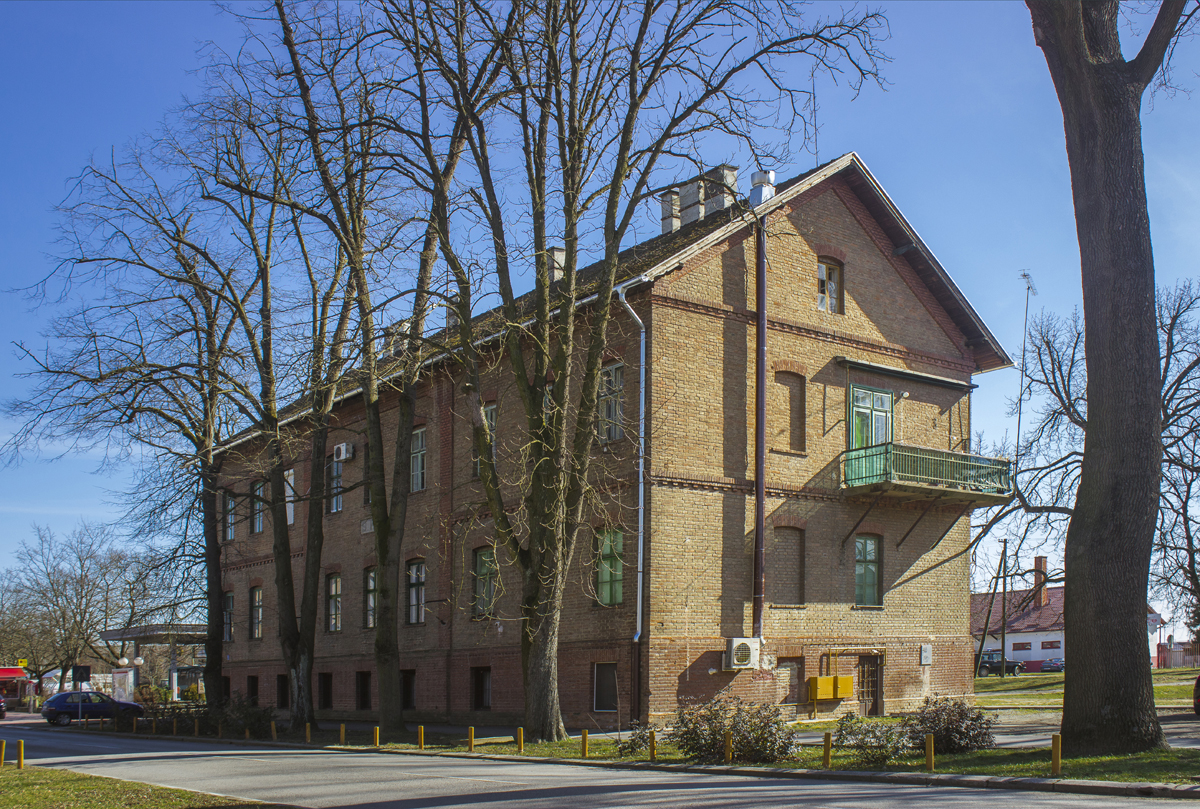
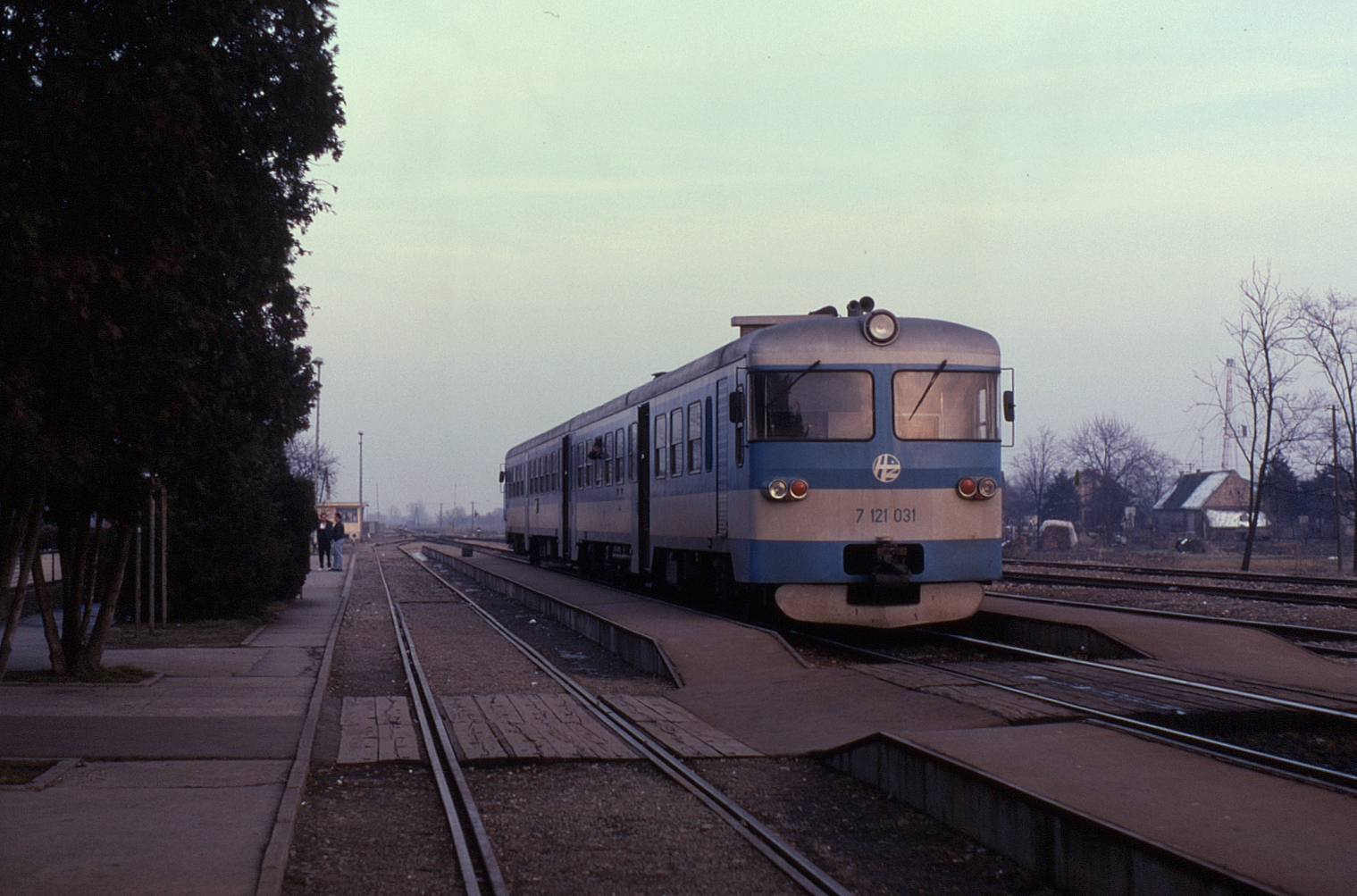
- Belišće

- Location of Belišće in Osijek-Baranja County Belišće (Croatia) Belišće (Europe)
- Coordinates: 45°41′N 18°24′E
- Country: Croatia
- Region: Baranja (Podunavlje)
- County: Osijek-Baranja County

Government
  - Mayor: Ivana Jerbić (Ind.)

Area
  - Town: 70.2 km^{2} (27.1 sq mi)
  - Urban: 5.2 km^{2} (2.0 sq mi)

Population (2021)
  - Town: 8,884
  - Density: 127/km^{2} (328/sq mi)
  - Urban: 5,354
  - Urban density: 1,000/km^{2} (2,700/sq mi)
- Time zone: UTC+1 (Central European Time)
- Postal code: 31551
- Vehicle registration: OS
- Website: belisce.hr

Belišće (pronounced [bɛ̌liːʃtɕɛ]) (Serbian Cyrillic: Белишће, Hungarian: Belistye) is a town in Croatia, located in the region of Slavonia, Osijek-Baranja County, at the altitude of 93 m. The population of the town is 6,518 (2011), with 10,825 in the municipality. In 2011 census, the majority were Croats. This industrial town upon the Drava river lies near the border with Hungary north from here.

Chief occupations are forestry, timber and wood processing, (sawmill, chemical and mechanical wood processing), corrugated fiberboard, metal industry, chemicals and synthetic material processing.

The influential Gutmann family made a significant impact on the Belišće region in the 19th and 20th centuries. Once vast Slavonian oak forests were mostly replaced with farmland, and a section of the working-class quarters of Salamon H. Gutmann from 1884 became part of the present-day Belišće.

Major recreational activities include angling, rowing kayak and canoe on the Drava river and its backwaters and hunting in the broader surroundings.

The settlements in the administrative area are:

- Belišće, population 6,518
- Bistrinci, population 1,598
- Bocanjevci, population 457
- Gat, population 705
- Gorica Valpovačka, population 165
- Kitišanci, population 150
- Tiborjanci, population 291
- Veliškovci, population 685
- Vinogradci, population 256
Town of Belišće: Population trends 1857–2021
v

population	3150	3137	3013	4378	5384	5441	5706	6664	7714	8322	9723	10938	11524	12456	11786	10825	8884
	1857	1869	1880	1890	1900	1910	1921	1931	1948	1953	1961	1971	1981	1991	2001	2011	2021

Sources: Croatian Bureau of Statistics publications

== Politics ==
=== Minority councils ===
Directly elected minority councils and representatives are tasked with consulting the local or regional authorities to advocate for minority rights and interests, integration into public life and participation in the management of local affairs. At the 2023 Croatian national minorities councils and representatives elections Roma and Serbs of Croatia each fulfilled legal requirements to elect 15 members minority councils of the Town of Belišće but the elections for Serb council were not held due to the lack of candidates.

== Notable people ==
- Edmund Gutmann
- Viktor Gutmann
- Branko Mikasinovich
- Milenko Špoljarić (b.1967) former footballer, he played as a midfielder for Cypriot Apollon Limassol side during the 90s. He also obtained Cypriot citizenship and represented Cyprus at international level
