= Osijek-Baranja County =

County in eastern Croatia

Osijek-Baranja County Osječko-baranjska županija (Croatian)
- County
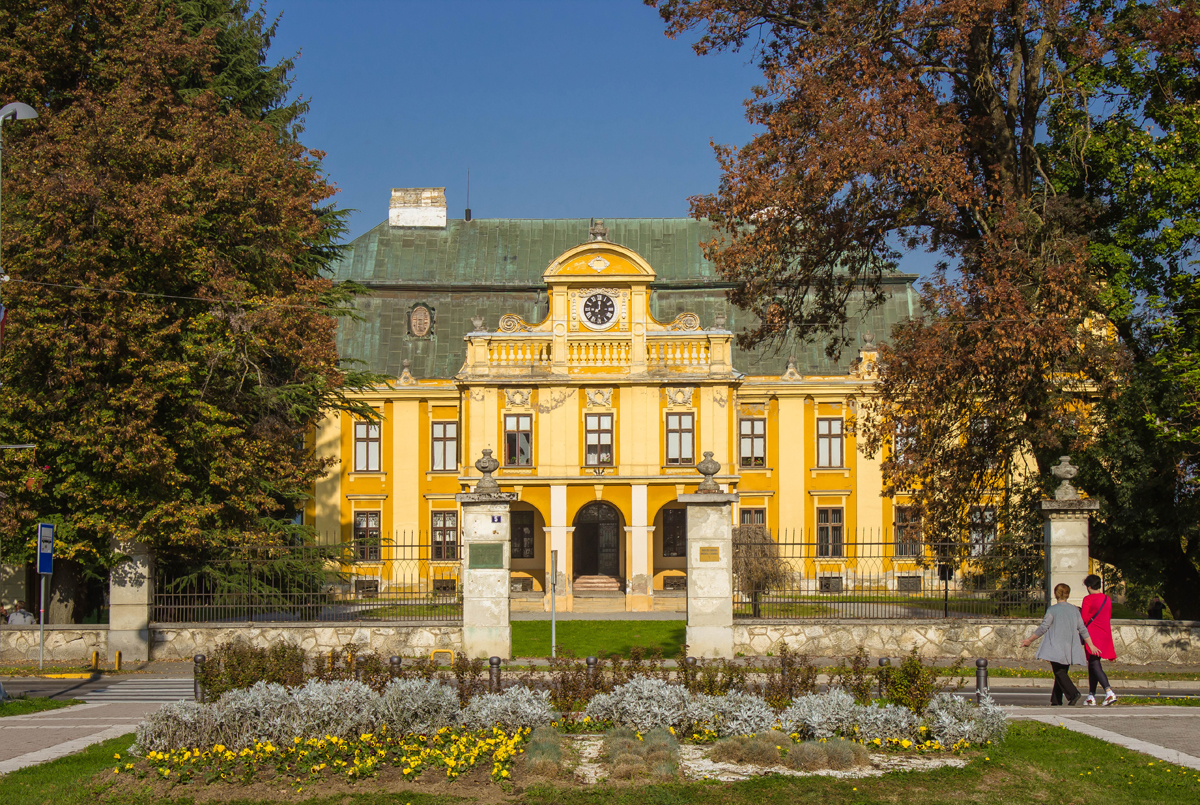
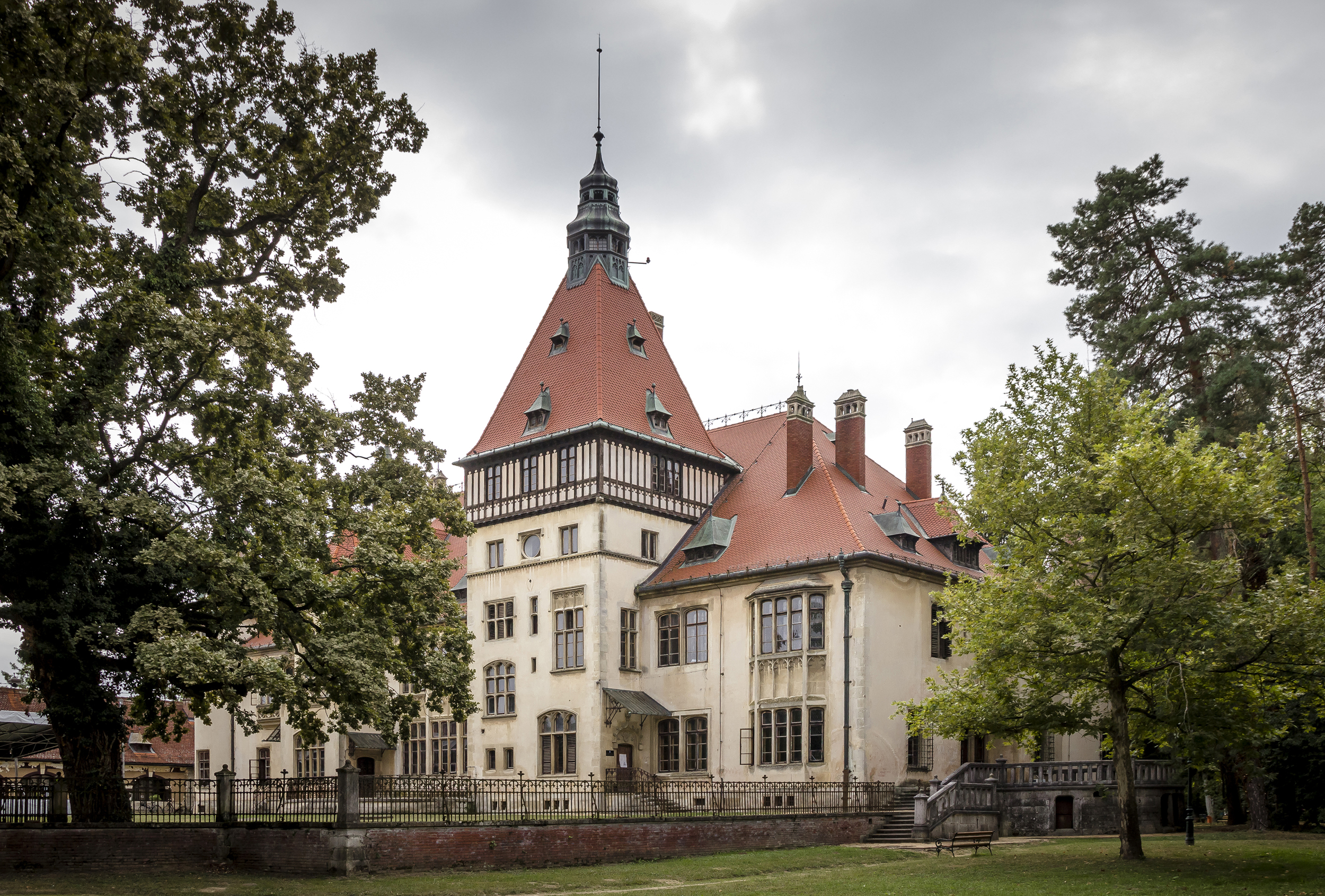
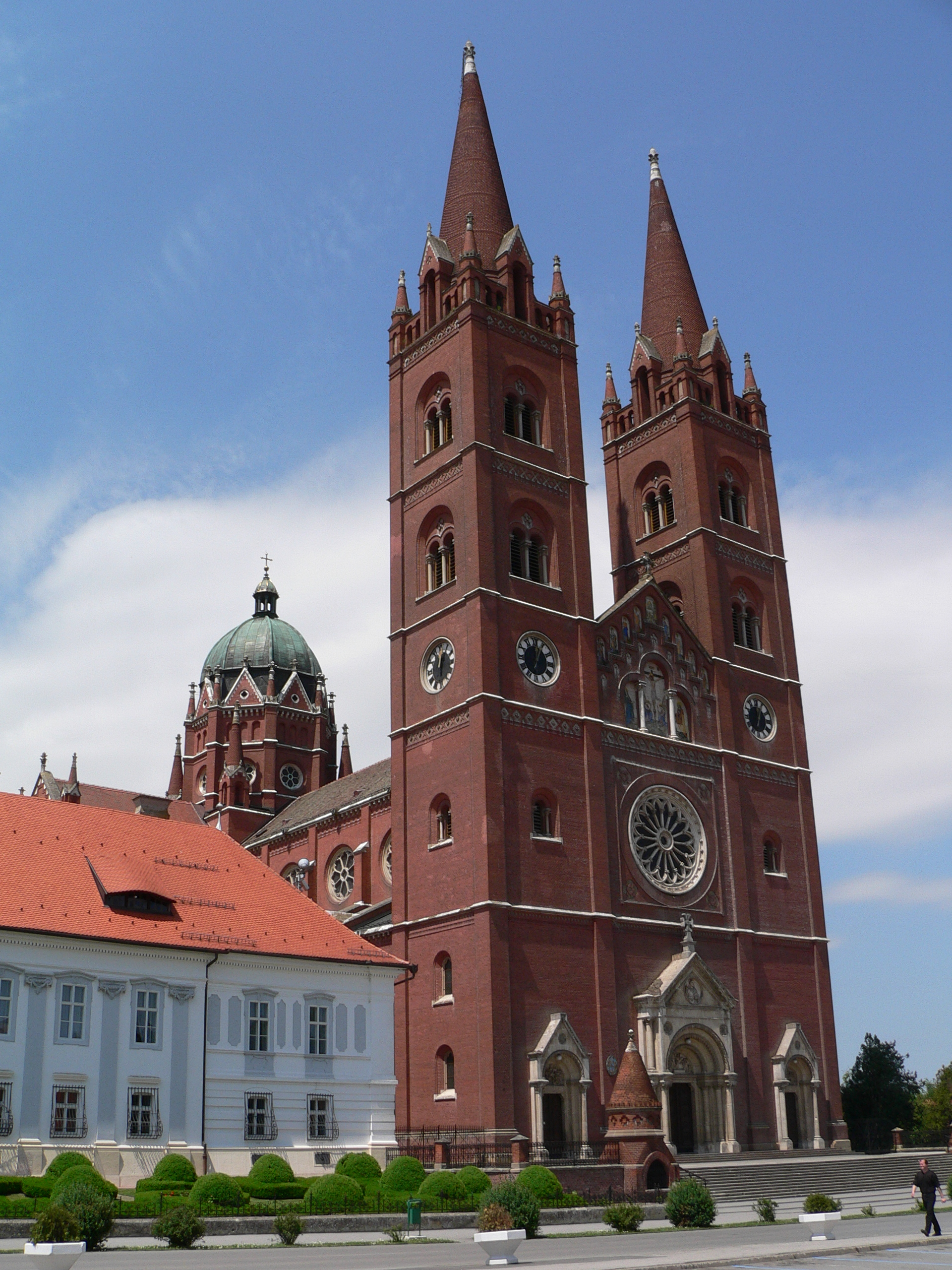
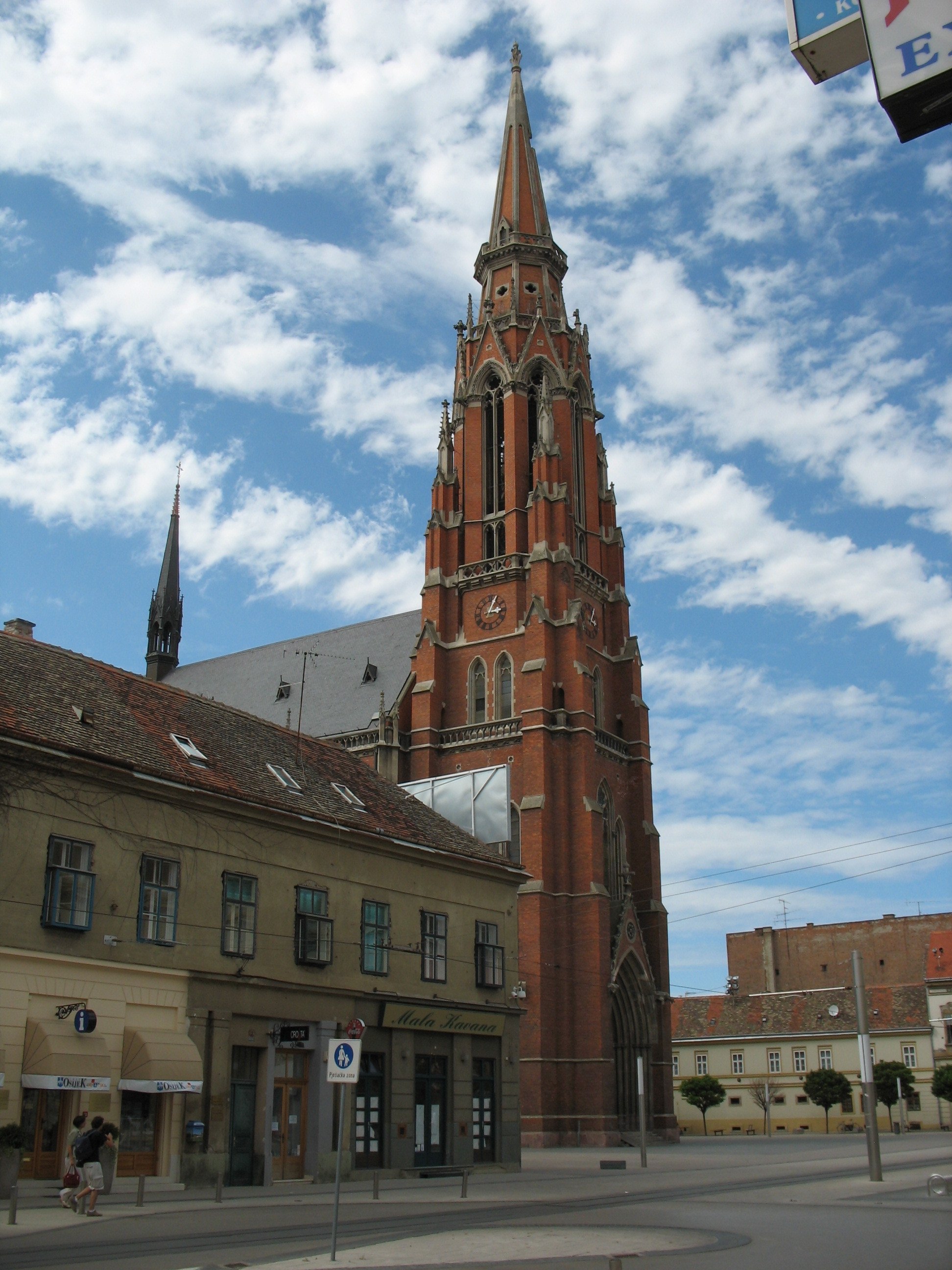
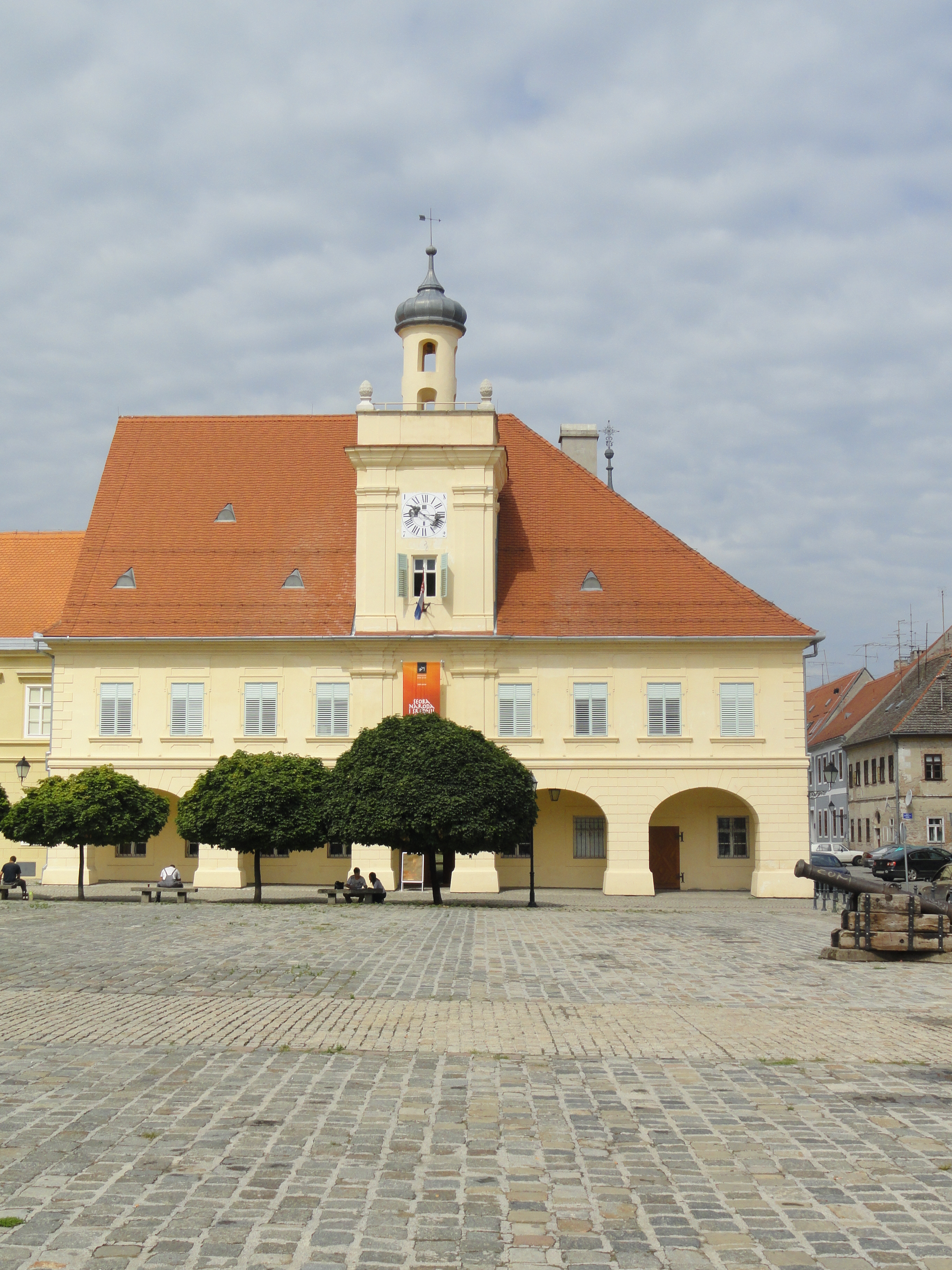
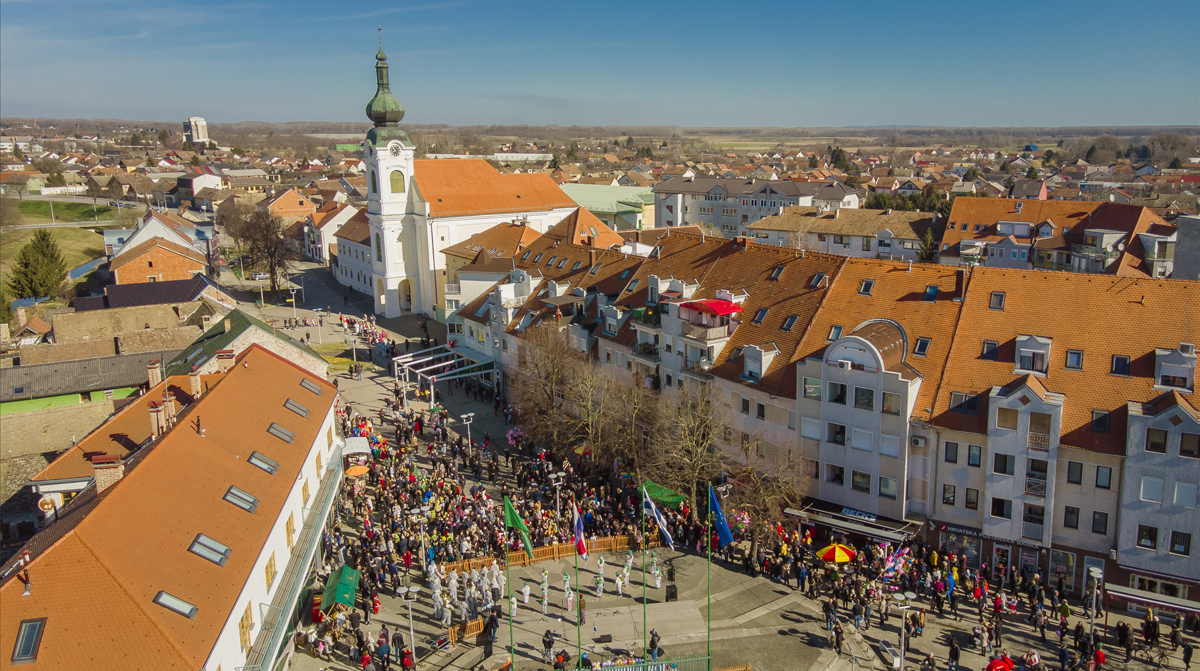
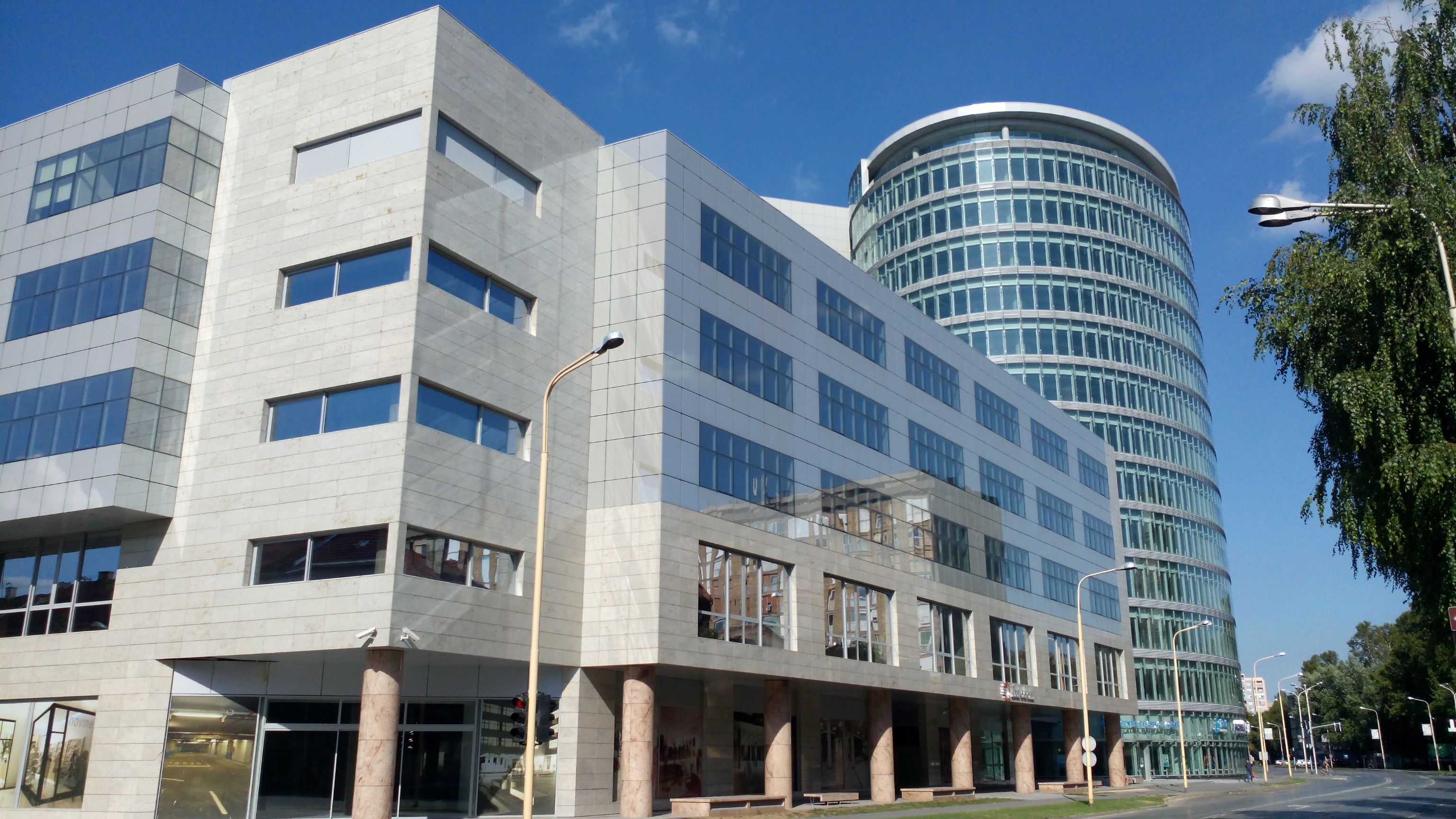
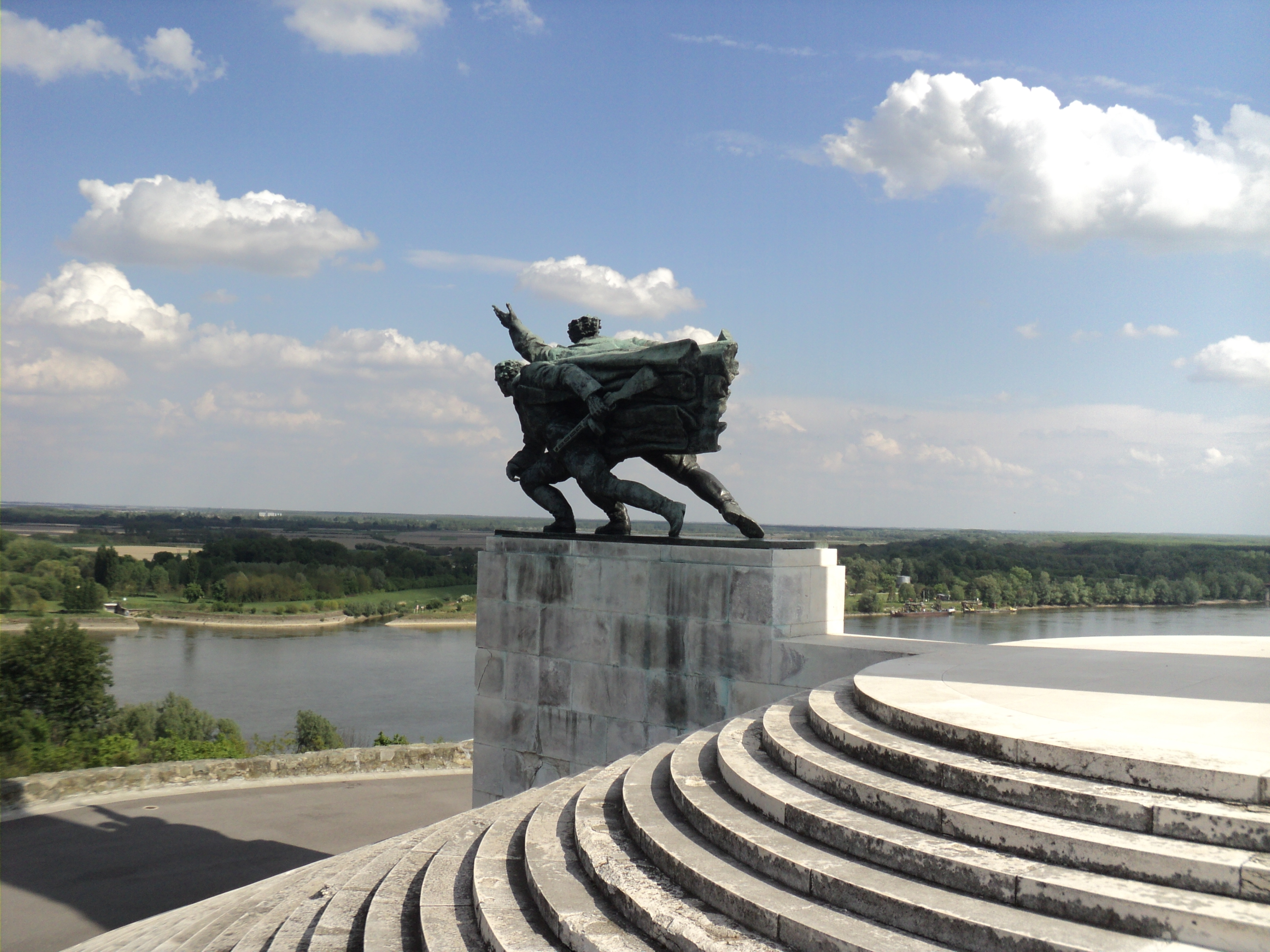
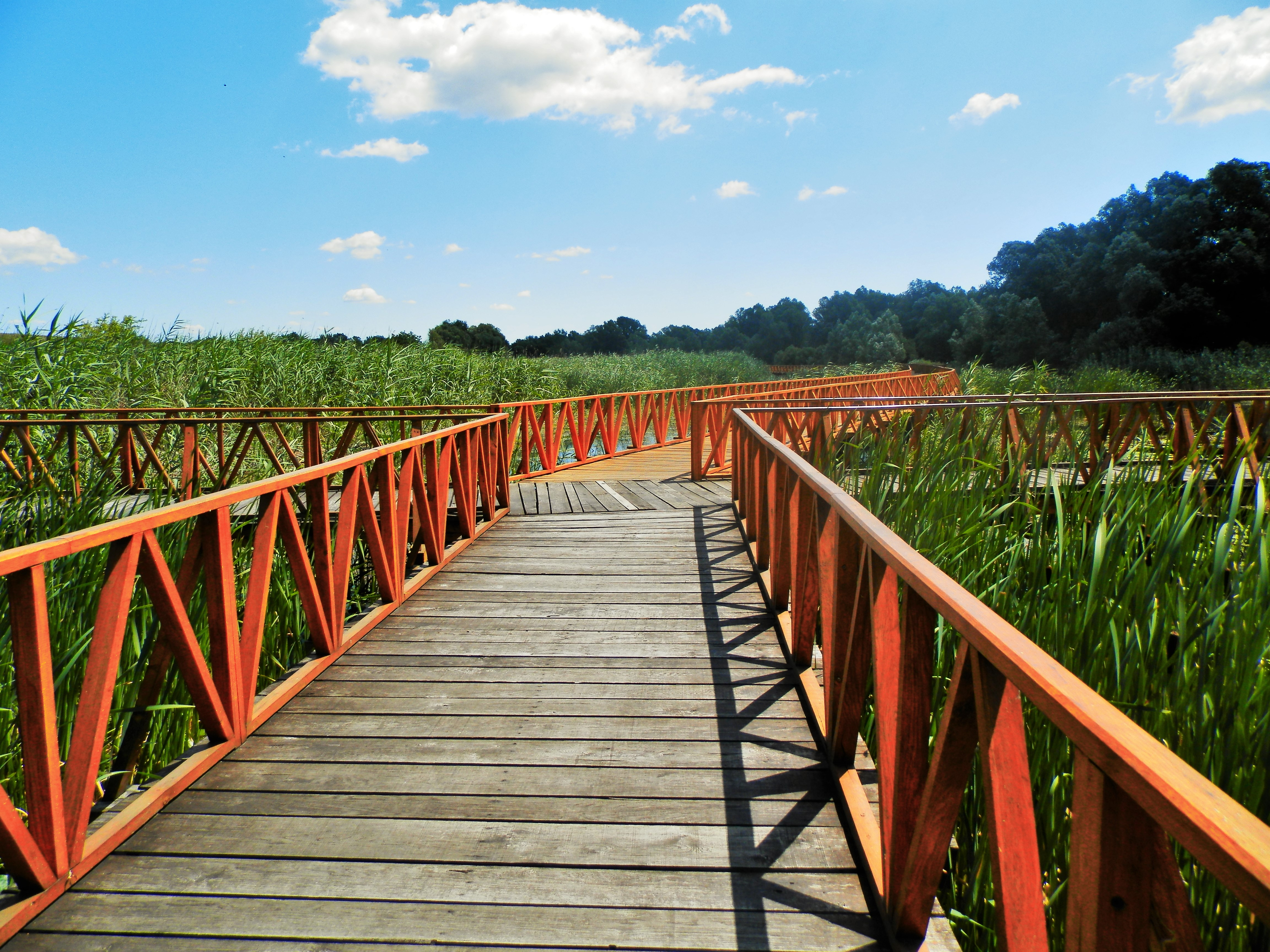

- Flag Coat of arms

- Osijek-Baranja County within Croatia
- Interactive map of Osijek-Baranja County
- Coordinates: 45°38′13″N 18°37′05″E
- Country: Croatia
- Seat: Osijek

Government
  - Župan (Prefect): Nataša Tramišak (HDZ)
  - Assembly: 55 members: • HDZ (24), HNS (3), HSS (2), HDSSB (2), HSLS (1), ABU (1) - (33); • Ind. Vladimir Šišljagić (9); • SDP (6); • MOST (4); • ŽZ (3)

Area
  - Total: 4,155 km^{2} (1,604 sq mi)

Population (2021)
  - Total: 258,719
  - Density: 62.27/km^{2} (161.3/sq mi)
- Area code: 031
- ISO 3166 code: HR-14
- HDI (2022): 0.857 very high · 9th
- Website: www.obz.hr

Osijek-Baranja County (pronounced [ôsijeːk bǎraɲa], Croatian: Osječko-baranjska županija, Hungarian: Eszék-Baranya megye) is a county in Croatia, located in northeastern Slavonia and Baranja which is defined part of the Pannonian Plain. Its center is Osijek. Other towns include Đakovo, Našice, Valpovo, Belišće, and Beli Manastir.

== History ==
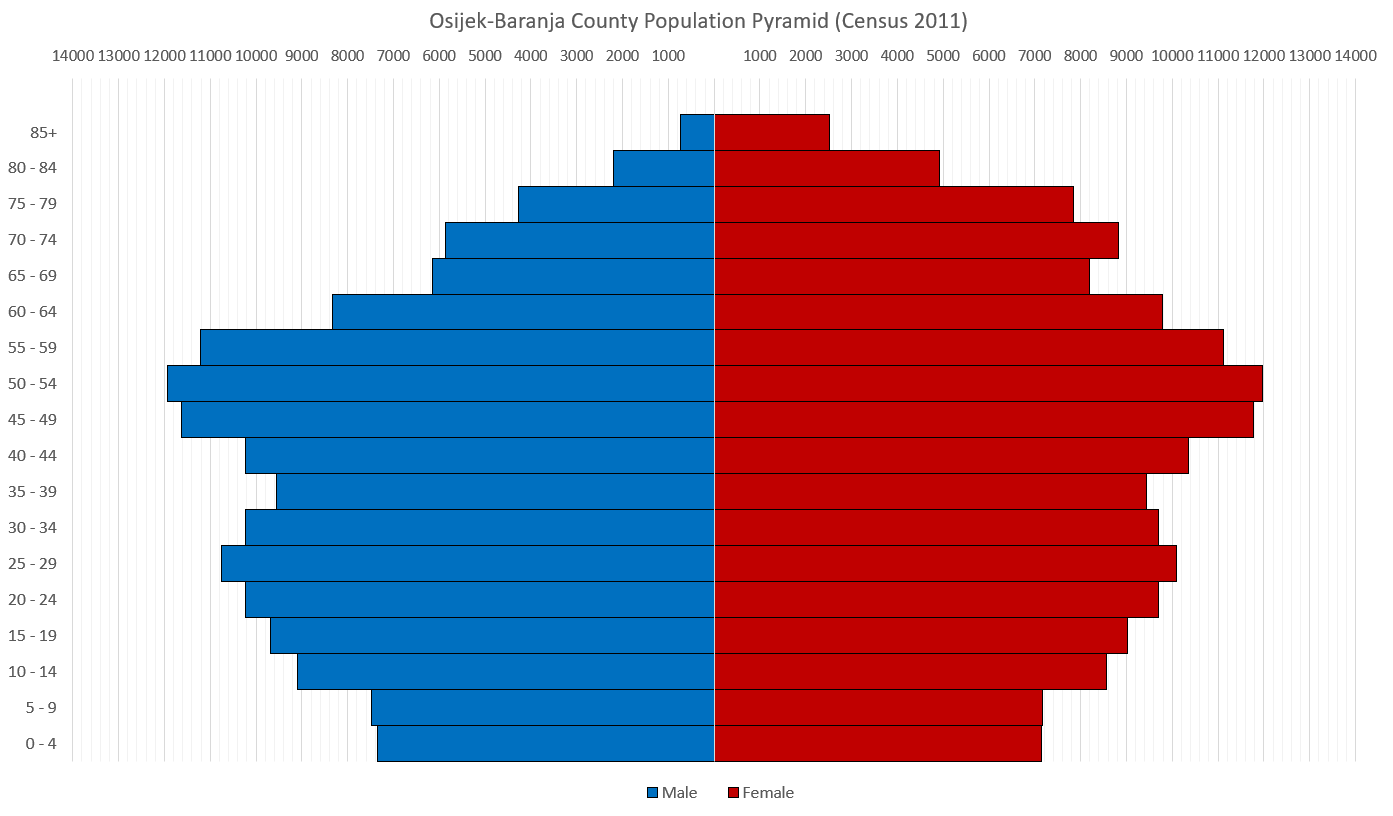
Population pyramid of Osijek-Baranja county per the 2011 Census

Osijek-Baranja County was established in 1992, with border changes in 1997.

== Stifolder ==
The Stifolder or Stiffoller Shvove are a Roman Catholic subgroup of the so-called Danube Swabians. Their ancestors arrived ca. 1717 - 1804 from the Hochstift Fulda and surroundings (Roman Catholic Diocese of Fulda), and settled in the Baranja area, such as in Jagodnjak, etc. They retained their own German dialect and culture, until the end of WW2. After WW2, the majority of Danube Swabians were expelled to Allied-occupied Germany and Allied-occupied Austria as a consequence of the Potsdam Agreement. Only a few people can speak the old Stiffolerisch Schvovish dialect. A salami is named after the people.

== Administrative divisions ==
=== Cities and towns ===
Municipality	Area (km²)	Population (2011 census)	Settlements
Beli Manastir	62.73	10,068	Beli Manastir, Branjin Vrh, Šećerana, Šumarina
Belišće	68.75	10,825	Belišće, Bistrinci, Bocanjevci, Gat, Gorica Valpovačka, Kitišanci, Tiborjanci, Veliškovci, Vinogradci
Donji Miholjac	134.63	9,491	Donji Miholjac, Golinci, Miholjački Poreč, Podgajci Podravski, Radikovci, Rakitovica, Sveti Đurađ
Đakovo	169.59	27,745	Budrovci, Đakovo, Đurđanci, Ivanovci Đakovački, Kuševac, Novi Perkovci, Piškorevci, Selci Đakovački, Široko Polje
Našice	204.55	16,224	Brezik Našički, Ceremošnjak, Crna Klada, Gradac Našički, Granice, Jelisavac, Lađanska, Lila, Londžica, Makloševac, Markovac Našički, Martin, Našice, Polubaše, Ribnjak, Rozmajerovac, Velimirovac, Vukojevci, Zoljan
Osijek	174.85	108,048	Brijest, Briješće, Josipovac, Klisa, Nemetin, Osijek, Podravlje, Sarvaš, Tenja, Tvrđavica, Višnjevac
Valpovo	142.66	11,563	Harkanovci, Ivanovci, Ladimirevci, Marjačanci, Nard, Šag, Valpovo, Zelčin

=== Municipalities ===
Municipality	Area (km²)	Population (2011 census)	Settlements
Antunovac	57	3,703	Ivanovac
Bilje		5,642	Kopačevo, Kozjak, Lug, Podunavlje, Tikveš, Vardarac, Zlatna Greda
Bizovac		4,507	Brođanci, Cerovac, Cret Bizovački, Habjanovci, Novaki Bizovački, Samatovci, Selci
Čeminac	72	2,909	Grabovac, Kozarac, Mitrovac, Novi Čeminac
Čepin	106	11,599	Beketinci, Čepinski Martinci, Ovčara, Čokadinci, Livana
Darda	94.24	6,908	Mece, Švajcarnica, Uglješ
Donja Motičina	52	1,647	Gornja Motičina, Seona
Draž	150	2,763	Batina, Duboševica, Gajić, Podolje, Topolje
Drenje	106.51	2,700	Borovik, Bračevci, Bučje Gorjansko, Kućanci Đakovački, Mandićevac, Paljevina, Podgorje Bračevačko, Potnjani, Preslatinci, Pridvorje, Slatinik Drenjski
Đurđenovac	121	6,750	Beljevina, Bokšić, Bokšić Lug, Gabrilovac, Klokočevci, Krčevina, Ličko Novo Selo, Lipine, Našičko Novo Selo, Pribiševci, Sušine, Šaptinovci, Teodorovac
Erdut	158	7,372	Aljmaš, Bijelo Brdo, Dalj
Ernestinovo	86		Laslovo, Divoš
Feričanci	46		Gazije, Valenovac, Vučjak Feričanački
Gorjani	53		Tomašanci
Jagodnjak	105	2,040	Bolman, Majške Međe, Novi Bolman
Kneževi Vinogradi	183	4,614	Jasenovac, Kamenac, Karanac, Kotlina, Mirkovac, Sokolovac, Suza, Zmajevac
Koška	122		Andrijevac, Branimirovac, Breznica Našička, Ledenik, Lug Subotički, Niza, Normanci, Ordanja, Topoline
Levanjska Varoš	136		Borojevci, Breznica Đakovačka, Čenkovo, Majar, Milinac, Musić, Ovčara, Paučje, Ratkov Dol, Slobodna Vlast
Magadenovac	112	1,936	Beničanci, Lacići, Kućanci, Malinovac, Šljivoševci
Marijanci	66		Bočkinci, Brezovica, Čamagajevci, Črnkovci, Kunišinci, Marjanski Ivanovci
Petlovac	93	2,405	Baranjsko Petrovo Selo, Luč, Novi Bezdan, Novo Nevesinje, Sudaraž, Širine, Torjanci, Zeleno Polje
Petrijevci	556	2,870	Satnica
Podravska Moslavina	44	1,186	Gezinci, Krčenik, Martinci Miholjački, Orešnjak
Podgorač	131		Bijela Loza, Budimci, Kelešinka, Kršinci, Ostrošinci, Poganovci, Razbojište, Stipanovci
Popovac	62.41	2,094	Branjina, Kneževo
Punitovci	39		Josipovac Punitovački, Jurjevac Punitovački, Krndija
Satnica Đakovačka	45		Gašinci, Satnica Đakovačka
Semeljci	57		Kešinci, Koritna, Mrzović, Vrbica
Strizivojna	36	2,515	Sikirevačko Merolino, Soljak
Šodolovci	78.72		Ada, Koprivna, Palača, Paulin Dvor, Petrova Slatina, Silaš
Trnava		1,600	Dragotin, Hrkanovci Đakovački, Kondrić, Lapovci, Svetoblažje
Viljevo	93		Blanje, Bockovac, Cret Viljevski, Ivanovo, Kapelna, Krunoslavlje
Viškovci	44	1,902	Forkuševci, Vučevci
Vladislavci	37	1,882	Dopsin, Hrastin
Vuka	35	1,200	Hrastovac, Lipovac Hrastinski

== Politics ==
=== County Assembly ===
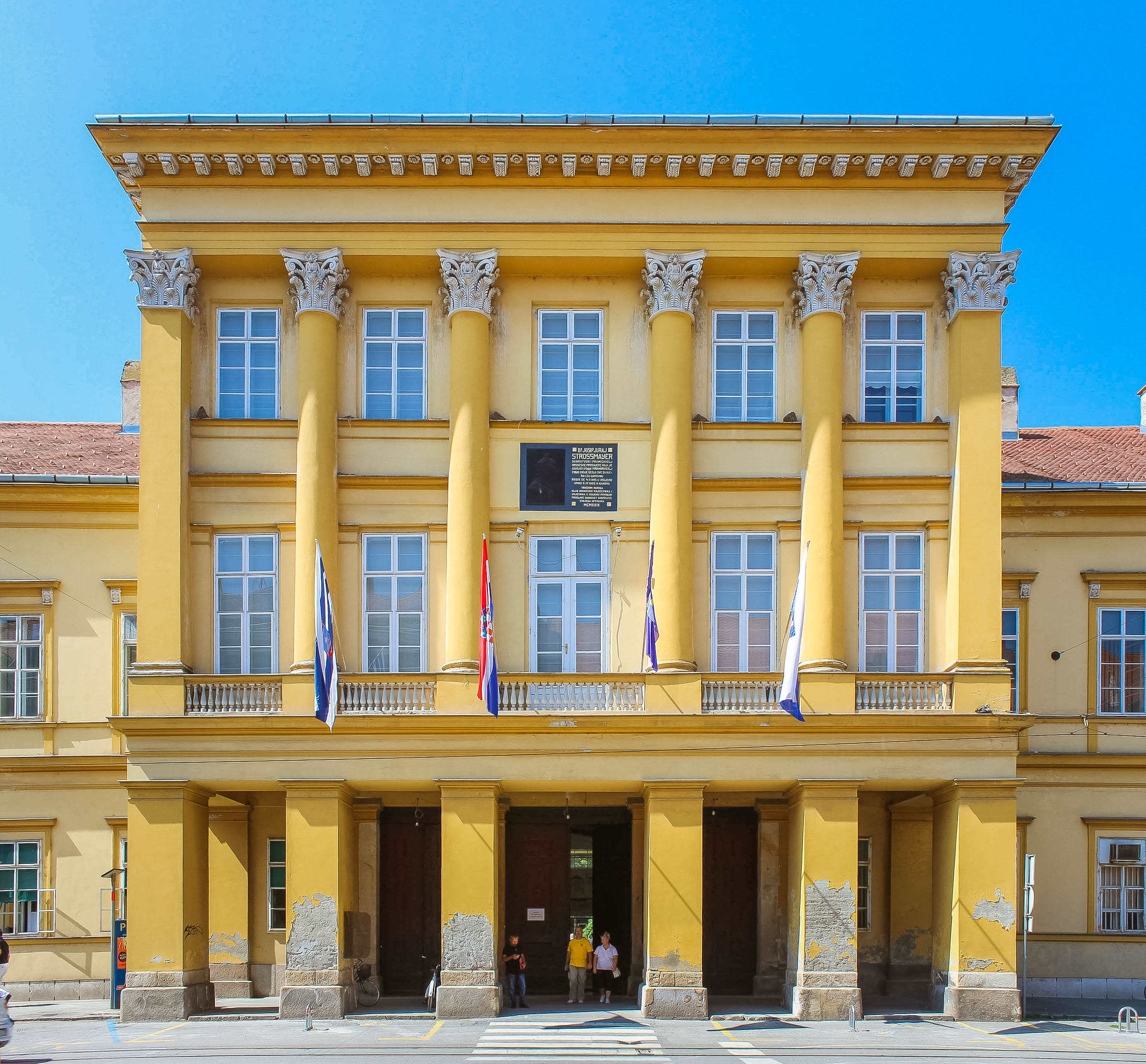
County Palace in Osijek

Following the 2025 Croatian local elections the Assembly of the Osijek-Baranja County was composed of 41 elected representatives. Out of a total of 233,684 eligible voters 94,407 (40.40%) participated in the elections and 94,3673 (40.38%) submitted their ballots. There were 89,515 (94.86%) valid and 4,852 (5.14%) invalid ballots.

The Croatian Democratic Union got 48,466 (54.14%) ballots and 24 elected representatives. The Social Democratic Party of Croatia in coalition with We Can! got 18,454 ballots (20.61%) and 9 elected representatives. The Home and National Rally in coalition with The Bridge, Croatian Sovereignists, Bloc Pensioners Together and Croatian Party of Rights got 8,983 ballots (10.03%) and 4 elected representatives.

Coalition of Croatian Democratic Alliance of Slavonia and Baranja, Croatian Peasant Party and Croatian Party of Pensioners got 5,723 ballots (6.39%) and 2 elected representatives which was the same number of representatives as in the case of the Coalition of Strength of Slavonia and Baranja, Croatian People's Party – Liberal Democrats, Republic and Croatian Peoples' Peasant Party which got 4,589 ballots (5.12%). Independent Democratic Serb Party got 3,300 ballots (3.68%) which was under the threshold to enter into the assembly.

In accordance with the Constitutional Act on the Rights of National Minorities in the Republic of Croatia in counties, cities, towns, and municipalities where the regular elections resulted in the underrepresentation of national minorities or ethnic Croats, additional elections were held on 5 October 2025. As Serbs of Croatia were underrepresented in the county assembly compared to their number in county's population they elected one additional representative from the Independent Democratic Serb Party. This increased the total number of elected representative to 42.

Summary of the 2025 Croatian local elections
Party	Votes	%	Seats
Croatian Democratic Union	48,466	54.14	24
Social Democratic Party of Croatia; We Can!	18,454	20.61	9
Home and National Rally; The Bridge; Croatian Sovereignists; Bloc Pensioners Together; Croatian Party of Rights	8,983	10.03	4
Croatian Democratic Alliance of Slavonia and Baranja; Croatian Peasant Party; Croatian Party of Pensioners	5,723	6.39	2
Coalition of Strength of Slavonia and Baranja; Croatian People's Party – Liberal Democrats; Republic; Croatian Peoples' Peasant Party	4,589	5.12	2
Independent Democratic Serb Party	3,300	3.68	0 +1 (additional elections)
Invalid/blank votes	4,852	5.14	—
Total	94,407	100	—
Registered voters/turnout	233,684	40.40	—
Source: (in Croatian)

=== Minority councils and representatives ===
Directly elected minority councils and representatives are tasked with consulting tasks for the local or regional authorities in which they are advocating for minority rights and interests, integration into public life and participation in the management of local affairs. At the 2023 Croatian national minorities councils and representatives elections Albanians, Germans, Hungarians, Roma, Serbs and Slovaks of Croatia each fulfilled legal requirements to elect 25 members minority councils of the Osijek-Baranja County while Bosniaks, Macedonians, Montenegrins and Slovenes of Croatia electing individual representatives. Numerous municipalities, towns or cities in the county elected their own local minority councils as well.

== Demographics ==
Osijek-Baranja County: Population trends 1857–2021
v

population	146505	166970	164425	189075	209709	231107	232713	263024	280670	294376	328965	351164	356470	367193	330506	305032	258719
	1857	1869	1880	1890	1900	1910	1921	1931	1948	1953	1961	1971	1981	1991	2001	2011	2021

Sources: Croatian Bureau of Statistics publications

Several minorities in Osijek-Baranja County have their Minority Councils. Here is the list of minorities' Councils with links to their respective Statutes and name of Osijek-Baranja County in their language.

Minority Council	Council Seat	Statute	Name of Council
Albanians	Valpovo		Kshilli i pakicës kombtare shqiptare i Prefekturës së osijekut e baranjës
Magyars	Osijek		Eszék-Baranya Megyei Magyar Kisebbségi Önkormányzat
Danube Swabians	Osijek		Rat der deutschen Minderheit der Osijeker-baranjaer Gespanschaft
Romani	Jagodnjak		
Slovaks	Jelisavac		Rada slovenskej narodnostnej menšiny Osječko-baranjskej župy
Serbs	Osijek		

Bosniaks, Montenegrins, Macedonians, Rusyns and Slovenes have one representative each.

The Serbian Joint Council of Municipalities, consisting of Erdut, Jagodnjak and Šodolovci municipalities is active within the county.

== Features ==
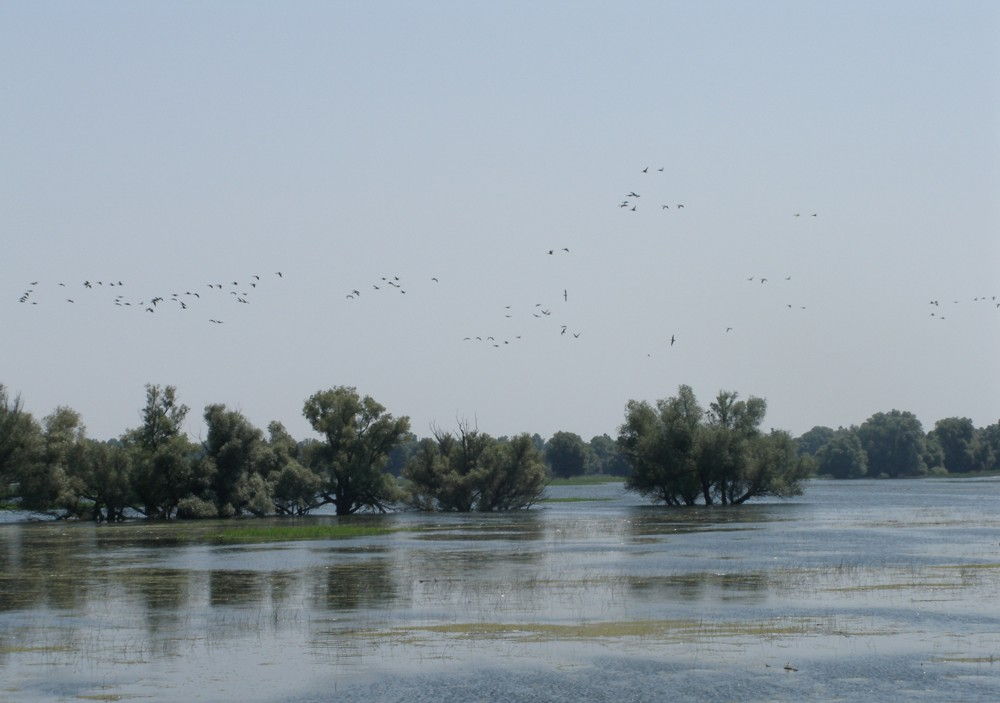
Kopački Rit

The Kopački Rit nature park is located within this county. Other notable attractions in the country include Đakovo Cathedral, Tvrđa, Bizovac spa, Đakovački vezovi, Osijek Zoo and Aquarium, Urban Fest Osijek, Red fićo in Osijek, Battle of Batina monument, Eastern Continental wine region and other.

== See also ==
- Baranya County of the Kingdom of Hungary
- Virovitica County of the Kingdom of Croatia-Slavonia
