= Branjina =

- Village (Selo)
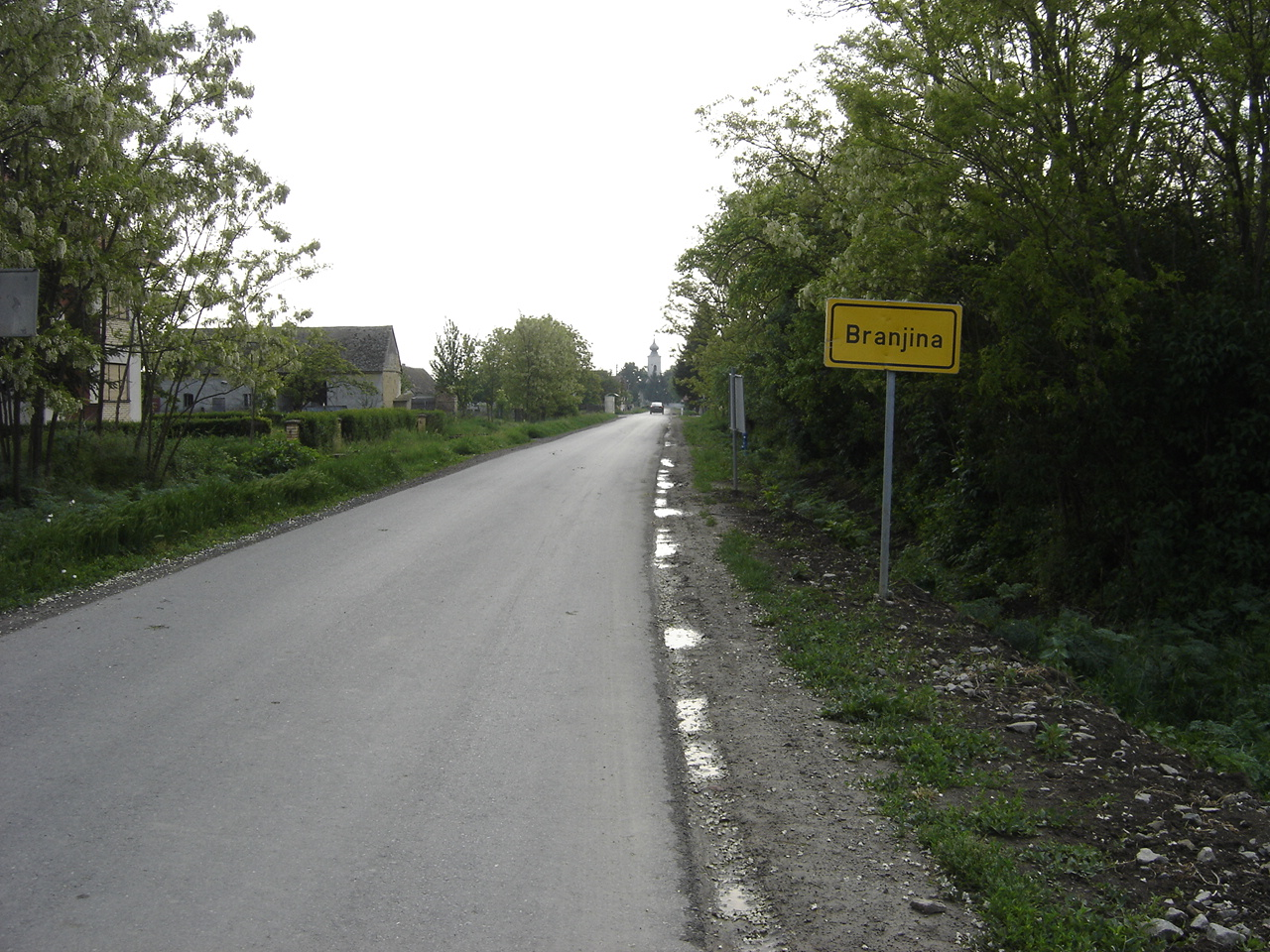
- Sign post at the entrance to the settlement of Branjina in Baranja

- Location within Osijek-Baranja County Location within Croatia Location within Europe
- Country: Croatia
- County: Osijek-Baranja
- Municipality: Popovac

Area
  - Total: 15.8 km^{2} (6.1 sq mi)

Population (2021)
  - Total: 223
  - Density: 14.1/km^{2} (36.6/sq mi)

Branjina (Hungarian: Baranyakisfalud, Serbian Cyrillic: Брањина) is a settlement in the region of Baranja, Croatia. Administratively, it is located in the Popovac municipality within the Osijek-Baranja County. Population is 322 people. Until the end of World War II, the inhabitants were Danube Swabians, also called locally as Stifolder, because their ancestors arrived in the 17th century and 18th century from Fulda (district). Most of the former German settlers was expelled to Allied-occupied Germany and Allied-occupied Austria in 1945–1948, as a result of the Potsdam Agreement.
