= Gat, Croatia =

Gat
- Village (Selo)
- Interactive map of Gat
- Location within Osijek-Baranja County Location within Croatia
- Coordinates: 45.705°N 18.325°E
- Country: Croatia
- County: Osijek-Baranja County
- Municipality: Belišće

Population (2021)
  - Total: 608

Gat is a village in Croatia, located 6 kilometres (3.7 mi) west of Belišće. The D34 state road passes by its south side, separating it from Veliškovci. In the north of the village, the Karašica is connected via a channel to the Drava river.
