= Švajcarnica =

- Village (Selo)
- Location within Osijek-Baranja County Location within Croatia Location within Europe
- Country: Croatia
- County: Osijek-Baranja
- Municipality: Darda Municipality

Area
  - Total: 1.2 km^{2} (0.46 sq mi)

Population (2021)
  - Total: 128
  - Density: 110/km^{2} (280/sq mi)

Švajcarnica (Hungarian: Őrhely, Serbian Cyrillic: Швајцарница) is a settlement in the region of Baranja, Croatia. Administratively, it is located in the Darda municipality within the Osijek-Baranja County. Population is 196 people (2011 census).

== See also ==
- Osijek-Baranja County
- Baranja
