= Donja Motičina =

- Municipality
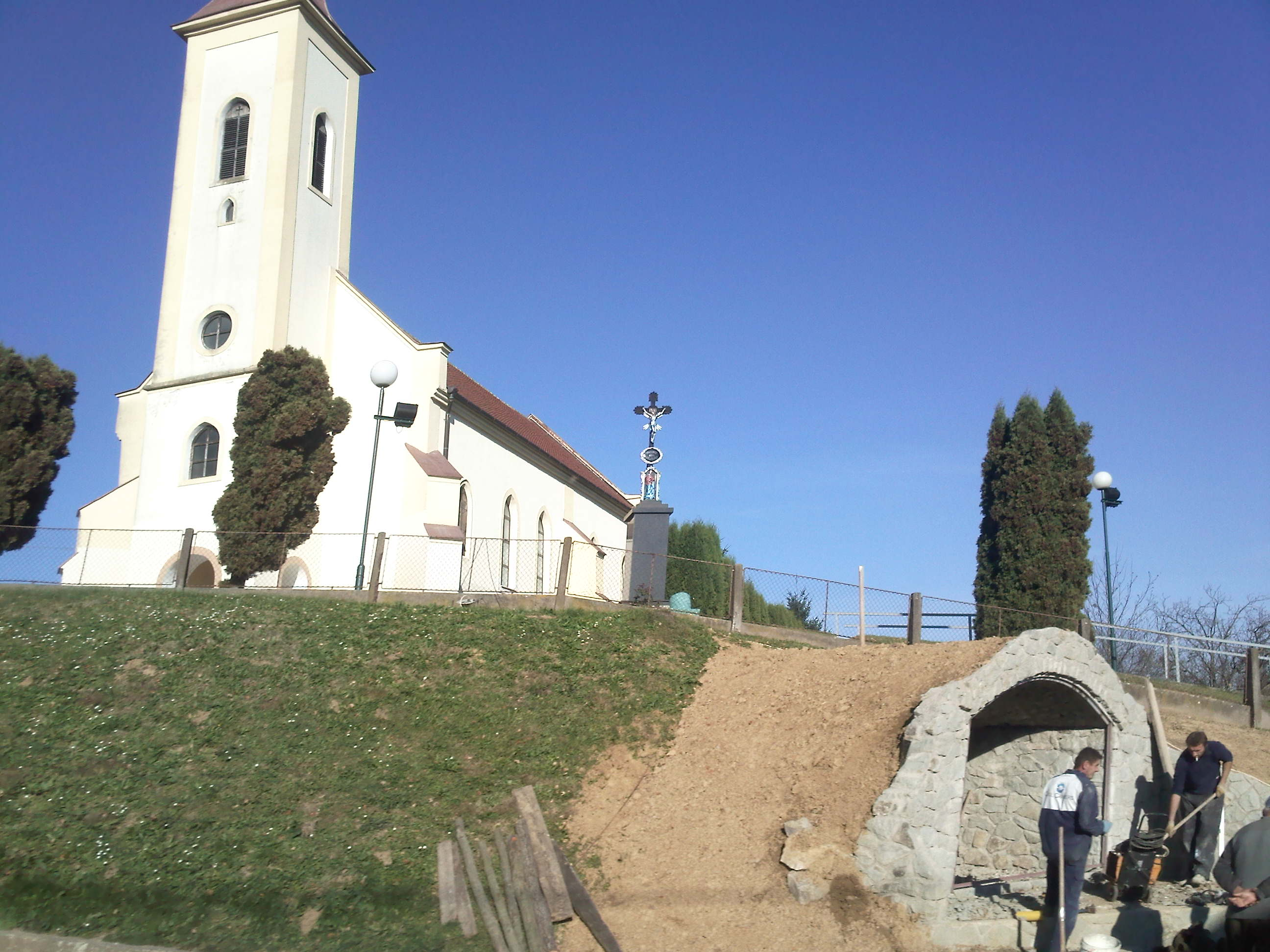

- Location of Donja Motičina in Croatia Donja Motičina (Croatia)
- Coordinates: 45.49°N 18.02°E
- Country: Croatia
- Region: Slavonia
- County: Osijek-Baranja County

Government
  - Mayor: Vinko Peršić

Area
  - Municipality: 52.0 km^{2} (20.1 sq mi)
  - Urban: 20.9 km^{2} (8.1 sq mi)

Population (2021)
  - Municipality: 1,334
  - Density: 25.7/km^{2} (66.4/sq mi)
  - Urban: 990
  - Urban density: 47/km^{2} (120/sq mi)
- Time zone: UTC+1 (Central European Time)
- Website: donja-moticina.hr

Donja Motičina (Hungarian: Alsómatucsina) is a municipality in Osijek-Baranja County, Croatia.

In the 2011 census, there were 1,652 inhabitants, in the following settlements:

- Donja Motičina, population 1,198
- Gornja Motičina, population 49
- Seona, population 405
