= Branko Mikasinovich (academic) =

Serbian slavist

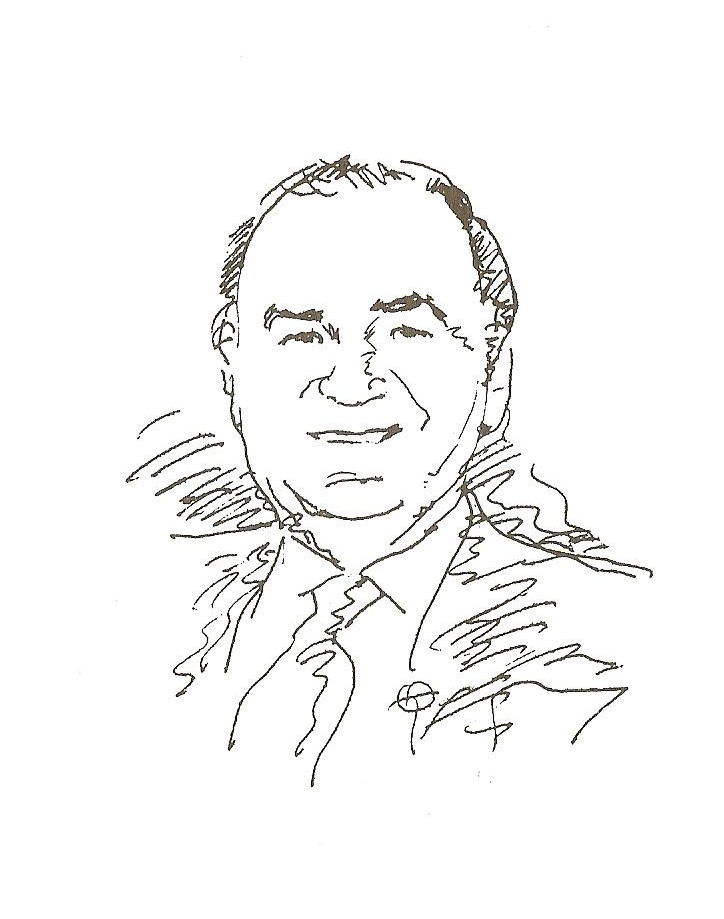
- Born: Belišće, Kingdom of Yugoslavia
- Occupation: Slavist
- Writing career
- Language: Serbian, English

Branko Mikasinovich (born November 6, 1938) is a Serbian American scholar of Yugoslav and Serbian literature, as well as a noted Slavist.

== Education and career ==
Mikasinovich was born in Belišće. He received his B.A. from Roosevelt University in Chicago in 1965, his M.A. from Northwestern University, Evanston, Illinois in 1967, and a Ph.D from the University of Belgrade in 1984. He was a professor of Russian and Slavic literature at Tulane University and the University of New Orleans, and president of the Louisiana Association of Professors of Slavic and Eastern European languages.

His television appearances include ABC's Press International in Chicago, PBS's International Dateline in New Orleans as well as Voice of America and the Serbian Service television program, Open Studio.

== Works ==
- Introduction to Yugoslav Literature (Twayne, 1973)
- Five Modern Yugoslav Plays (Cyrco Press, 1977)
- Modern Yugoslav Satire (Cross-Cultural Communications, 1979) (selected for "Best Titles of 1979" by Library Journal and included in the Pushcart Prize V: The Best of the Small Presses)
- Yugoslav Fantastic Prose (Proex, 1991)
- Yugoslavia: Crisis and Disintegration (Plyroma Publishing Co., 1994).
