= Vinogradci =

Settlement in Osijek-Baranja County, Croatia

- Settlement
- Interactive map of Vinogradci
- Location of Vinogradci in Croatia
- Coordinates: 45°39′55″N 18°21′44″E
- Country: Croatia
- County: Osijek-Baranja
- City: Belišće

Area
  - Total: 7.1 km^{2} (2.7 sq mi)

Population (2021)
  - Total: 211
  - Density: 30/km^{2} (77/sq mi)
- Time zone: UTC+1 (CET)
  - Summer (DST): UTC+2 (CEST)
- Postal code: 31551 Belišće
- Area code: +385 (0)31

Vinogradci is a settlement in the City of Belišće in Croatia. In 2021, its population was 211.

== Demographics ==
Vinogradci: Population trends 1857–2021
v

population	275	279	290	292	319	371	358	396	422	436	457	391	344	282	270	256	211
	1857	1869	1880	1890	1900	1910	1921	1931	1948	1953	1961	1971	1981	1991	2001	2011	2021

Sources: Croatian Bureau of Statistics publications
