= Gorica Valpovačka =

Settlement in Osijek-Baranja County, Croatia

- Settlement
- Interactive map of Gorica Valpovačka
- Location of Gorica Valpovačka in Croatia
- Coordinates: 45°38′50″N 18°21′00″E
- Country: Croatia
- County: Osijek-Baranja
- City: Belišće

Area
  - Total: 3.5 km^{2} (1.4 sq mi)

Population (2021)
  - Total: 144
  - Density: 41/km^{2} (110/sq mi)
- Time zone: UTC+1 (CET)
  - Summer (DST): UTC+2 (CEST)
- Postal code: 31550 Valpovo
- Area code: +385 (0)31

Gorica Valpovačka is a settlement in the City of Belišće in Croatia. In 2021, its population was 144.

== Demographics ==
Gorica Valpovačka: Population trends 1857–2021
v

population			40	61	100	41	83	176	204	216	183	168	211	205	186	165	144
	1857	1869	1880	1890	1900	1910	1921	1931	1948	1953	1961	1971	1981	1991	2001	2011	2021

Sources: Croatian Bureau of Statistics publications
