= Brezik Našički =

- Village (Selo)
- Location within Osijek-Baranja County Location within Croatia Location within Europe
- Country: Croatia
- County: Osijek-Baranja

Area
  - Total: 2.4 km^{2} (0.93 sq mi)

Population (2021)
  - Total: 336
  - Density: 140/km^{2} (360/sq mi)

Brezik Našički is a small village located 3 kilometers from Našice, Osijek-Baranja County, Croatia. As of the 2011 census, its population was 352.

== History ==
Brezik grew on the wilderness of Count Pejačević's estate, and was first mentioned in 1896. The village is named after the birch forest that once grew there. The first house in the area was the lodge of Count Pejačević. However, the first inhabitants were the family of Nikola and Matilda Baricevic, who moved there in 1918 from Jasenica with their five sons and two daughters. The first child in the village was born in their family in 1926.

Catholics and Orthodox Christians from Lika settled in Brezik. They were laborers on the estate of Count Pejačević. Many immigrants were recorded arriving from 1938 until the 1950s. New families included the Knezevic, Nekic and Vulics.

== Economy ==
In 1965, the village was electrified. The villagers built a dirt road that connected Brezik and Našice in 1972. By 2000, the village had access to additional utilities including water and gas.
