= Briješće =

Settlement in Osijek-Baranja County, Croatia

- Settlement
- Interactive map of Briješće
- Location of Briješće in Croatia
- Coordinates: 45°31′27″N 18°37′38″E
- Country: Croatia
- County: Osijek-Baranja
- City: Osijek

Area
  - Total: 3.5 km^{2} (1.4 sq mi)

Population (2021)
  - Total: 1,153
  - Density: 330/km^{2} (850/sq mi)
- Time zone: UTC+1 (CET)
  - Summer (DST): UTC+2 (CEST)
- Postal code: 31107 Osijek
- Area code: +385 (0)31

Briješće is a settlement in the City of Osijek in Croatia. In 2021, its population was 1153.

== Demographics ==
Briješće: Population trends 1857–2021
v

| population | | | 74 | 163 | 134 | 83 | 136 | 441 | 492 | 503 | 707 | 449 | 649 | 953 | 1382 | 1318 | 1153 |
| | 1857 | 1869 | 1880 | 1890 | 1900 | 1910 | 1921 | 1931 | 1948 | 1953 | 1961 | 1971 | 1981 | 1991 | 2001 | 2011 | 2021 |

Sources: Croatian Bureau of Statistics publications
