= Višnjevac, Osijek-Baranja County =

Višnjevac
- Suburb
- Location within Osijek-Baranja County Location within Croatia
- Coordinates: 45°34′08″N 18°36′50″E
- Country: Croatia
- County: Osijek-Baranja
- Municipality: Osijek

Area
  - Total: 7.5 km^{2} (2.9 sq mi)

Population (2021)
  - Total: 5,870
  - Density: 780/km^{2} (2,000/sq mi)
- Time zone: UTC+1 (CET)
  - Summer (DST): UTC+2 (CEST)

Višnjevac (Hungarian: Adolffalva) is a suburb of Osijek in Croatia. It is connected by the D2 highway. It is also connected by GPP bus line 5 and tram line 1. The population is 10 998.
