= Bocanjevci =

Settlement in Osijek-Baranja County, Croatia

- Settlement
- Interactive map of Bocanjevci
- Location of Bocanjevci in Croatia
- Coordinates: 45°38′27″N 18°20′11″E
- Country: Croatia
- County: Osijek-Baranja
- City: Belišće

Area
  - Total: 12.2 km^{2} (4.7 sq mi)

Population (2021)
  - Total: 342
  - Density: 28.0/km^{2} (72.6/sq mi)
- Time zone: UTC+1 (CET)
  - Summer (DST): UTC+2 (CEST)
- Postal code: 31550 Valpovo
- Area code: +385 (0)31

Bocanjevci is a settlement in the City of Belišće in Croatia. In 2021, its population was 342.

== Demographics ==
Bocanjevci: Population trends 1857–2021
v

population	774	787	704	708	858	790	813	962	998	968	894	715	634	564	518	457	342
	1857	1869	1880	1890	1900	1910	1921	1931	1948	1953	1961	1971	1981	1991	2001	2011	2021

Sources: Croatian Bureau of Statistics publications
