= Tiborjanci =

Settlement in Osijek-Baranja County, Croatia

- Settlement
- Interactive map of Tiborjanci
- Location of Tiborjanci in Croatia
- Coordinates: 45°40′59″N 18°20′12″E
- Country: Croatia
- County: Osijek-Baranja
- City: Belišće

Area
  - Total: 4.5 km^{2} (1.7 sq mi)

Population (2021)
  - Total: 218
  - Density: 48/km^{2} (130/sq mi)
- Time zone: UTC+1 (CET)
  - Summer (DST): UTC+2 (CEST)
- Postal code: 31551 Belišće
- Area code: +385 (0)31

Tiborjanci is a settlement in the City of Belišće in Croatia. In 2021, its population was 218.

== Demographics ==
Tiborjanci: Population trends 1857–2021
v

population	339	352	329	346	400	374	351	334	305	326	368	328	283	318	307	291	218
	1857	1869	1880	1890	1900	1910	1921	1931	1948	1953	1961	1971	1981	1991	2001	2011	2021

Sources: Croatian Bureau of Statistics publications
