= Kitišanci =

Settlement in Osijek-Baranja County, Croatia

- Settlement
- Interactive map of Kitišanci
- Location of Kitišanci in Croatia
- Coordinates: 45°40′59″N 18°22′19″E
- Country: Croatia
- County: Osijek-Baranja
- City: Belišće

Area
  - Total: 1.4 km^{2} (0.54 sq mi)

Population (2021)
  - Total: 145
  - Density: 100/km^{2} (270/sq mi)
- Time zone: UTC+1 (CET)
  - Summer (DST): UTC+2 (CEST)
- Postal code: 31551 Belišće
- Area code: +385 (0)31

Kitišanci is a settlement in the City of Belišće in Croatia. In 2021, its population was 145.

== Demographics ==
Kitišanci: Population trends 1857–2021
v

| population | | | 14 | 12 | 31 | 39 | 46 | 75 | 109 | 112 | 115 | 106 | 116 | 142 | 149 | 150 | 145 |
| | 1857 | 1869 | 1880 | 1890 | 1900 | 1910 | 1921 | 1931 | 1948 | 1953 | 1961 | 1971 | 1981 | 1991 | 2001 | 2011 | 2021 |

Sources: Croatian Bureau of Statistics publications
