= Bistrinci =

- Village (Selo)
- Location within Osijek-Baranja County Location within Croatia
- Coordinates: 45.696281°N 18.396615°E
- Country: Croatia

Area
  - Total: 8.6 km^{2} (3.3 sq mi)

Population (2021)
  - Total: 1,301
  - Density: 150/km^{2} (390/sq mi)

Bistrinci (Hungarian: Beszter) is a village in eastern Croatia located north of Belišće. The population is 1,598 (census 2011).
