= Podravlje =

Settlement in Osijek-Baranja County, Croatia

- Settlement
- Interactive map of Podravlje
- Location of Podravlje in Croatia
- Coordinates: 45°33′53″N 18°42′30″E
- Country: Croatia
- County: Osijek-Baranja
- City: Osijek

Area
  - Total: 2.7 km^{2} (1.0 sq mi)

Population (2021)
  - Total: 348
  - Density: 130/km^{2} (330/sq mi)
- Time zone: UTC+1 (CET)
  - Summer (DST): UTC+2 (CEST)
- Postal code: 31000 Osijek
- Area code: +385 (0)31

Podravlje is a settlement in the City of Osijek in Croatia. In 2021, its population was 348.

== Demographics ==
Podravlje: Population trends 1857–2021
v

population	289	435	314	367	365	375		567	410	492	715	991	670	467	358	357	348
	1857	1869	1880	1890	1900	1910	1921	1931	1948	1953	1961	1971	1981	1991	2001	2011	2021

Sources: Croatian Bureau of Statistics publications
