= Tvrđavica =

Settlement in Osijek-Baranja County, Croatia

- Settlement
- Interactive map of Tvrđavica
- Location of Tvrđavica in Croatia
- Coordinates: 45°34′16″N 18°40′59″E
- Country: Croatia
- County: Osijek-Baranja
- City: Osijek

Area
  - Total: 4.0 km^{2} (1.5 sq mi)

Population (2021)
  - Total: 563
  - Density: 140/km^{2} (360/sq mi)
- Time zone: UTC+1 (CET)
  - Summer (DST): UTC+2 (CEST)
- Postal code: 31000 Osijek
- Area code: +385 (0)31

Tvrđavica is a settlement in the City of Osijek in Croatia. In 2021, its population was 563.

== Demographics ==
Tvrđavica: Population trends 1857–2021
v

population	188	226	233	281	249	302	279	303	363	397	628	589	601	1014	750	578	563
	1857	1869	1880	1890	1900	1910	1921	1931	1948	1953	1961	1971	1981	1991	2001	2011	2021

Sources: Croatian Bureau of Statistics publications
