= Baranya (region) =

Geographical region between Danube and Drava rivers

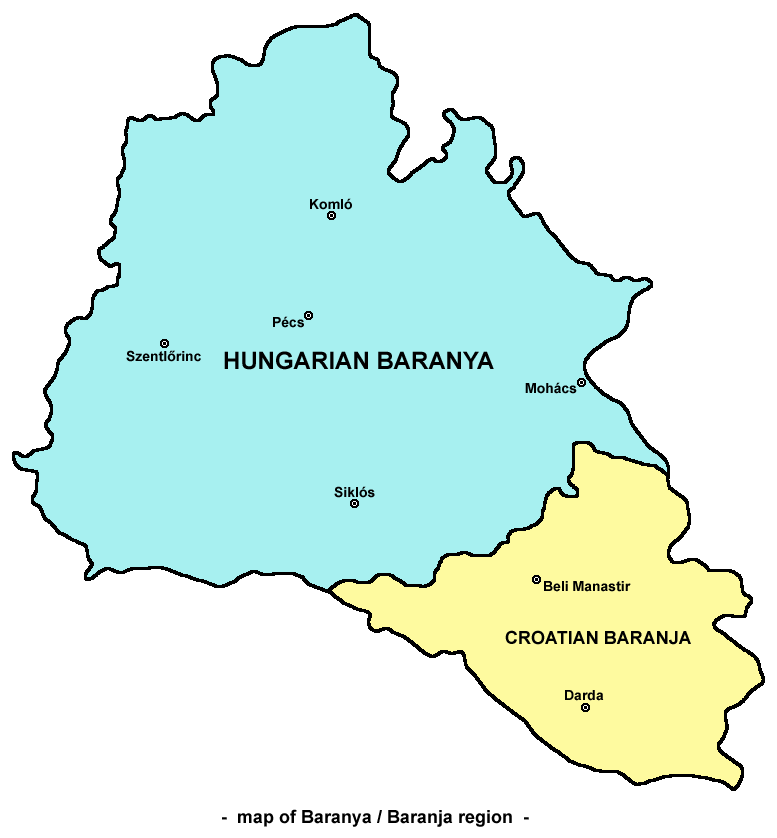
Map of the Baranya region divided between Hungary and Croatia

Baranya or Baranja (Croatian: Baranja, pronounced [bǎraɲa]; Hungarian: Baranya, pronounced [ˈbɒrɒɲɒ]) is a geographical and historical region between the Danube and the Drava rivers located in the Pannonian Plain. Its territory is divided between Hungary and Croatia. In Hungary, the region is included in Baranya county, while in Croatia, it is part of Osijek-Baranja county.

== Name ==
The name of the region come from the Slavic word 'bara', which means 'marsh', 'bog', thus the name of Baranya means 'marshland'. Even today large parts of the region are swamps, such as the natural reservation Kopački Rit in its southeast. Another theory states that the name of the region comes from the Hungarian: bárány, lit. 'lamb', an adaptation of Proto-Slavic *baranъ 'ram'.

== History ==
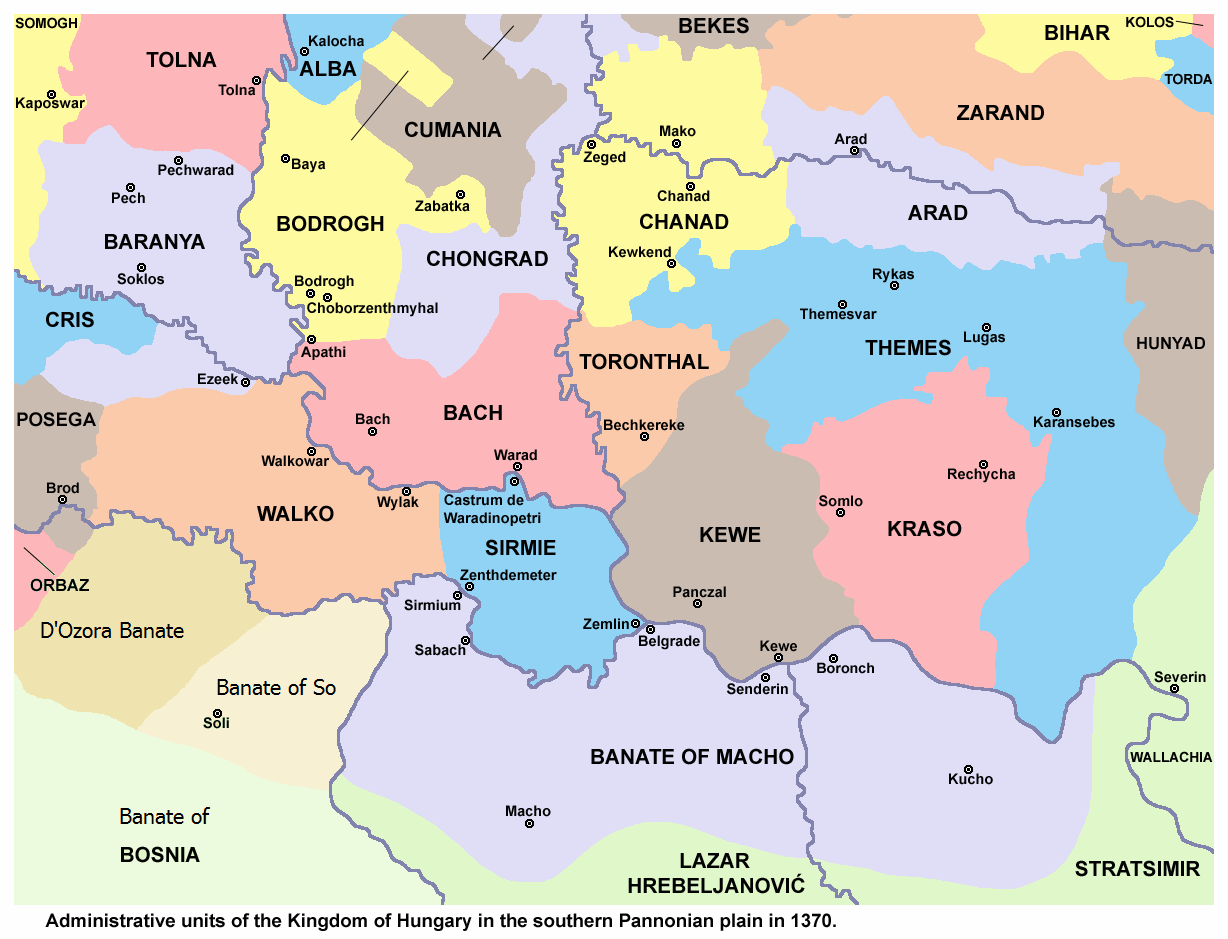
Baranya County in the 14th century

Historically, the region of Baranya was part of the Roman Empire, the Hunnic Empire, the Kingdom of the Ostrogoths, the Kingdom of the Lombards, the Avar Kingdom, the Frankish Empire, the Balaton Principality, the Bulgarian Empire, the Kingdom of Hungary, the Ottoman Empire, the Habsburg monarchy, the Austrian Empire and Austria-Hungary. For most of the 20th century, the region was divided between Hungary and Yugoslavia. Since 1991, it has been split between Croatia and Hungary.

The region of Baranya was settled by the Slavs in the 6th century, and in the 9th century, it was part of the Slavic Lower Pannonian Principality. Hungarians arrived in the area in the 9th century, and Baranya county arose as one of the first comitatus of the Kingdom of Hungary, in the 11th century. This county included not only the present-day region of Baranya, but also one part of present-day Slavonia, on the southern side of the river Drava.

In the 16th century, the Ottoman Empire captured Baranya, and included it into the sanjak of Mohács, an Ottoman administrative unit, with the seat in the town of Mohaç. Later the sanjak of Peçuy was created from the northwestern part of the Mohaç Sanjak. After Ottoman rule was established the area was settled by people from Bosnia. In the late the 17th century Baranya was captured by the Habsburg monarchy and Baranya County was restored within the Habsburg Kingdom of Hungary. Under the Habsburgs the area was settled by Germans; the total number of German settlers who emigrated from different parts of Germany to Hungary between 1686 and 1829 is estimated at 150,000. The official name Danube Swabians has been used for this population group since 1922. Croats moved from Bosnia into Slavonia and Baranja en masse after the Ottoman retreat, and this population is today known as the Šokci.

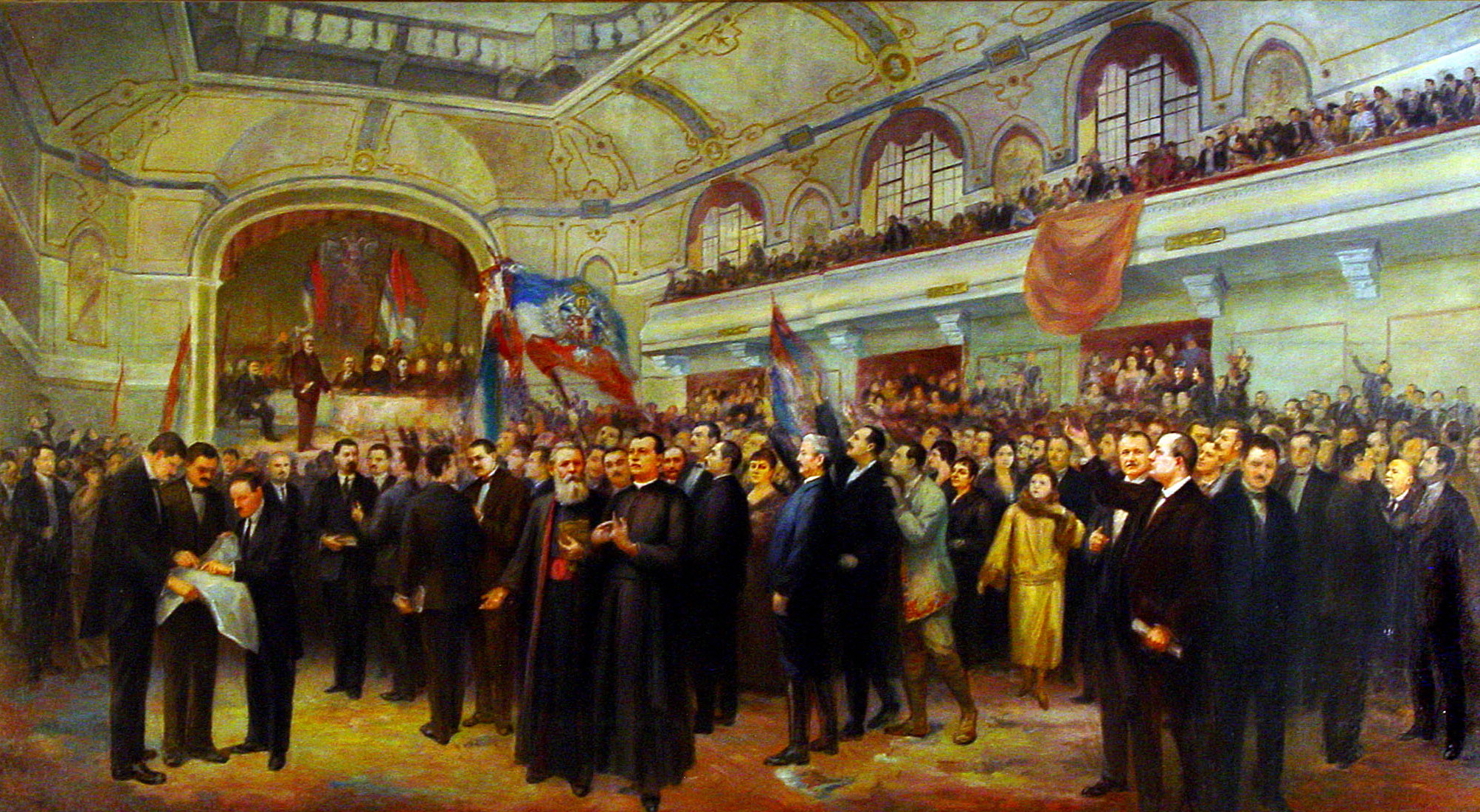
Great People's Assembly of Serbs, Bunjevci and other Slavs in Banat, Bačka and Baranja, held in Novi Sad on 25 November 1918. The assembly proclaimed joining of Banat, Bačka and Baranja regions to the Kingdom of Serbia.

In 1918, the entire region was captured by Serbian troops. The Great People's Assembly of Serbs, Bunjevci and other Slavs in Banat, Bačka and Baranja was an assembly held in Novi Sad on 25 November 1918, which proclaimed the unification of Banat, Bačka and Baranya with the Kingdom of Serbia. It would subsequently be administered by the newly created Kingdom of Serbs, Croats and Slovenes (later known as Yugoslavia). For a short time (in 1918–1919), Baranya was part of Banat, Bačka and Baranja region, which was governed by the People's Administration from Novi Sad. By the Treaty of Trianon (part of the Versailles peace) in 1920, the Baranya region was formally divided between Hungary and the Yugoslavia, but de facto remained under the administration of the latter until 1921. On 14 August 1921, the Serb-Hungarian Baranya-Baja Republic was proclaimed. It included northern parts of Baranya and Bačka regions, which were assigned to Hungary by the treaty. On 21–25 August 1921, the Republic was abolished and its territory was included into Hungary, as was previously decided by the Treaty of Trianon. The northern part of Baranya in Hungary became the Hungarian Baranya county.

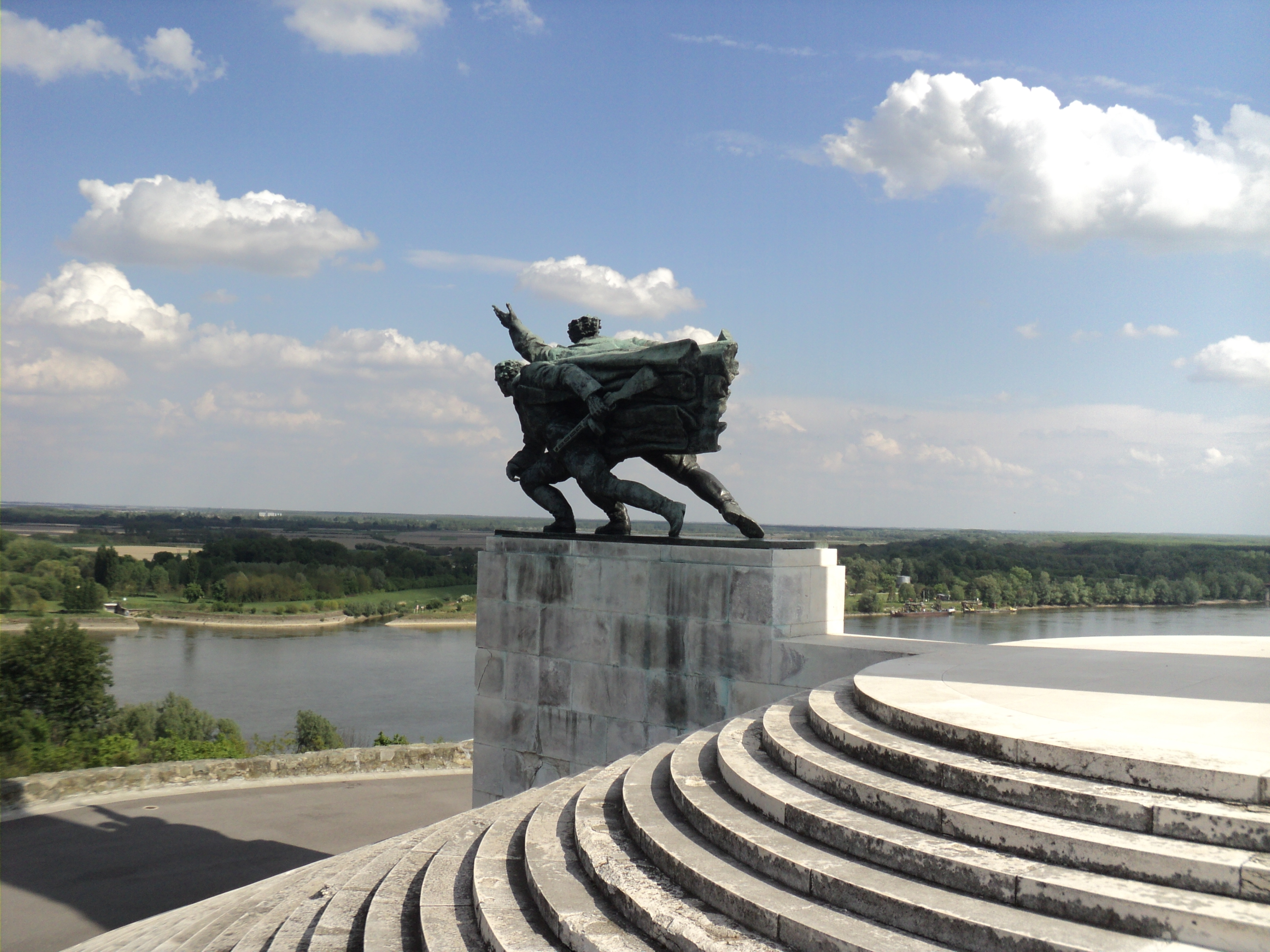
Monument to the Battle of Batina (1944)

The southern (Yugoslav) part of the region was part of Novi Sad county between 1918 and 1922, part of Bačka Oblast between 1922 and 1929, and in 1929 it was included into the Danube Banovina, a province of the Kingdom of Yugoslavia. In 1941, the Yugoslav Baranya was occupied by Hungary, but it was returned to Yugoslavia in 1944. In 1944–1945, Yugoslav Baranya was part of the Autonomous Province of Vojvodina, while in 1945 it was assigned to the People's Republic of Croatia.

During the Croatian War of Independence in 1991 it came under the control of the self-proclaimed SAO Eastern Slavonia, Baranja and Western Srem, which became part of the unrecognized self-declared Republic of Serbian Krajina. After the war ended (in 1995), it was peacefully integrated into Croatia in 1998, by the Erdut Agreement. According to the agreement, it was administered by the administration of the United Nations from 1996 to 1998, when it was returned to full sovereignty of Croatia. Today, it is part of that republic's Osijek-Baranja County.

== Stifolder ==
The Stifolder or Stiffoller Shvove are a Roman Catholic subgroup of the so called Danube Swabians. Their ancestors once came ca. 1717 - 1804 from the Hochstift Fulda and surroundings, (Roman Catholic Diocese of Fulda), and settled in the Baranya. They retained their own German dialect and culture, until the end of WW2. After WW2 the majority of Danube Swabians were expelled to allied-occupied Germany and allied-occupied Austria as a result of the Potsdam Agreement. Only a few people can speak the old Stiffolerisch Schvovish dialect. Also, a salami is named after these people.

== Geography ==
Baranya is divided between Hungary and Croatia with the majority of the region lying in Hungary. The Hungarian portion of the region coextensive with Baranya County, while in Croatia, it comprises only part of Osijek-Baranja County. Contemporary Hungarian usage of Baranya usually refers only to the Hungarian section while the terms Drávaköz and Drávaszög ("Drava corner") are used for Croatian Baranja.

=== Hungarian Baranya ===
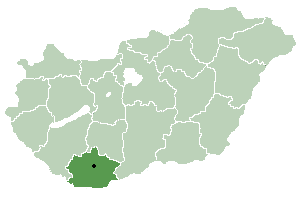
Baranya County within Hungary

Some of the important cities and towns in Hungarian Baranya (with population figures from 2001 census):

- Pécs (158,942)
- Komló (27,462)
- Mohács (19,085)
- Szigetvár (11,492)
- Siklós (10,384)
- Szentlőrinc (7,265)
- Pécsvárad (4,104)
- Bóly (3,715)
- Sásd (3,570)
- Harkány (3,519)
- Sellye (3,248)
- Villány (2,793)

=== Croatian Baranja ===
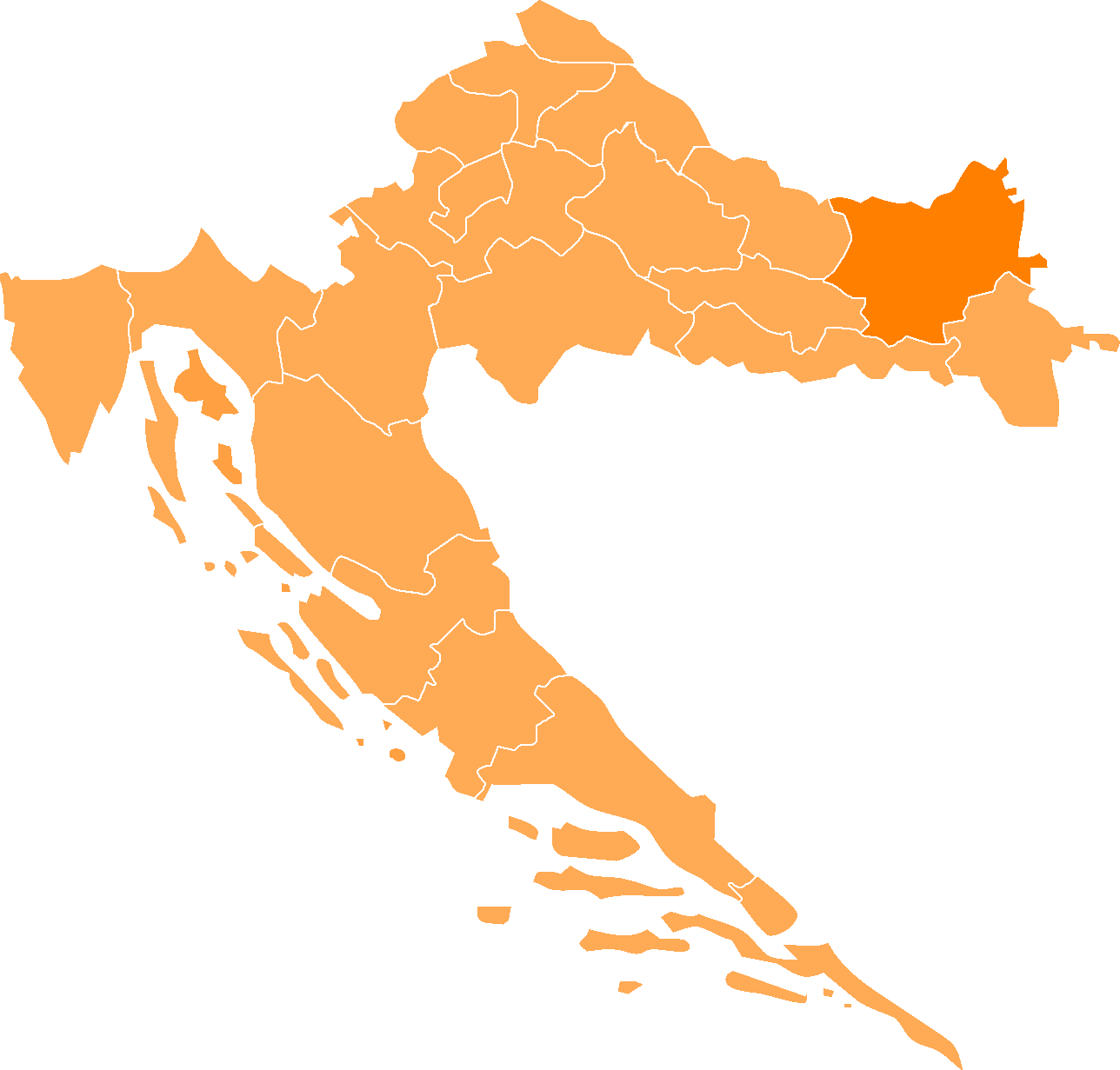
Osijek-Baranja County within Croatia

Municipalities in Croatian Baranja (with population figures from 2001 census):

- Beli Manastir (10,986)
- Darda (7,062)
- Bilje (5,480)
- Kneževi Vinogradi (5,186)
- Draž (3,356)
- Čeminac (2,856)
- Petlovac (2,743)
- Jagodnjak (2,537)
- Popovac (2,427)
- Suburban settlements of Tvrđavica and Podravlje of the city of Osijek

The main settlement in Croatian Baranja is Beli Manastir with a population of 8,671 (2001 census). Most of the municipalities in Croatian Baranja have a Croat ethnic majority with a small Danube Swabians minority. The municipality of Jagodnjak has a Serb ethnic majority and the municipality of Kneževi Vinogradi has a Hungarian plurality.

== Demographics ==
=== Hungarian Baranya ===
In 2001, the population of Hungarian Baranya (Baranya county) numbered 407,448 inhabitants, including:

- Hungarians = 375,611 (92.19%)
- Germans = 22,720 (5.58%)
- Romani = 10,623 (2.61%)
- Croats = 7,294 (1.79%)

=== Croatian Baranja ===
In 2011, the population of Croatian Baranja numbered 39,420 inhabitants, including:

- Croats = 23,041 (58.45%)
- Serbs = 7,278 (18.46%)
- Hungarians = 5,980 (15.17%)
- Germans = 3,121 (7.92%)

== Gallery ==
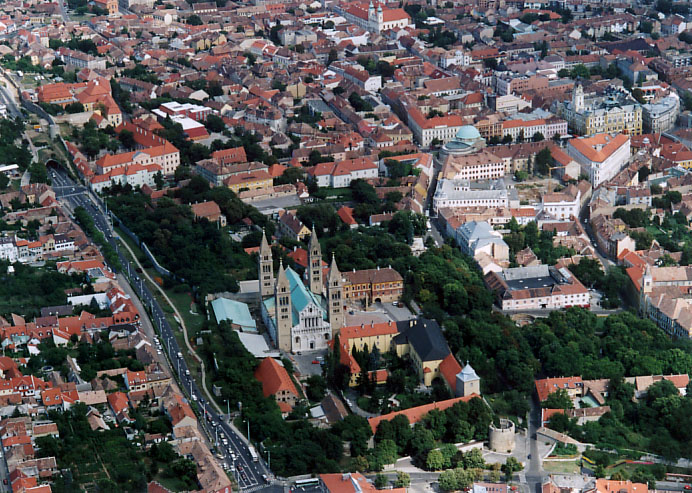
Aerial photography: Pécs, Hungary

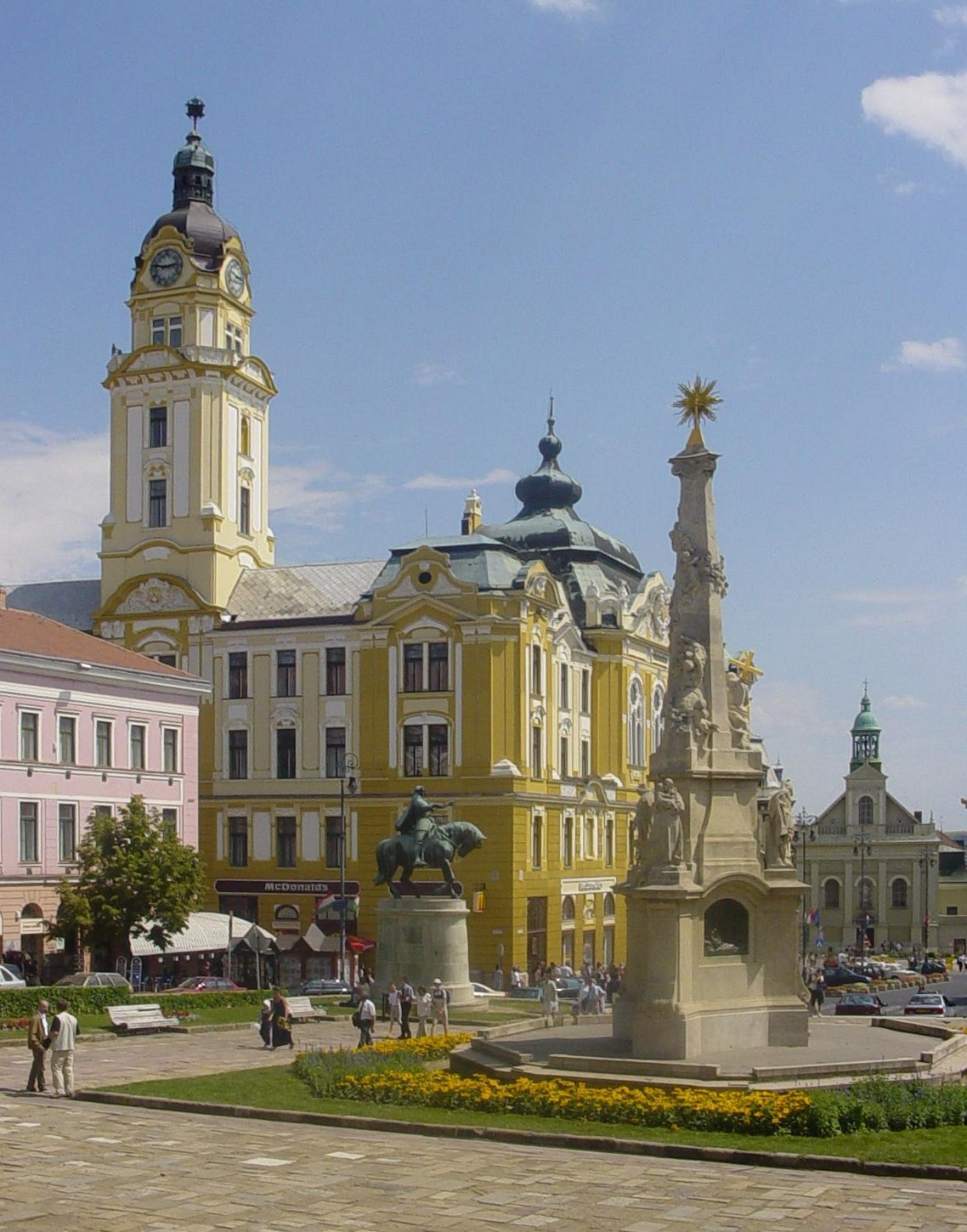
Pécs, Hungary, Main Square

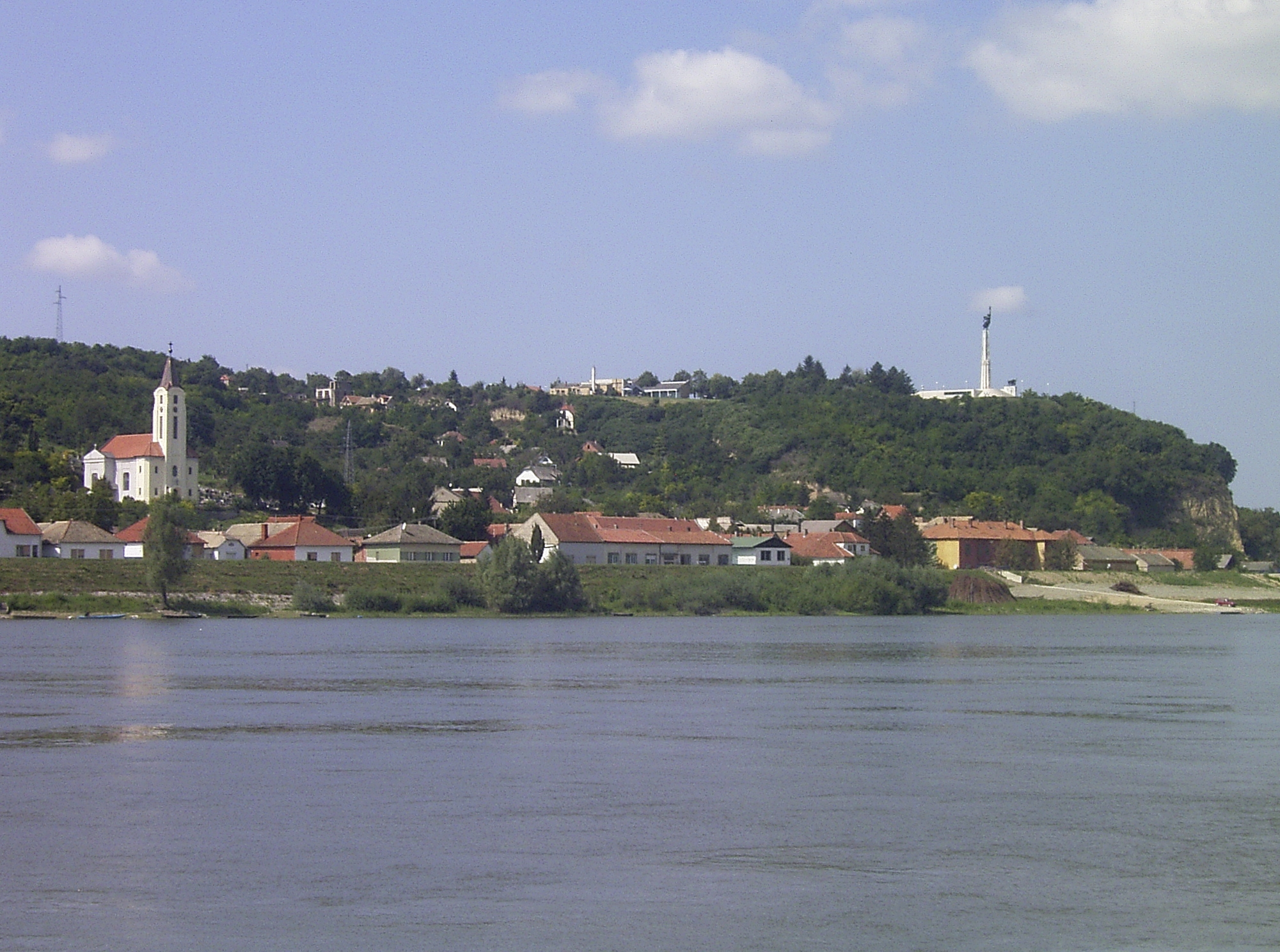
2004 waterfront of Batina, Croatia

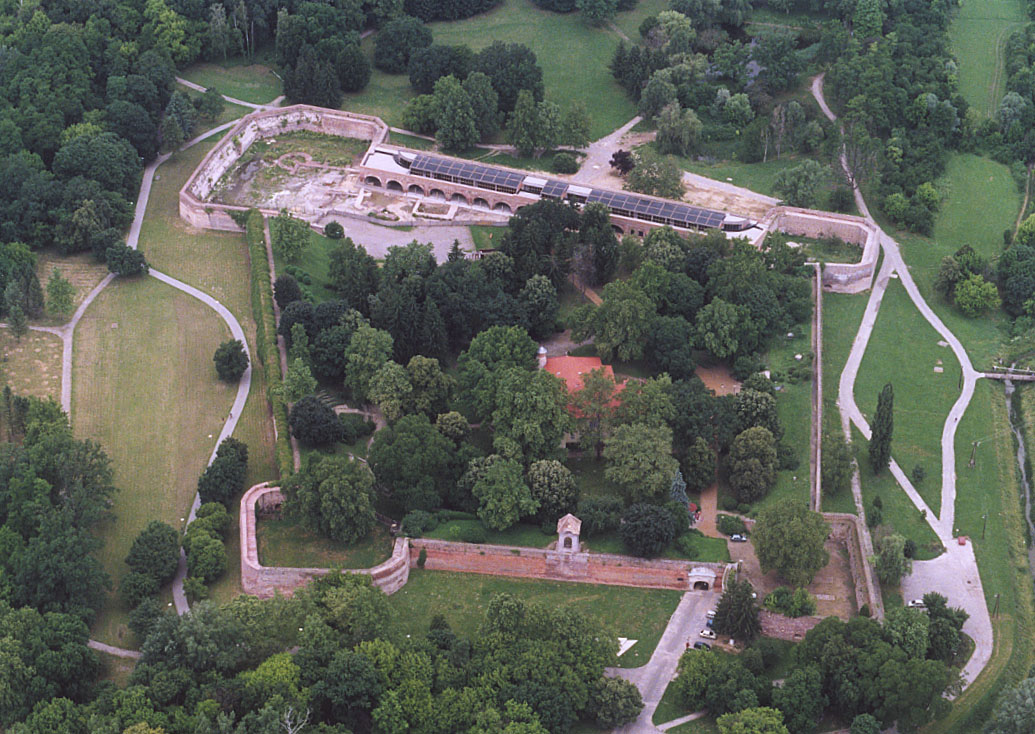
Aerial Photography: Szigetvár, Hungary - Castle

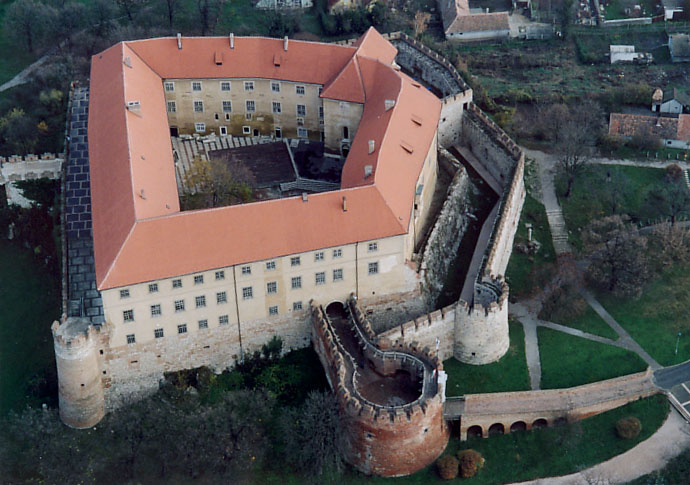
Castle of Siklós, Hungary

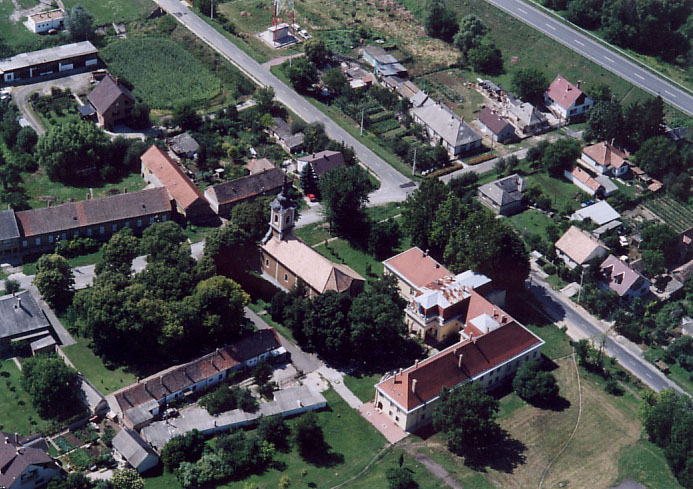
Szentlőrinc, Hungary - Palace from above

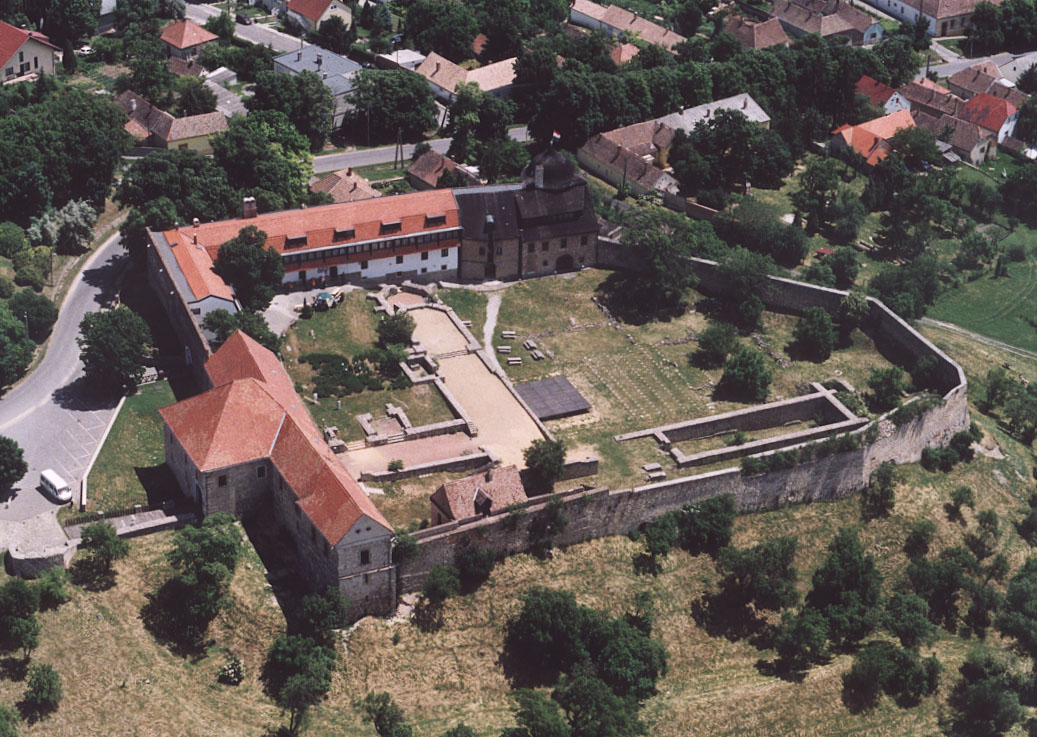
Aerial photography: Castle of Pécsvárad, Hungary

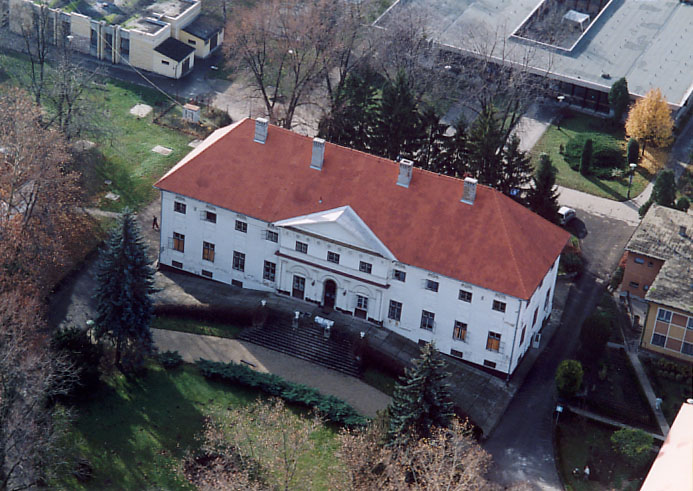
Aerial photography: Bóly, Hungary - Palace

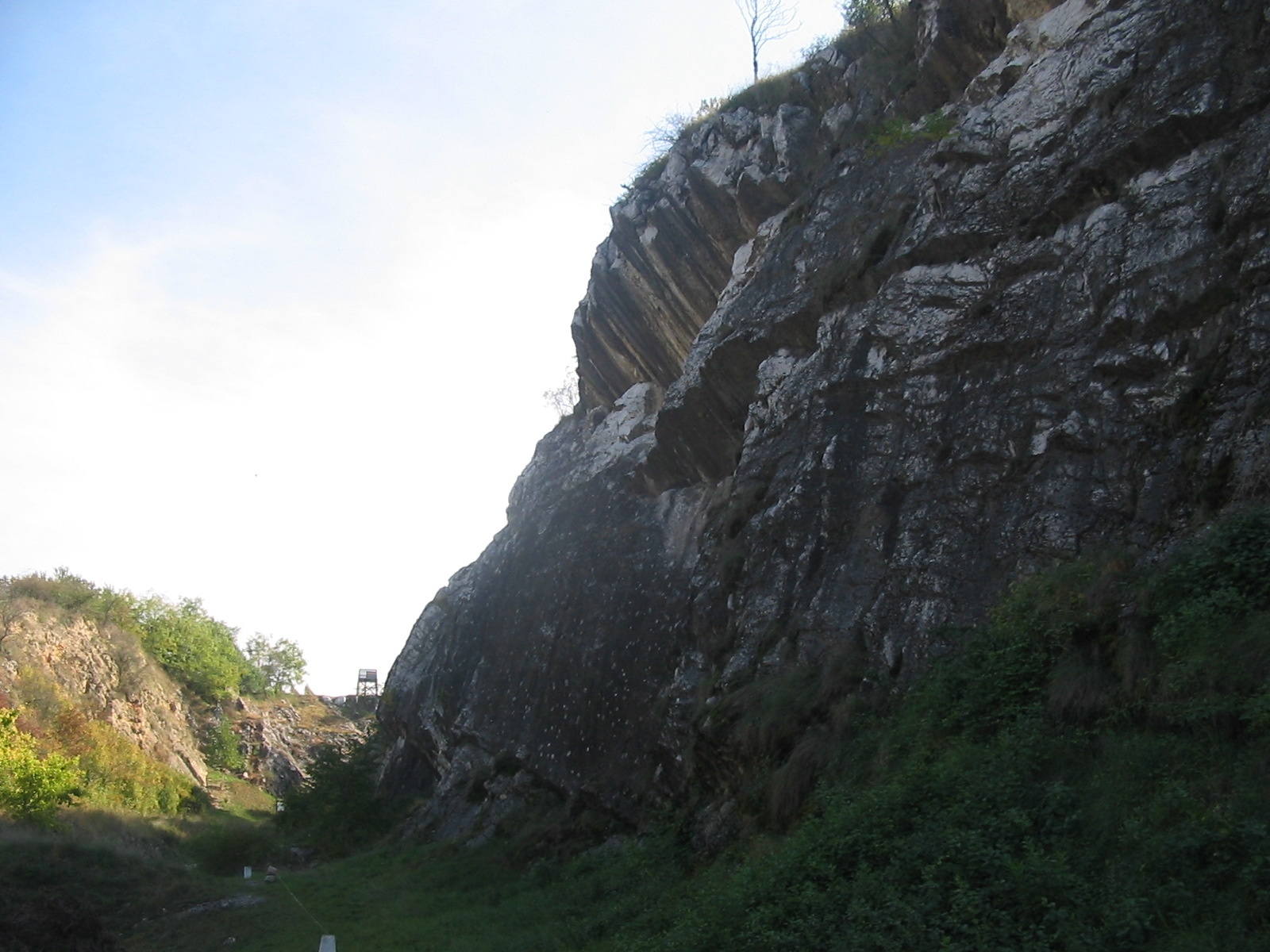
A scene in Villány Mountains, Hungary

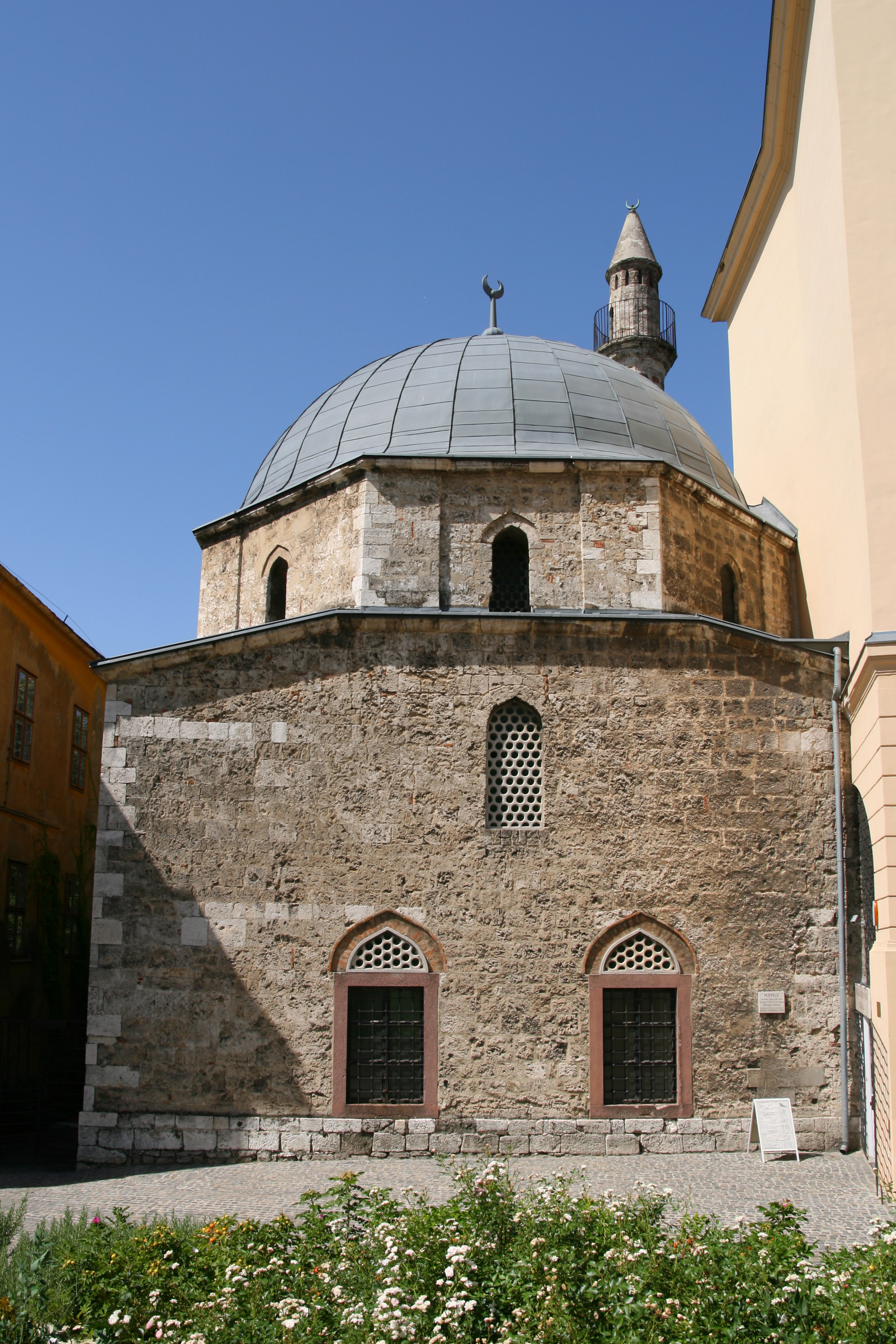
Turkish Monument of Pécs, Hungary (Jakovali Hassan mosque)

== See also ==
- Baranya-Baja Republic
- Baranya County
- Baranya County (former)
- List of places in Croatian Baranja
- Osijek-Baranja County
- Srem-Baranja Oblast

== Sources and references ==
- WorldStatesmen - Hungary
