= Veliškovci =

- Village (Selo)
- Location within Osijek-Baranja County Location within Croatia
- Country: Croatia

Area
  - Total: 10.5 km^{2} (4.1 sq mi)

Population (2021)
  - Total: 561
  - Density: 53.4/km^{2} (138/sq mi)
- Time zone: UTC+1 (CET)
  - Summer (DST): UTC+2 (CEST)

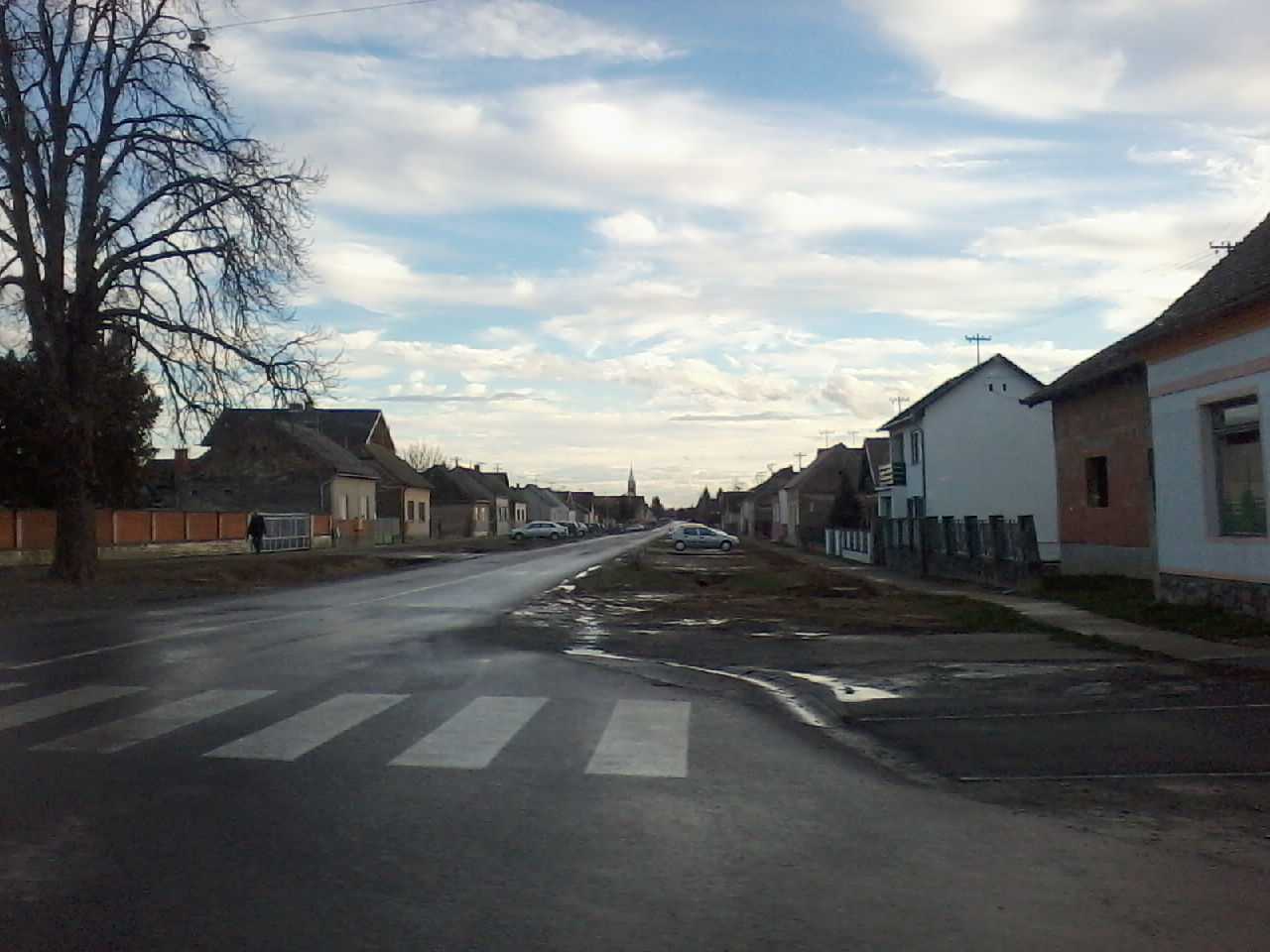

Veliškovci (Hungarian: Veliskovce German: Welischkow) is a village in Croatia. It is connected by the D34 highway.
