= D515 road =

Road in Croatia

D515 state road

Route information
- Length: 31.4 km (19.5 mi)

Major junctions
- From: D2 in Našice
- To: D7 near Đakovo

Location
- Country: Croatia
- Counties: Osijek-Baranja
- Major cities: Našice, Đakovo

Highway system
- Highways in Croatia

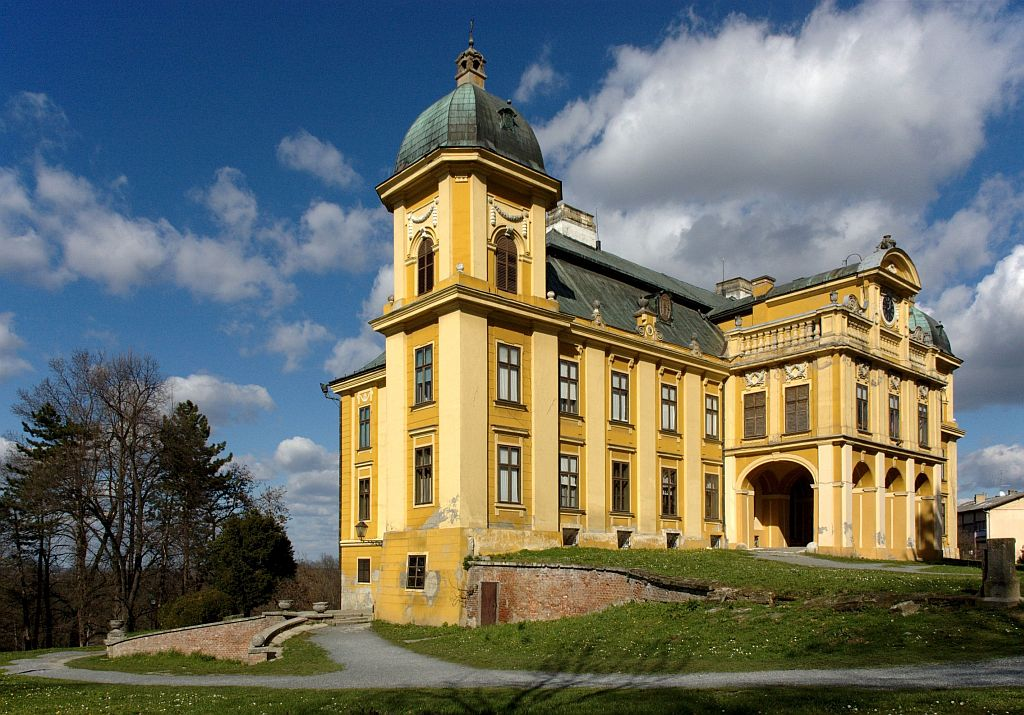
Našice, at the northern terminus of the D515 road

D515 is a state road in Slavonia region of Croatia connecting Našice and Đakovo, i.e. the D2 and D7 state roads. The road is 31.4 km (19.5 mi) long.

The road, as well as all other state roads in Croatia, is managed and maintained by Hrvatske ceste, state owned company.

== Traffic volume ==
Traffic is regularly counted and reported by Hrvatske ceste, operator of the road.

D515 traffic volume
Road	Counting site	AADT	ASDT	Notes
D515	3602 Podgorač	1,528	2,101	Adjacent to the Ž4105 junction.

== Road junctions and populated areas ==
D515 junctions/populated areas
Type	Slip roads/Notes
	Našice; D2 to Slatina (D34, D69) and Virovitica (D5) (to the west) and to Koška (D517) and Osijek (to the east). The northern terminus of the road.
	Markovac Našički; Ž4168 to Našice and Martin (D53).
	Vukojevci
	Stipanovci
	Podgorač; Ž4105 to Budimci and Čepin.
	Razbojište
	Bračevci
	Potnjani
	Ž4118 to Drenje.
	Satnica Đakovačka; Ž4128 to Gorjani. Ž4129 to Kondrić.
	D7 to the A5 motorway Đakovo interchange and Velika Kopanica (to the south) and to Osijek (D2) (to the north). Ž4147 to Đakovo. The southern terminus of the road.
