= Vehicle registration plates of Croatia =

Republic of Croatia
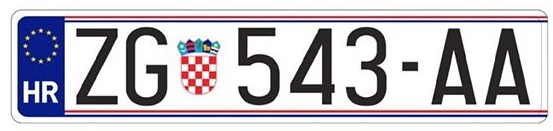
- Licence plate format issued since 2016 (ZG = Zagreb)
- Country: Croatia
- Country code: HR

Current series
- Size: 520 mm × 110 mm 20.5 in × 4.3 in
- Serial format: AB 123-CD (AB being the regional code)
- Colour (front): Black on white
- Colour (rear): Black on white

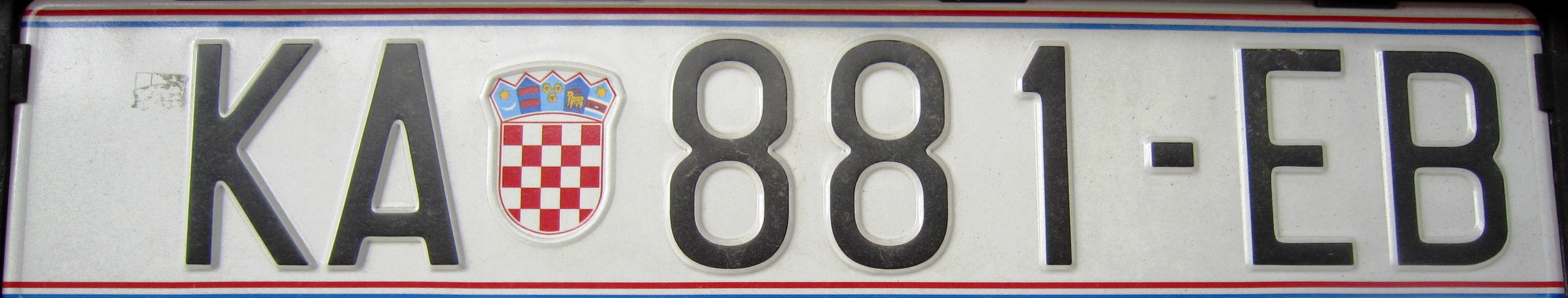
The pre-2016 Croatian licence plate format (KA = Karlovac)

The standard licence plates in Croatia consist of a two-letter city code which is separated by the coat of arms of Croatia from three or four numbers and one or two letters.

== Regular plates ==
The standard regular plate consists of three or four randomly assigned numbers, one or two randomly assigned letters, and the first two letters indicate the city, separated by the Croatian coat of arms, while the numbers and the last letters are separated by a dash (example; ZG 000-A, ZG 000-AA, ZG 0000-A or ZG 0000-AA). The letters Q, W, X and Y are not used in Croatian plates because they are not in Croatian alphabet. Since Croatia entered the European Union in 2013, there have been proposals to permanently change the design scheme (consisting of new letter font and ideas to replace the coat of arms with four red squares). However, in July 2016, it was determined to keep the original design and add the blue EU-issued sticker, applying the standard with EU member states and Vienna Convention. The design of Croatian license plates comes from old Yugoslav license plates from the 1980s, and it remained the same (with a notable difference of switching the red star, Yugoslav national symbol, with the coat of arms).

== Customized plates ==
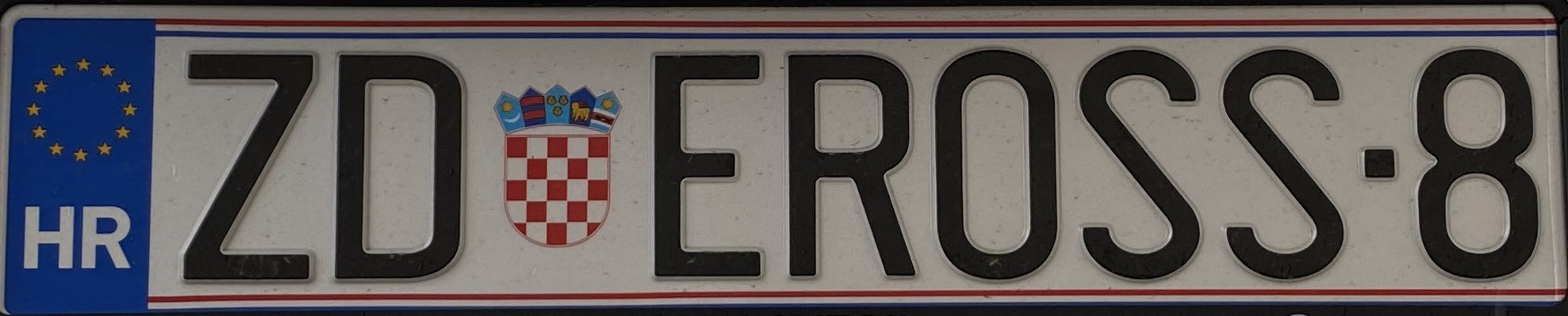
Customized registration plate

There is also a possibility of having a customized plate for a fee. One type of customized plate looks exactly like the standard ones, with the exception that the combination of numbers and letters is personally chosen by the vehicle's owner. The other kind of customized plates can consist of a word with from four to seven letters or a combination of the word with four or five letters and one or two numbers. However, these plates are still quite rare in Croatia, mostly because they can only be used for five years after the first registration and they also require a fee of 270 euros

== Special plates ==
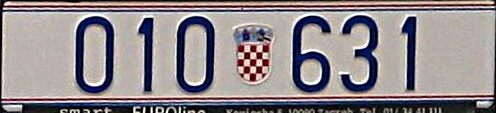
Blue-on-white police registration plate

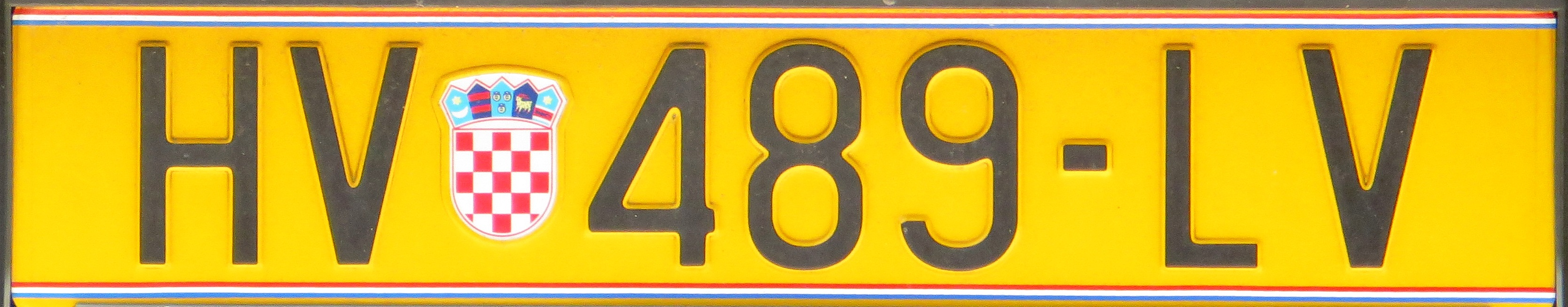
An example of a military plate

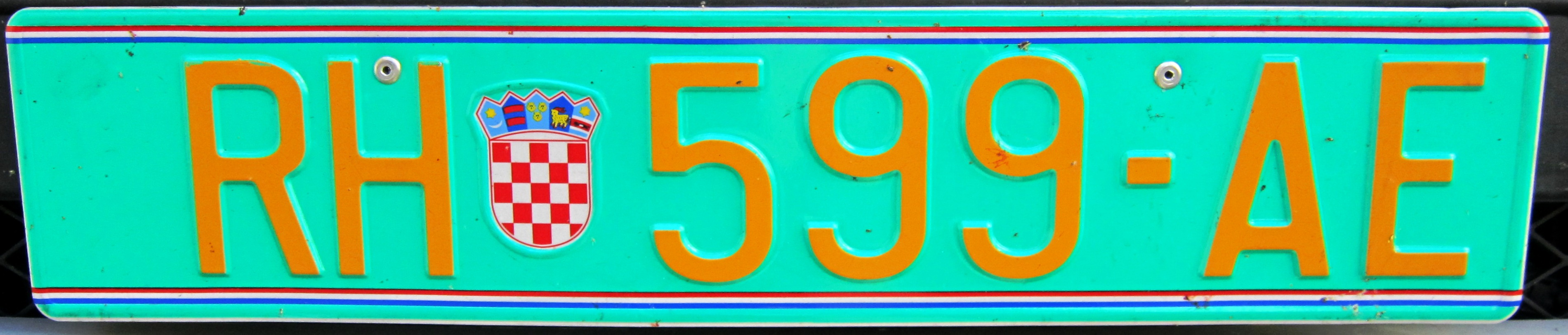
An export plate

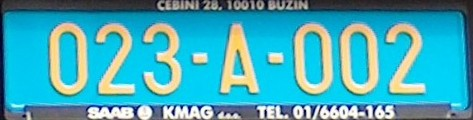
Diplomatic Corps plate

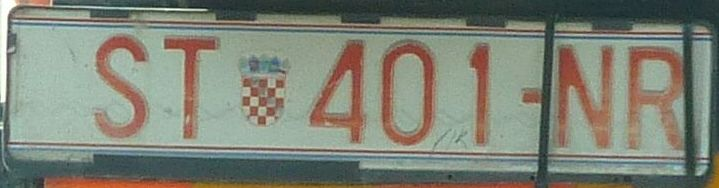
A plate for oversized vehicles

There are also some special plates. While the numbers and letters on standard licence plates are colored black, plates for foreign citizens permanently living in Croatia, international organizations and temporary registered vehicles have green numbers and letters. On the plates used on bigger trucks and other vehicles that can be oversized for some of the smaller roads, the numbers and letters are red.

The police vehicles are equipped with the plates consisting of six numbers divided in two groups and separated by the coat of arms of Croatia, blue numbers. The first group of numbers denote the police department to which the vehicle belongs. While the background on all of these plates is colored white, on those used on military vehicles it is yellow. However, the system of dividing numbers and letters is the same as on the standard plates, but instead of a city code there are letters HV for Hrvatska vojska (Croatian military). At the same time, specialized military vehicles have the letters VP for vojna policija or MP for military police (military police) as the final two letters. Plates for diplomatic representatives (embassies, consulates) are blue with yellow numbers and letters. The first three number denote the country, followed by letter A, C, or M, then serial number of the vehicle.

As opposed to all above mentioned plates that are made of metal, the dealer's test plates are stickers that are attached to the plate holder. These plates consist of a city code separated by the coat of arms from five numbers divided in two groups and they can be used for a limited number of days.

Starting from 2008 onwards, special plates with an additional two letters (PP or PV) were introduced, PP stands for prijenosne pločice (transferable plates) and PV stands for povijesno vozilo (historical vehicle) in a form CC-PV-NNN(N).

Also from 2008 onwards, export plates are introduced, with RH standing for Republika Hrvatska, and a green background with yellow numbers and letters. Croatia's Ministry of Internal Affairs proposed new licence plates with the EU stars.

== City codes ==
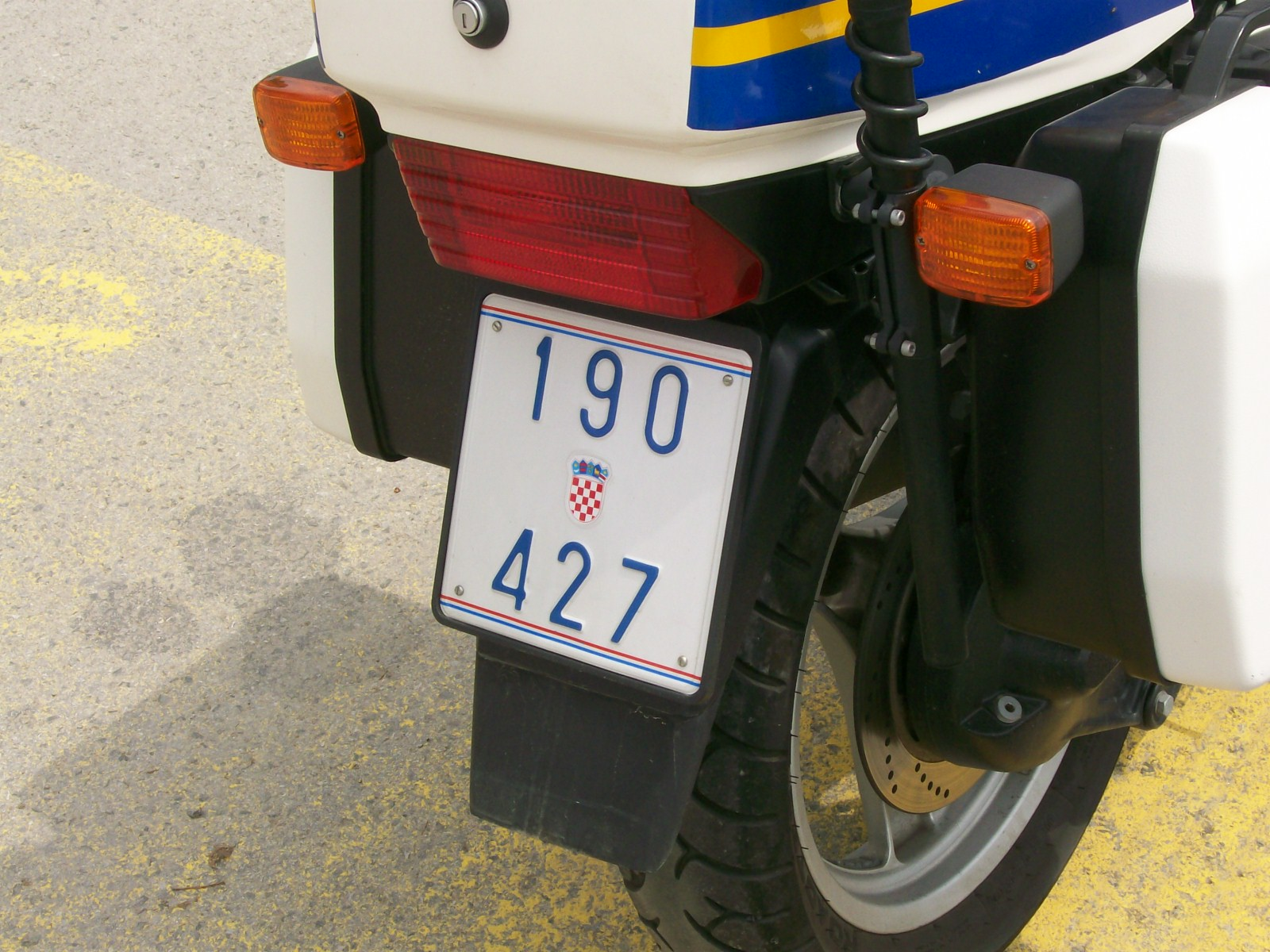
licence plate on a Croatian Police motorcycle

Code	Cities/Towns	Municipalities
BJ	Bjelovar, Čazma, Garešnica	Berek, Hercegovac, Ivanska, Kapela, Nova Rača, Rovišće, Severin, Šandrovac, Štefanje, Velika Pisanica, Veliko Trojstvo, Velika Trnovitica, Zrinski Topolovac
BM	Beli Manastir	Bilje, Čeminac, Darda, Draž, Jagodnjak, Kneževi Vinogradi, Petlovac, Popovac
ČK	Čakovec, Mursko Središće, Prelog	Belica, Dekanovec, Domašinec, Donja Dubrava, Donji Kraljevec, Donji Vidovec, Goričan, Gornji Mihaljevec, Kotoriba, Mala Subotica, Nedelišće, Orehovica, Podturen, Pribislavec, Selnica, Strahoninec, Sveta Marija, Sveti Juraj na Bregu, Sveti Martin na Muri, Šenkovec, Štrigova, Vratišinec
DA	Daruvar, Grubišno Polje, Lipik, Pakrac	Dežanovac, Đulovac, Končanica, Sirač, Veliki Grđevac
DE	Čabar, Delnice	Brod Moravice, Fužine, Lokve, Mrkopalj, Ravna Gora, Skrad
DJ	Đakovo	Drenje, Gorjani, Levanjska Varoš, Punitovci, Satnica Đakovačka, Semeljci, Strizivojna, Trnava, Viškovci
DU	Dubrovnik, Korčula, Metković, Opuzen, Ploče	Blato, Dubrovačko Primorje, Janjina, Konavle, Kula Norinska, Lastovo, Lumbarda, Mljet, Orebić, Pojezerje, Slivno, Smokvica, Ston, Trpanj, Vela Luka, Zažablje, Župa Dubrovačka
GS	Gospić, Novalja, Otočac, Senj	Brinje, Donji Lapac, Karlobag, Lovinac, Perušić, Plitvička Jezera, Udbina, Vrhovine
IM	Imotski	Cista Provo, Lokvičići, Lovreć, Podbablje, Proložac, Runovići, Zagvozd, Zmijavci
KA	Duga Resa, Karlovac, Slunj, Ozalj	Barilovići, Bosiljevo, Cetingrad, Draganić, Generalski Stol, Krnjak, Lasinja, Netretić, Rakovica, Ribnik, Vojnić, Žakanje
KC	Đurđevac, Koprivnica	Drnje, Đelekovec, Ferdinandovac, Gola, Hlebine, Kalinovac, Kloštar Podravski, Koprivnički Bregi, Koprivnički Ivanec, Legrad, Molve, Novigrad Podravski, Novo Virje, Peteranec, Podravske Sesvete, Rasinja, Sokolovac, Virje
KR	Donja Stubica, Klanjec, Krapina, Oroslavje, Pregrada, Zabok, Zlatar	Bedekovčina, Budinščina, Desinić, Đurmanec, Gornja Stubica, Hrašćina, Hum na Sutli, Jesenje, Konjščina, Kraljevec na Sutli, Krapinske Toplice, Kumrovec, Lobor, Mače, Marija Bistrica, Mihovljan, Novi Golubovec, Petrovsko, Radoboj, Stubičke Toplice, Sveti Križ Začretje, Tuhelj, Veliko Trgovišće, Zagorska Sela, Zlatar-Bistrica
KT	Kutina, Novska, Popovača	Jasenovac, Lipovljani, Velika Ludina
KŽ	Križevci	Gornja Rijeka, Kalnik, Sveti Ivan Žabno, Sveti Petar Orehovec
MA	Makarska, Vrgorac	Baška Voda, Brela, Gradac, Podgora, Tučepi
NA	Donji Miholjac, Našice	Donja Motičina, Đurđenovac, Feričanci, Koška, Magadenovac, Marijanci, Podravska Moslavina, Podgorač, Viljevo
NG	Nova Gradiška	Cernik, Davor, Dragalić, Gornji Bogićevci, Nova Kapela, Okučani, Rešetari, Stara Gradiška, Staro Petrovo Selo, Vrbje
OG	Ogulin	Josipdol, Plaški, Saborsko, Tounj
OS	Belišće, Osijek, Valpovo	Antunovac, Bizovac, Čepin, Erdut, Ernestinovo, Petrijevci, Šodolovci, Vladislavci, Vuka
PU	Buje, Buzet, Labin, Novigrad, Pazin, Poreč, Pula, Rovinj, Umag, Vodnjan	Bale, Barban, Brtonigla, Cerovlje, Fažana, Gračišće, Grožnjan, Kanfanar, Karojba, Kaštelir-Labinci, Kršan, Lanišće, Ližnjan, Lupoglav, Marčana, Medulin, Motovun, Oprtalj, Pićan, Raša, Sveta Nedelja, Sveti Lovreč, Sveti Petar u Šumi, Svetvinčenat, Tinjan, Višnjan, Vižinada, Vrsar, Žminj
PŽ	Kutjevo, Pleternica, Požega	Brestovac, Čaglin, Jakšić, Kaptol, Velika
RI	Bakar, Cres, Crikvenica, Kastav, Kraljevica, Krk, Mali Lošinj, Novi Vinodolski, Opatija, Rab, Rijeka, Vrbovsko	Baška, Čavle, Dobrinj, Jelenje, Klana, Kostrena, Lovran, Malinska-Dubašnica, Matulji, Mošćenička Draga, Omišalj, Punat, Vinodol, Viškovo, Vrbnik
SB	Slavonski Brod	Bebrina, Brodski Stupnik, Bukovlje, Donji Andrijevci, Garčin, Gornja Vrba, Gundinci, Klakar, Oprisavci, Oriovac, Podcrkavlje, Sibinj, Sikirevci, Slavonski Šamac, Velika Kopanica, Vrpolje
SK	Glina, Hrvatska Kostajnica, Sisak, Petrinja	Donji Kukuruzari, Dvor, Gvozd, Hrvatska Dubica, Lekenik, Majur, Martinska Ves, Sunja, Topusko
SL	Orahovica, Slatina	Crnac, Čačinci, Čađavica, Mikleuš, Nova Bukovica, Sopje, Voćin, Zdenci
ST	Hvar, Kaštela, Komiža, Omiš, Sinj, Solin, Split, Stari Grad, Supetar, Trilj, Trogir, Vis, Vrlika	Bol, Dicmo, Dugi Rat, Dugopolje, Hrvace, Jelsa, Klis, Lećevica, Marina, Milna, Muć, Nerežišća, Okrug, Otok, Podstrana, Postira, Prgomet, Primorski Dolac, Pučišća, Seget, Selca, Sućuraj, Sutivan, Šestanovac, Šolta, Zadvarje
ŠI	Drniš, Knin, Skradin, Šibenik, Vodice	Bilice, Biskupija, Civljane, Ervenik, Kijevo, Kistanje, Murter-Kornati, Promina, Pirovac, Primošten, Rogoznica, Ružić, Tisno, Unešić
VK	Otok, Vinkovci	Andrijaševci, Ivankovo, Jarmina, Markušica, Nijemci, Nuštar, Privlaka, Stari Jankovci, Stari Mikanovci, Tordinci, Vođinci, Karadžićevo
VT	Virovitica	Gradina, Lukač, Pitomača, Suhopolje, Špišić Bukovica
VU	Ilok, Vukovar	Bogdanovci, Borovo, Lovas, Negoslavci, Tompojevci, Tovarnik, Trpinja
VŽ	Ivanec, Lepoglava, Ludbreg, Novi Marof, Varaždin, Varaždinske Toplice	Bednja, Breznica, Breznički Hum, Beretinec, Cestica, Donja Voća, Martijanec, Gornji Kneginec, Jalžabet, Klenovnik, Ljubešćica, Mali Bukovec, Maruševec, Petrijanec, Sračinec, Sveti Đurđ, Sveti Ilija, Trnovec Bartolovečki, Veliki Bukovec, Vidovec, Vinica, Visoko
ZD	Benkovac, Biograd na Moru, Nin, Obrovac, Pag, Zadar	Bibinje, Galovac, Gračac, Jasenice, Kali, Kukljica, Lišane Ostrovičke, Novigrad, Pakoštane, Pašman, Polača, Poličnik, Posedarje, Povljana, Preko, Privlaka, Ražanac, Sali, Stankovci, Starigrad, Sukošan, Sveti Filip i Jakov, Škabrnja, Tkon, Vir, Zemunik Donji
ZG	Dugo Selo, Ivanić-Grad, Jastrebarsko, Samobor, Sveta Nedelja, Sveti Ivan Zelina, Velika Gorica, Vrbovec, Zagreb, Zaprešić	Bedenica, Bistra, Brckovljani, Brdovec, Dubrava, Dubravica, Farkaševac, Gradec, Jakovlje, Klinča Sela, Krašić, Kloštar Ivanić, Kravarsko, Križ, Luka, Marija Gorica, Orle, Pisarovina, Pokupsko, Preseka, Pušća, Rakovec, Rugvica, Stupnik, Žumberak
ŽU	Županja	Babina Greda, Bošnjaci, Cerna, Drenovci, Gradište, Gunja, Štitar, Vrbanja

=== Obsolete codes ===
Code	Place	Reason
KN	Krapina	Previously used on Yugoslav plates, but never on plates in independent Croatia, lest the code would be mistaken for Knin, capital of, at the time extant, separatist Republic of Serbian Krajina. Krapina was assigned the new code KR, previously (and currently) used for Kranj, Slovenia.
PS	Slatina	The town changed its name back from Podravska Slatina to Slatina in 1992. These plates were phased out in 2005. Slatina was assigned the new code SL.
SI	Sisak	Previously used on Yugoslav plates, but never on plates in independent Croatia, lest the code would be mistaken for Šibenik ŠI. Sisak was assigned the new code SK, previously (and currently) used for Skopje, North Macedonia.
SP	Požega	Previously used on Yugoslav plates, but never on plates in independent Croatia since the city changed its name back from Slavonska Požega to Požega in 1991. Požega was assigned the new code PŽ.
TK	Korenica	Previously used on Yugoslav plates, but never on plates in independent Croatia since the village changed its name back from Titova Korenica to Korenica in 1996. Korenica was assigned Gospić GS code.

== Partial index of diplomatic, consular and foreign mission prefixes ==
Code	Country or Organization
010	Holy See
011	Germany
012	Austria
013	Italy
014	Hungary
015	Sweden
016	Slovenia
017	Poland
018	France
019	Sudan
020	United Kingdom
021	Switzerland
022	China
023	Norway
024	United States
025	Bulgaria
026	Iran
027	Russia
028	Czech Republic
029	Slovakia
030	Bosnia and Herzegovina
031	Turkey
032	Romania
033	UNICEF
034	WHO
035	WFP
036	UNHCR
039	Spain
040	Malta
041	Belgium
042	Denmark
043	Canada
047	Albania
048	Netherlands
049	Serbia
050	North Macedonia
051	Malaysia
052	Pakistan
053	Greece
054	Ukraine
055	Chile
056	IMF (International Monetary Fund)
057	India
058	UNDP (United Nations Development Programme)
059	European Union
060	EBRD
061	ICRC
062	IOM
063	OSCE (Organization for Security and Co-operation in Europe)
064	South Korea
065	UN-NGLS
066	Finland
067	Egypt
068	UNESCO
069	World Bank
070	Japan
071	Israel
072	Guinea-Bissau
073	Portugal
074	Australia
077	RACVIAC (Centre for Security Cooperation)
078	Libya
079	Denmark
081	International Sava River Basin Commission
082	Brazil
083	United Nations
084	Montenegro
085	Algeria
086	Kazakhstan
087	Kosovo
088	Azerbaijan
089	Indonesia
090	Morocco
091	Qatar
092	Lithuania
093	European Commission
094	Ireland
095	Iraq

== Sources ==
- "Pravilnik o registraciji i označavanju vozila" (in Croatian). Ministry of the Interior (Croatia). 2017.
