= Ivanovci =

Ivanovci may refer to several places:

- In Croatia
  - Ivanovci, Osijek-Baranja County, a village near Valpovo
  - Ivanovci, Požega-Slavonia County, a village near Čaglin
  - Ivanovci Đakovački, formerly, Ivanovci Gorjanski, a village near Đakovo
  - Marjanski Ivanovci, a village near Marijanci
- In Slovenia
  - Ivanovci, Moravske Toplice
- in Serbia
  - Ivanovci (Ljig)
