= Vehicle registration plates of Yugoslavia =

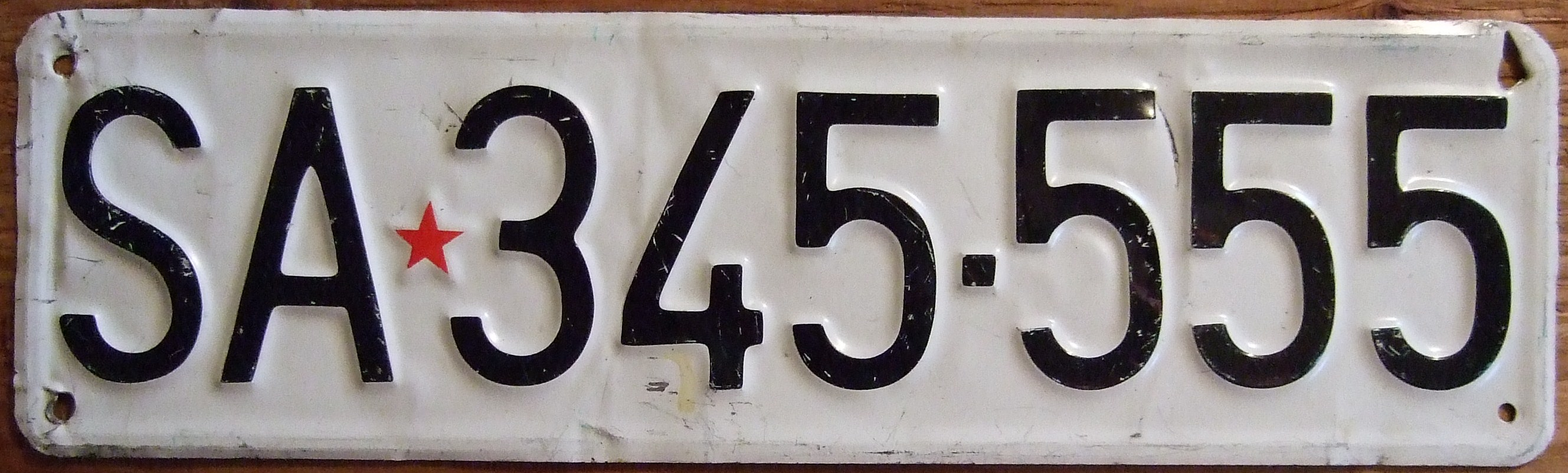
A SFR Yugoslav plate from Sarajevo

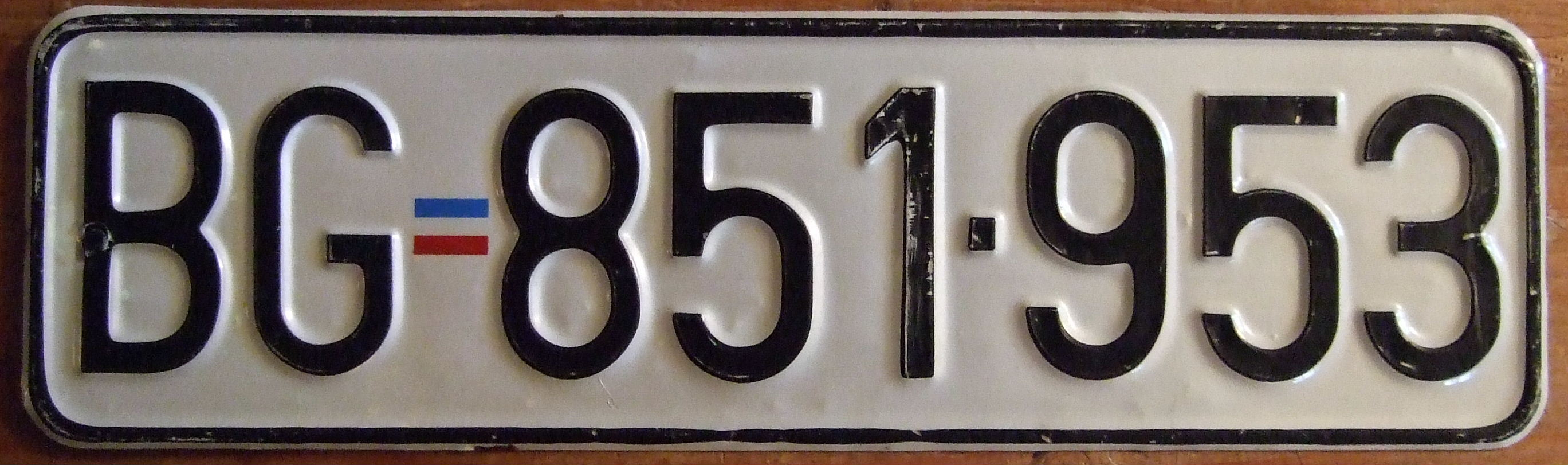
A FR Yugoslav plate from Belgrade. The five-pointed star was replaced by the tricolor. This style license plate was used until 2011.

Car number plates in SFR Yugoslavia consisted of a two-letter district code that showed the place where the car carrying them was registered, followed by a red star and two groups of digits that could contain two or three characters, for example: BG 12-34, BG 123-45 or BG 123-456. The letter codes matched the municipalities of Yugoslavia:

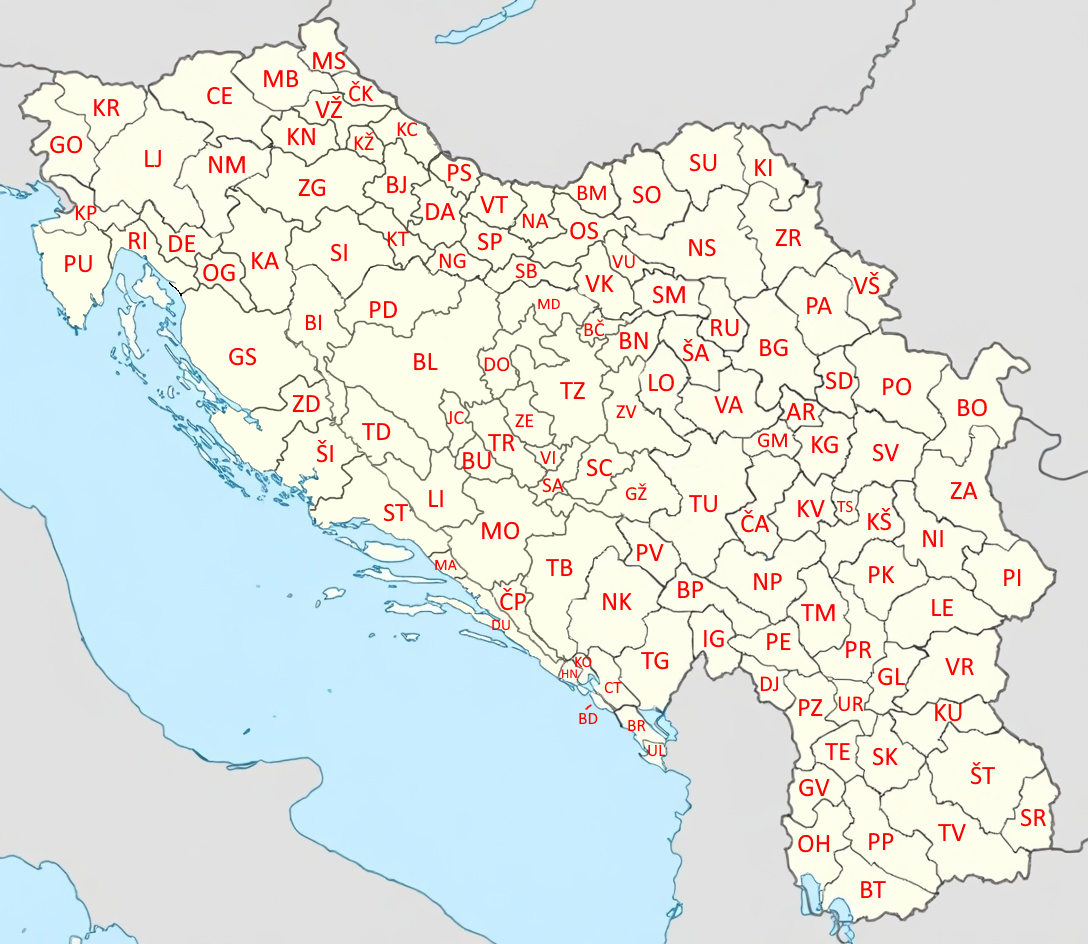
Geographic distribution of city codes in Yugoslav license plates

Code	Region	Renamed	Code	Region	Renamed
AR	Aranđelovac		NM	Novo Mesto	
BL	Banja Luka		OG	Ogulin	
BR	Bar		OH	Ohrid	
BM	Beli Manastir		OS	Osijek	
BG	Beograd		PA	Pančevo	
BI	Bihać		PE	Peć	
BN	Bijeljina		PI	Pirot	
BT	Bitola		PV	Pljevlja	
BJ	Bjelovar		PO	Požarevac	
BO	Bor		PB	Priboj	
BČ	Brčko		PP	Prilep	
BD	Budva		PD	Prijedor	
BU	Bugojno		PR	Priština	
CE	Celje		PS	Podravska Slatina	from 1992 Slatina
CT	Cetinje		PZ	Prizren	
ČA	Čačak		PK	Prokuplje	
ČK	Čakovec		PU	Pula	
ČP	Čapljina		RI	Rijeka	
DA	Daruvar		RU	Ruma	
DE	Delnice		SA	Sarajevo	
DO	Doboj		SI	Sisak	
DU	Dubrovnik		SK	Skopje	
DJ	Djakovica		SB	Slavonski Brod	
DJK	Djakovo		SP	Slavonska Požega	from 1991 Požega
GL	Gnjilane		SD	Smederevo	
GM	Gornji Milanovac		SC	Sokolac	
GŽ	Goražde		SO	Sombor	
GO	Nova Gorica		ST	Split	
GS	Gospić		SM	Sremska Mitrovica	
GV	Gostivar		SR	Strumica	
HN	Herceg Novi		SU	Subotica	
IG	Ivangrad	from 1992 Berane	SV	Svetozarevo	from 1992 Jagodina
JC	Jajce		ŠA	Šabac	
KA	Karlovac		ŠI	Šibenik	
KI	Kikinda		ŠT	Štip	
KNJ	Konjic		TE	Tetovo	
KP	Koper		TG	Titograd	from 1992 Podgorica
KC	Koprivnica		TD	Titov Drvar	from 1992 Drvar
KO	Kotor		TK	Titova Korenica	from 1991 Korenica
KG	Kragujevac		TM	Titova Mitrovica	from 1989 Kosovska Mitrovica
KV	Kraljevo		TV	Titov Veles	from 1992 Veles
KR	Kranj		TU	Titovo Užice	from 1992 Užice
KN	Krapina		TR	Travnik	
KŽ	Križevci		TB	Trebinje	
KŠ	Kruševac		TS	Trstenik	
KU	Kumanovo		TZ	Tuzla	
KT	Kutina		UL	Ulcinj	
LE	Leskovac		UR	Uroševac	
LI	Livno		VA	Valjevo	
LO	Loznica		VŽ	Varaždin	
LJ	Ljubljana		VK	Vinkovci	
MA	Makarska		VT	Virovitica	
MB	Maribor		VI	Visoko	
MD	Modriča		VR	Vranje	
MO	Mostar		VŠ	Vršac	
MS	Murska Sobota		VU	Vukovar	
NA	Našice		ZD	Zadar	
NK	Nikšić		ZG	Zagreb	
NI	Niš		ZA	Zaječar	
NG	Nova Gradiška		ZR	Zrenjanin	
NP	Novi Pazar		ZE	Zenica	
NS	Novi Sad		ZV	Zvornik	

== Special plates ==
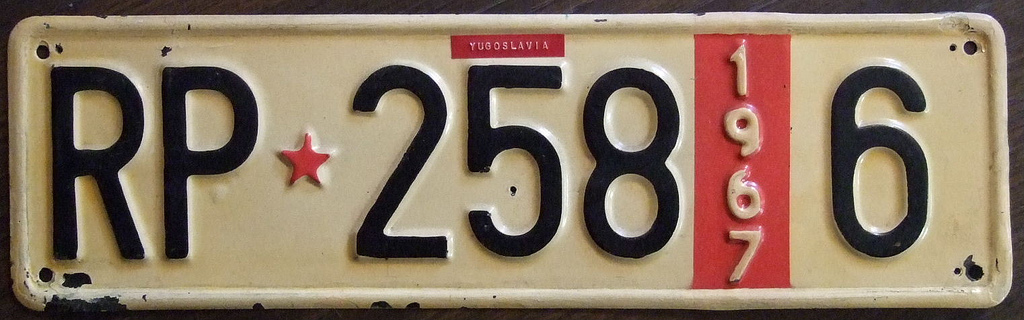
A temporary plate

- Trailer plates had the reverse format of the normal plates, starting with the digits and ending with the regional code.
- Diplomatic plates had yellow letters on black background. The vehicles were marked with an oval sticker with a mark CMD, CD or CC.
- Plates of vehicles and trailers belonging to the Yugoslav armed forces had the red star separated on the left side, together with a red JNA inscription.
- Temporary plates had RP (registrovano privremeno) on the place of the district code, followed by three or four digits, a vertical red band containing the year of registration and a numerical denotation of the republic where the vehicle was temporarily registered.
- Police plates had white letters on blue background and started with M (milicija).
- Agricultural plates had white letters on green background.
- Vehicles with exceptional dimensions received red plates with white letters.

== Successor state plates ==
- Vehicle registration plates of Bosnia and Herzegovina
- Vehicle registration plates of Croatia
- Vehicle registration plates of Kosovo
- Vehicle registration plates of Montenegro
- Vehicle registration plates of North Macedonia
- Vehicle registration plates of Serbia
- Vehicle registration plates of Slovenia
