= 1996 Croatian local advisory referendums =

Local advisory referendums were held in Croatia on 2 June 1996, following proposed changes to the system of local and regional self-government. The referendums covered seven municipalities, 3 cities and one county.

== Voting system ==
At the referendum, voters had to vote for the suggestion of regional affiliation. In order for the referendum to be valid, it is necessary for the turnout to be higher than 50%.

== Questions ==
=== Island of Pag ===
The advisory referendum is being called in order to obtain the opinion of the residents of the municipalities of the island of Pag - Pag and Novalja on the initiative of the residents of the municipalities of Pag and Novalja to separate the municipalities of the island of Pag from Lika-Senj County and their annexation to Zadar-Knin County. The proposals for regional affiliation of the municipalities of Pag and Novalja are:

1. The municipalities of the island of Pag - Pag and Novalja are separated from the Lika-Senj County and annexed to the Zadar-Knin County;

2. The municipalities of the island of Pag - Pag and Novalja remain in Lika-Senj County.

=== Zagreb County ===
The advisory referendum is called in order to obtain the opinion of the citizens of Zagreb County on its future regional structure. Acceptance of the first proposal, that the city of Zagreb be separated from the Zagreb County into a separate territorial, administrative and self-governing unit, in accordance with its constitutional position as the capital of Croatia, would mean that the present-day area of the Zagreb County outside the city of Zagreb (Zagreb ring) constitutes a separate county that includes the area Prigorje, Turopolje and part of Moslavina, while acceptance of the second proposal would mean that the city of Zagreb remains within the Zagreb County as a separate territorial, administrative and self-governing unit, i.e. the preservation of the current state. The proposals of the regional organization of Zagreb County are:

1. The city of Zagreb is separated from the Zagreb County into a separate territorial administrative and self-governing unit;

2. The city of Zagreb remains within the Zagreb County.

=== Novska ===
The advisory referendum is being called in order to obtain the opinion of the residents of the town of Novska on the initiative of the citizens of the town of Novska to separate the town of Novska from the Sisak-Moslavina County and annex it to the Požega-Slavonia County. The proposals for the regional affiliation of the town of Novska are:

1. The town of Novska is separated from Sisak-Moslavina County and annexed to Požega-Slavonia County;

2. The town of Novska remains in Sisak-Moslavina County.

=== Ivanić-Grad ===
The advisory referendum is being called in order to obtain the opinion of the residents of town of Ivanić-Grad on the town council's initiative to separate town of Ivanić-Grad from the Sisak-Moslavina County and annex it to the Zagreb County. The proposals for the territorial affiliation of the town of Ivanić-Grad are:

1. The town of Ivanić-Grad is separated from Sisak-Moslavina County and annexed to Zagreb County;

2. The town of Ivanić-Grad remains in Sisak-Moslavina County.

=== Kloštar Ivanić ===
The advisory referendum is being called in order to obtain the opinion of the residents of the municipality of Kloštar Ivanić on the initiative of the municipal council to separate the municipality of Kloštar Ivanić from the Sisak-Moslavina County and annex it to the Zagreb County. The proposals for the regional affiliation of the municipality of Kloštar Ivanić are:

1. The municipality of Kloštar Ivanić is separated from the Sisak-Moslavina County and annexed to the Zagreb County;

2. The municipality of Kloštar Ivanić remains in the Sisak-Moslavina County.

=== Križ ===
The advisory referendum is being called in order to obtain the opinion of the residents of the municipality of Križ on the initiative of the citizens of the municipality of Križ to separate the municipality of Križ from the Sisak-Moslavina County and annex it to the Zagreb County. The proposals for regional affiliation of the municipality of Križ are:

1. The municipality of Križ is separated from the Sisak-Moslavina County and annexed to the Zagreb County;

2. The municipality of Križ remains in Sisak-Moslavina County.

=== Našice ===
The advisory referendum is being called in order to obtain the opinion of the residents of the town of Našice on the town council's initiative to separate the town of Našice from the Požega-Slavonia County and annex it to the Osijek-Baranja County. The proposals for the regional affiliation of the town of Našice are:

1. The town of Našice is separated from Požega-Slavonia County and annexed to Osijek-Baranjska County;

2. The town of Našice remains in Požega-Slavonia County.

=== Đurđenovac ===
The advisory referendum is being called in order to obtain the opinion of the residents of the municipality of Đurđenovac on the initiative of the citizens of the municipality of Đurđenovac to separate the municipality of Đurđenovac from the Požega-Slavonia County and annex it to the Osijek-Baranja County. The proposals for the regional affiliation of the municipality of Đurđenovac are:

1. The municipality of Đurđenovac is separated from Požega-Slavonia County and annexed to Osijek-Baranja County;

2. The municipality of Đurđenovac remains in the Požega-Slavonia County.

=== Feričanci ===
The advisory referendum is being called in order to obtain the opinion of the residents of the municipality of Feričanci on the initiative of the citizens of the municipality of Feričanci to separate the municipality of Feričanci from the Požega-Slavonia County and annex it to the Osijek-Baranja County. The proposals for the territorial affiliation of the municipality of Feričanci are:

1. The municipality of Feričanci is separated from the Požega-Slavonia County and annexed to the Osijek-Baranja County;

2. The municipality of Feričanci remains in the Požega-Slavonia County.

=== Podgorač ===
The advisory referendum is being called in order to obtain the opinion of the residents of the municipality of Podgorač on the initiative of the citizens of the municipality of Podgorač to separate the municipality of Podgorač from the Požega-Slavonia County and annex it to the Osijek-Baranja County. The proposals for the regional affiliation of the municipality of Podgorač are:

1. The municipality of Podgorač is separated from the Požega-Slavonia County and annexed to the Osijek-Baranja County;

2. The municipality of Podgorač remains in Požega-Slavonia County County.

== Results ==
Question	Change		Stay		Invalid/ blank	Total votes	Registered voters	Turnout	Outcome
Question	Votes	%	Votes	%	Invalid/ blank	Total votes	Registered voters	Turnout	Outcome
Island of Pag	1,730	61.54	1,081	38.46	385	3,196	6,772	47.19	Rejected
Zagreb County	80,152	48.66	84,571	51.34	2,524	167,247	884,644	18.91	Rejected
Novska	1,268	32.12	2,680	67.88	45	3,993	13,302	30.02	Rejected
Ivanić-Grad	5,585	95.90	239	4.10	24	5,848	11,459	51.03	Approved
Kloštar Ivanić	2,207	94.60	126	5.40	12	2,345	4,304	54.48	Approved
Križ	3,396	92.76	265	7.24	35	3,696	6,307	58.60	Approved
Našice	7,603	98.40	124	1.60	21	7,748	12,492	62.02	Approved
Đurđenovac	4,124	98.07	81	1.93	14	4,219	6,677	63.19	Approved
Feričanci	2,231	97.42	59	2.58	10	2,300	3,584	64.17	Approved
Podgorač	1,701	97.31	47	2.69	9	1,757	2,672	65.76	Approved
Source: State Election Commission

== Aftermath ==
Našice, Đurđenovac, Feričanci and Podgorač voted to leave the Požega-Slavonia County and join the Osijek-Baranja County.

Ivanić-Grad, Kloštar Ivanić and Križ voted to leave the Sisak-Moslavina County and join the Zagreb County.

Referendums in Novska, Zagreb County and Island of Pag failed due the low turnout.

In 1997 Croatian Parliament change the Law on the City of Zagreb and declared it a unique territorial administrative and self-governing unit with the status of a county outside of Zagreb County.

Also in 1997 municipalities of Island of Pag were split so Novalja stayed in Lika-Senj County while Pag joined Zadar County.
