= Hinko Juhn =

- Born: 9 June 1891; Podgorač, Austria-Hungary (now Croatia)
- Died: 5 September 1940 (aged 49); Zagreb, Yugoslavia
- Education: Zagreb, Vienna
- Known for: sculpture, ceramics
- Movement: art deco

Hinko Juhn (9 June 1891 – 5 September 1940) was a Yugoslav sculptor, best known for his ceramics. He studied at the Arts & Crafts College in Zagreb and the International Academy in Florence, and took specialist classes in ceramics in the Czech Republic, Germany and at the Vienna School of Applied Arts. On his return to Zagreb, he exhibited his work at the Spring Salon and introduced ceramic techniques to a new generation of Yugoslav artists through his teaching.

== Biography ==
Juhn designed medal for Congress of Jewish youth associations.

Juhn was born on 9 June 1891 in Podgorač near Našice to a Jewish family. After two years at the high school in Osijek, at the age of 13 he enrolled in the State Craft School in Zagreb.

In 1907, he began studying sculpture at the College of Arts and Crafts in Zagreb under Robert Frangeš-Mihanović and Rudolf Valdec, graduating in 1911. He continued his studies at the International Academy in Florence, where he also held his first solo exhibition in 1912.

Juhn was one of the founders in 1916 of the Zagreb Spring Salon, where he continued to exhibit his works until 1928. He started working in ceramics, and became interested in learning more. In 1918, therefore, he went to the Czech Republic, where he studied at a specialist ceramics school in Bechyne, then at the State School of Crafts in ceramics and applied arts in Teplice Drevodan. He spent some time in Dresden at the Meissen porcelain works, then continued his ceramic studies at the Vienna School of Applied Art.

Returning to Zagreb in 1921, Juhn established a ceramics department at the College of Arts and Crafts. In 1924, he transferred to the State Craft School, where he was professor of ceramics for the rest of his career.

== Death ==
Hinko Juhn died in Zagreb on 5 September 1940, aged 49, at the Srebrnjak Sanatorium.

== Legacy ==
Although Juhn created sculptural works in many different kinds of media, he is best known for his ceramics. He was the first Croatian sculptor to specialize in that medium, and he is responsible for the popularity of the medium in Croatia between the two world wars.

Juhn was a master of miniature sculptures, mostly female nudes, in a variety of materials such as plaster, bronze and terracotta, as well as ceramics. He also created works of applied art, such as bowls, vases and candlesticks, and larger works such as sculptural reliefs for indoor public spaces.

For the 1929 World Expo in Barcelona, Juhn worked with Blanka Dužanec to create a ceramic frieze. He collaborated with architects Baranyai and Benedik on interior decoration designs.

Street and the Hinko Juhn Elementary School in Pogorac is named after its most famous former pupil.

== Exhibitions ==
Juhn exhibited frequently at home and abroad, especially at the Spring Salon in Zagreb, with the artist Society "Work" and at the international exhibition of contemporary decorative arts in Paris.

=== Group exhibitions ===
Recent exhibitions that have included works by Hinko Juhn:

- 2011 Art Deco in Croatian Art between the two world wars, Museum of Arts and Crafts, Zagreb

=== Public collections ===
Hinko Juhn's work can be found in the following public collections in Croatia:

- Croatian Academy of Sciences and Arts Glyptotheque, Zagreb
- Museum of Modern and Contemporary Art, Rijeka

== Bibliography ==
- Snješka Knežević, Aleksander Laslo (2011). Židovski Zagreb. Zagreb: AGM, Židovska općina Zagreb. ISBN 978-953-174-393-8.
