= Đurđanci =

- Village (Selo)
- Location within Croatia
- Coordinates: 45°17′24″N 18°30′07″E
- Country: Croatia
- County: Osijek-Baranja
- Municipality: Đakovo

Area
  - Total: 14.6 km^{2} (5.6 sq mi)

Population (2021)
  - Total: 370
  - Density: 25/km^{2} (66/sq mi)
- Time zone: UTC+1 (CET)
  - Summer (DST): UTC+2 (CEST)

Đurđanci is a village in Croatia.
