= Bizik family Zoo =

Bizik family zoo
- Interactive map of Bizik family zoo
- 45°29′39″N 18°07′44″E
- Date opened: 1954
- Location: Našice, Croatia
- Land area: 0.75 ha
- No. of animals: 475
- No. of species: 90

Bizik Family Zoo (Zoološki vrt obitelji Bizik) is a private zoo in Našice, Croatia, situated in Markovac Našički. It attracts 20,000 visitors per year.

The founder, Mirko Bizik, introduced the first animals (birds) in 1954, and it became a zoo in 1982 when wolves and a family collection arrived. The zoo now also includes big cats.
