= Piškorevci =

- Village (Selo)
- Location within Osijek-Baranja County Location within Croatia
- Coordinates: 45.255389°N 18.399264°E

Area
  - Total: 23.7 km^{2} (9.2 sq mi)

Population (2021)
  - Total: 1,434
  - Density: 60.5/km^{2} (157/sq mi)

Piškorevci is a village in eastern Croatia located south of Đakovo. The population is 1,907 (census 2011).
