= Bračevci =

- Village (Selo)
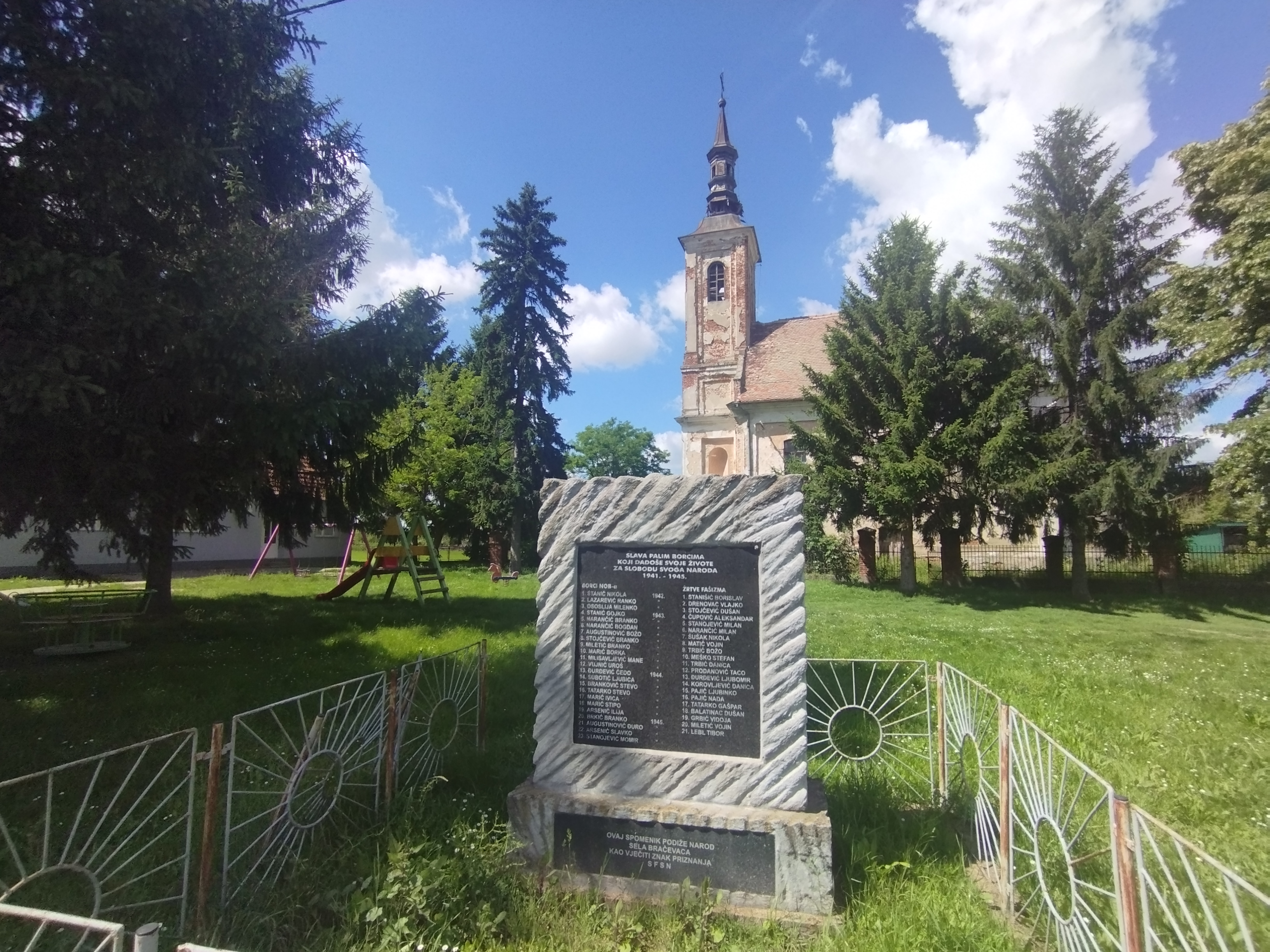
- Village centre with World War II memorial and abandoned Serbian Orthodox Church in the background.

- Location within Osijek-Baranja County Location within Croatia Location within Europe
- Country: Croatia
- County: Osijek-Baranja
- Municipality: Drenje

Area
  - Total: 4.4 sq mi (11.5 km^{2})

Population (2021)
  - Total: 149
  - Density: 33.6/sq mi (13.0/km^{2})
- Time zone: UTC+1 (CET)
  - Summer (DST): UTC+2 (CEST)

Bračevci is a village in Croatia. It is served by the D515 highway.

== Name ==
The name of the village in Croatian is plural.
