= Lake Lapovac =

- Location within Croatia
- Coordinates: 45°28′18″N 18°06′47″E
- Type: reservoir
- Basin countries: Croatia
- Max. length: 2,630 m (8,630 ft)
- Max. width: 250 m (820 ft)
- Surface elevation: 128 m (420 ft)

Lake Lapovac is an accumulation lake located between Našice and Markovac Našički, in Croatia.

== Sources ==
- https://www.tznasice.hr/izdvojene-destinacije/jezero-lapovac/ (in Croatian)
