= Mandićevac =

Village in Osijek-Baranja County, Croatia

Coordinates: 45°22′11″N 18°14′55″E

- Village (Selo)
- Interactive map of Mandićevac

Mandićevac (German: Manditschdorf) is a village near Drenje, Osijek-Baranja County, Croatia. In the 2011 census, it had 284 inhabitants.
