= Vehicle registration plates of Montenegro =

Montenegro
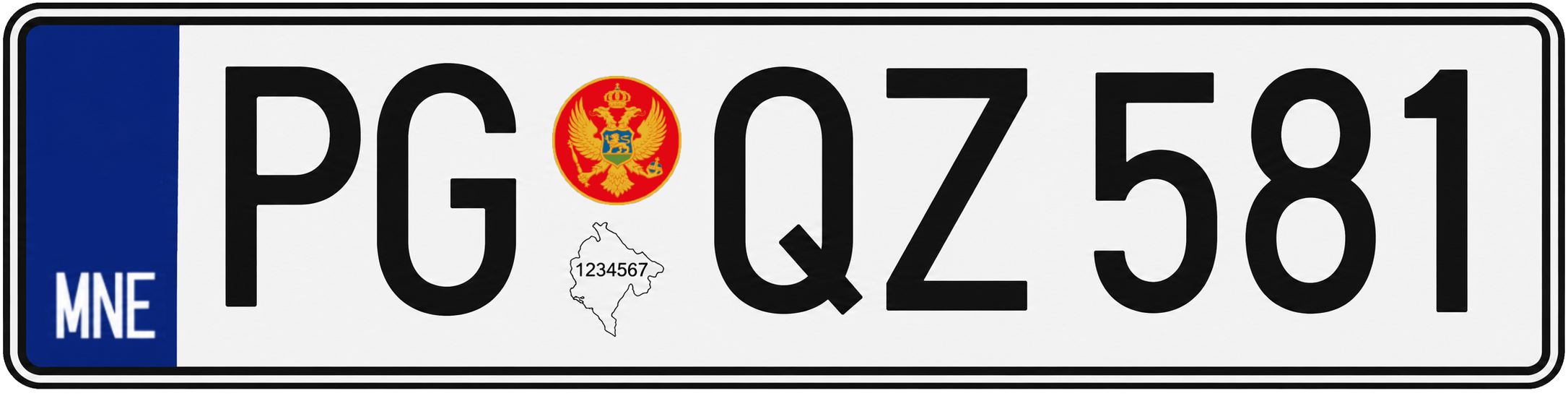
- Montenegrin regular legal standard number plate
- Country: Montenegro
- Country code: MNE

Current series
- Size: 520 mm × 110 mm 20.5 in × 4.3 in
- Colour (front): Black on white
- Colour (rear): Black on white

Previous design

Montenegrin car plates have black characters on a rectangular white background, with a blue strip on the left. Car, but not motorcycle, plates follow the 520 mm x 110 mm format. The old Yugoslav plate format was phased out from 6 June 2008 in favour of this format, which is on par with the common European Union format.

== Overview ==
The plate is in following layout: to the left, a blue-colored field contains Montenegro's international automobile code (MNE); continuing in white background, the two-letter code of the municipality where the vehicle was registered in, then the coat-of-arms of Montenegro following by the registration code, which generally consists of two letters followed by three numbers. However, it is possible to pay for customized plates with any letter-number combination.

Letters I and O are omitted in serial combinations because of the similarity with the numbers 1 and 0, but they can be used on a customized plate amongst other letters which are omitted: W, X, Y, Q and Serbo-Croatian Latin Alphabet letters (Č,Ć,Š,Đ,Ž).

Police vehicles have plates with blue letters, while military vehicles have plates with green letters. The diplomatic corps cars have licence plates in a different format, with no municipality code, coat of arms, and with yellow code on white background. The plates used on bigger trucks and other vehicles that can be oversized for some of the smaller roads are red with white characters.

Unlike the older licence plates inherited from the SFRY-era, and slightly changed in 1998, the licence plates have a separate area code for every municipality in Montenegro. The municipalities that were previously absent were Andrijevica, Danilovgrad, Kolašin, Mojkovac, Plav, Plužine, Rožaje, Šavnik, Tivat and Žabljak.

== Municipal codes ==
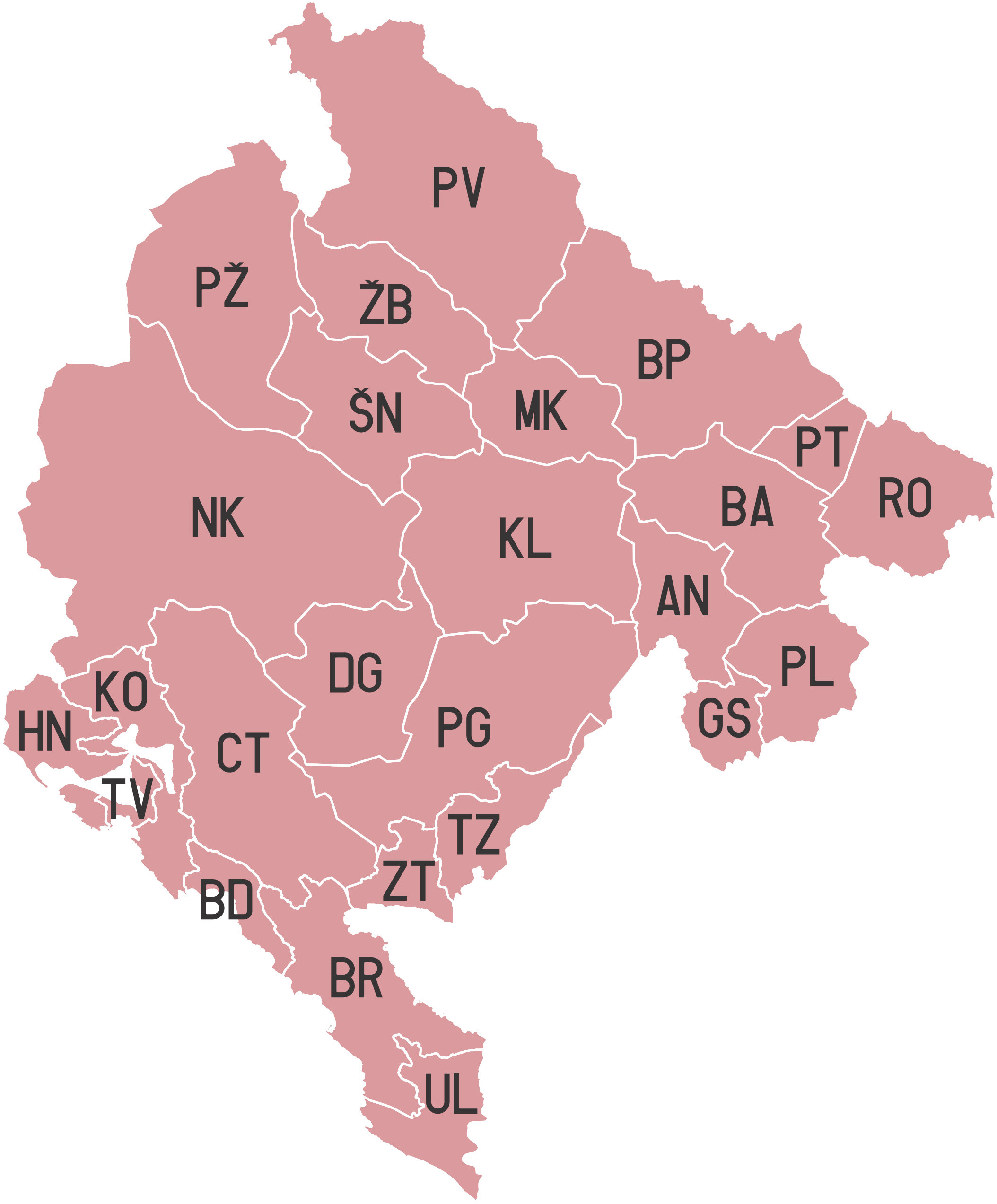
Map of Montenegrin plate codes.

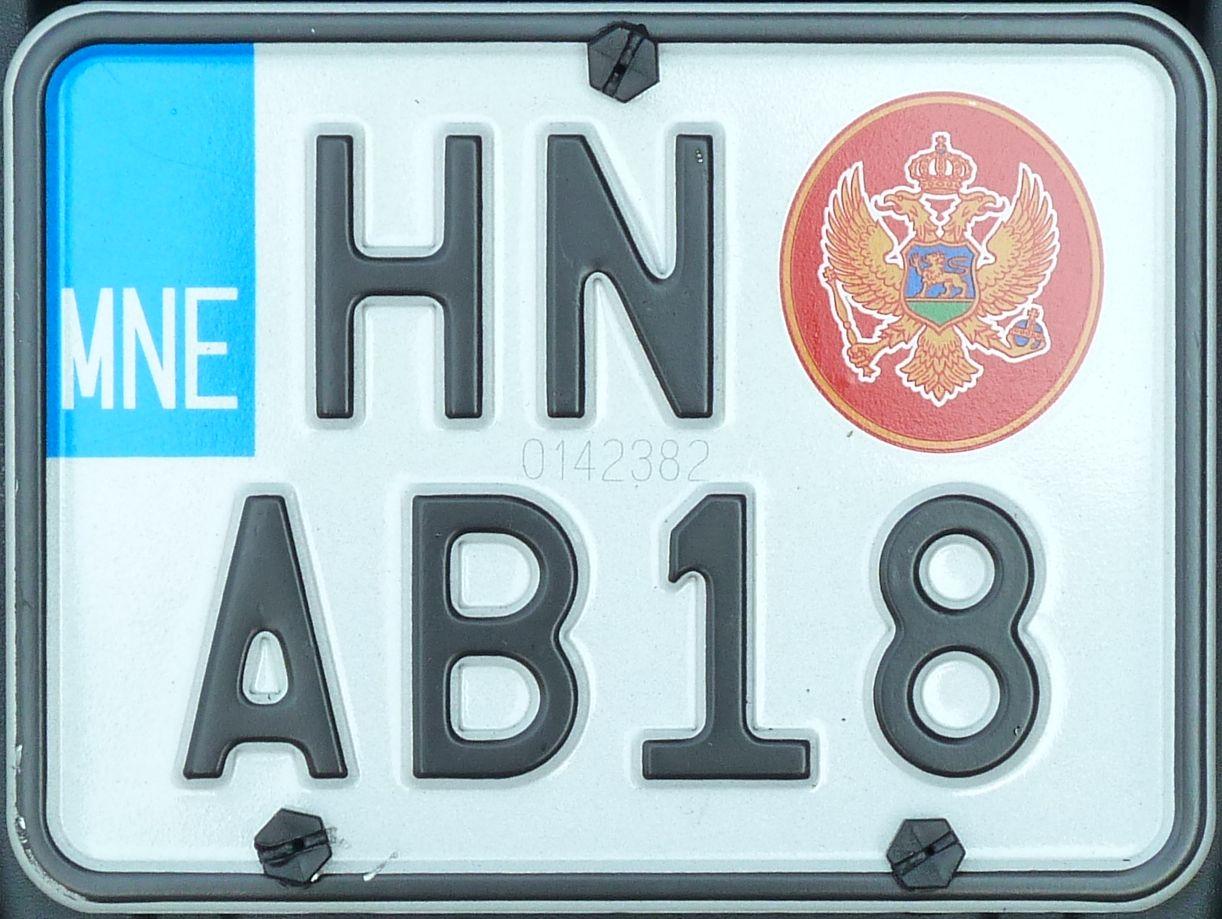
License plate for mopeds

These are the Montenegrin car license plate codes by municipality and in alphabetical order:

Car plate code	Location	Image	Registered motor vehicles (2025)
AN	Andrijevica		1324
BA	Berane		10136
BD	Budva		18879
BP	Bijelo Polje		15092
BR	Bar		26741
CT	Cetinje		8406
DG	Danilovgrad		8178
GS	Gusinje		1017
HN	Herceg Novi		18200
KL	Kolašin		2776
KO	Kotor		15108
MK	Mojkovac		2537
NK	Nikšić		31053
PG	Podgorica		104568
PL	Plav		2801
PT	Petnjica		1334
PŽ	Plužine		747
PV	Pljevlja		9929
RO	Rožaje		7662
ŠN	Šavnik		484
TV	Tivat		12002
TZ	Tuzi		5360
UL	Ulcinj		12450
ZT	Zeta		8481
ŽB	Žabljak		1446

== Special types ==
=== Diplomatic license plates ===
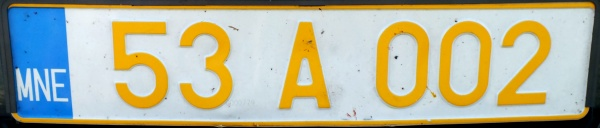
Diplomatic plate (53 – Norway)

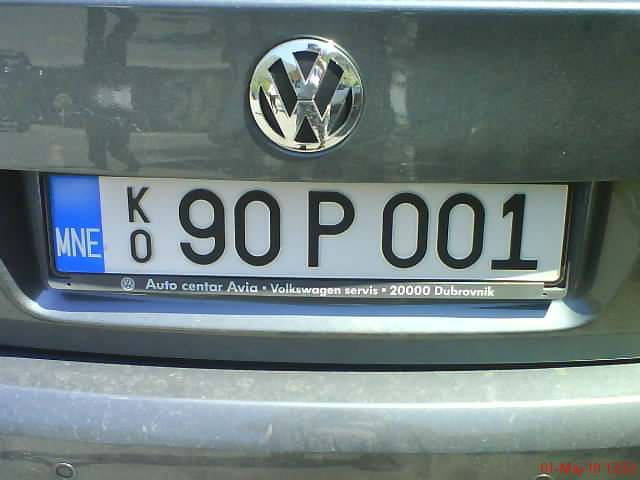
Diplomatic plate owned by a foreign press agency

Vehicles operated by foreign embassies, consulates, consular and diplomatic staff and various international organizations have been given plates with a distinguishing format of two (or three) numbers, one letter, three numbers, e.g., 12(3)–X–456. Vehicle owned by a diplomat, by accredited non-diplomatic staff or by a consular carries a plate with characters printed in yellow on a white background while the vehicle owned by a foreign press agency, a foreign cultural representative or by an office of a foreign company and/or its staff, has plates with characters printed in black on a white background, as normal ones.
The first group of two/three numbers (123) identifies the country or organization to which the plate has been issued, the second group of three numbers (456) is a serial number. The letter in the middle (X) is denoting the status of the owner.

Code	Explanation
A	vehicle is owned by a diplomat
M	vehicle is owned by accredited non-diplomatic staff – Mission
P	vehicle is owned by a foreign press agency or a foreign cultural representative – Press
E	vehicle is owned by an office of a foreign company and/or its staff – Economy
C	vehicle is owned by a consulate or their staff which have consular status – Consul
CMD	additional oval plate for vehicles used by the chief of a diplomatic mission – Chef de Mission Diplomatique
CD	additional oval plate for vehicles used by a person with diplomatic status – Corps Diplomatique

List of codes by country (not complete):

Code	Country
10	Russia
11	Turkey
12	Albania
16	Belgium
18	Bosnia and Herzegovina
20	China
25	Bulgaria
26	Czech Republic
30	United Kingdom
32	Finland
33	Sweden
34	Denmark
35	France
36	The Netherlands
40	Germany
41	Italy
43	Switzerland
44	Austria
45	Greece
53	Norway
55	Hungary
60	USA
62	Slovakia
63	Canada
65	Poland
69	Ukraine
70	Serbia
75	Romania
80	Slovenia
85	Bosnia and Herzegovina
86	Japan
90	Croatia
95	North Macedonia
96	Georgia
100	EU
101	ECPD
102	UNWFP
105	EAR
110	United Nations
111	OSCE
112	ICRC

=== Agricultural plates ===
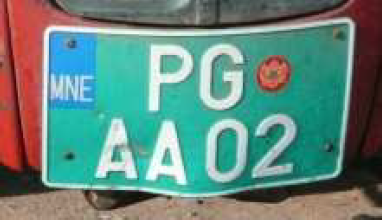
Montenegro agricultural plate

Agricultural machines such as tractors have Montenegrin agricultural plates with white characters on a light-green background. The plates bear the two-letter code of the municipality where the vehicle is registered followed by the coat-of-arms of Montenegro, with two letters and two digits below.

=== Government codes ===
These plate formats are very similar to civilian plates.

- P – Police
- V – Military

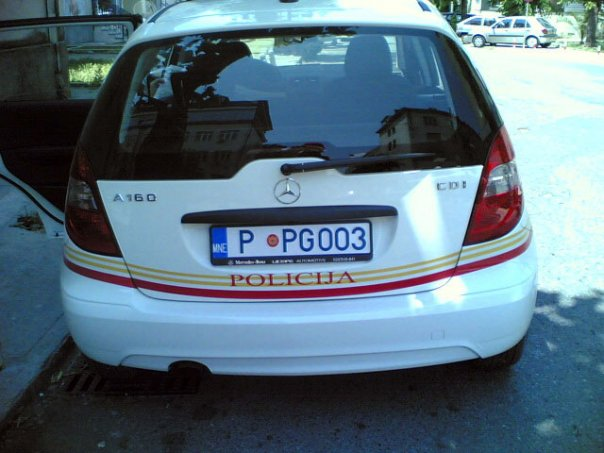
Police plate

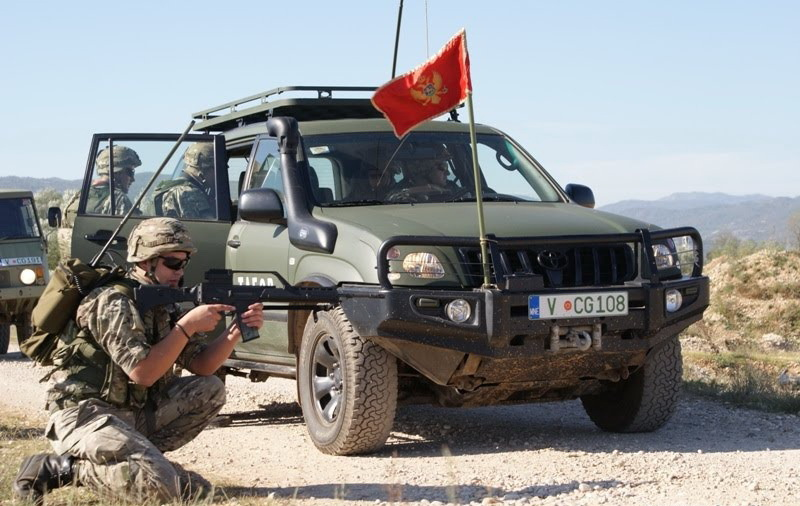
Military plate

=== Temporary plates ===
Temporary license plate

Temporary license plates show after the coat of arms the letters RP over each other as well as a two digit representing year number. RP means registrovan privremeno which means registered temporarily. The license plate concludes with three digits. Temporary plates are used among other possible uses for vehicles owned by temporary residents.

=== Plates for oldtimers ===
Montenegro also has special plates for oldtimers. These plates are issued only to certified oldtimers which have passed a thorough inspection. The plates consist of two-letter code of the municipality where the vehicle is registered, then the coat-of-arms of Montenegro followed by OT letter combination and three serial numbers. The characters are printed in black on a brown background.

== Specific serial combinations ==
License plates with CG and MN letter pairs are reserved for vehicles owned and operated by Government of Montenegro. Traditionally, PG CG001 is used by the President of Montenegro official state car.

License plates with TX starting letter pair are mandatory for registered taxi service vehicles in each municipality.
