= Razbojište =

- Village (Selo)
- Location within Osijek-Baranja County Location within Croatia Location within Europe
- Country: Croatia
- County: Osijek-Baranja County
- Municipality: Podgorač

Area
  - Total: 6.0 km^{2} (2.3 sq mi)

Population (2021)
  - Total: 258
  - Density: 43/km^{2} (110/sq mi)
- Time zone: UTC+1 (CET)
  - Summer (DST): UTC+2 (CEST)

Razbojište is a village in Croatia. It is connected by the D515 highway.
