= Vukojevci =

- Village (Selo)
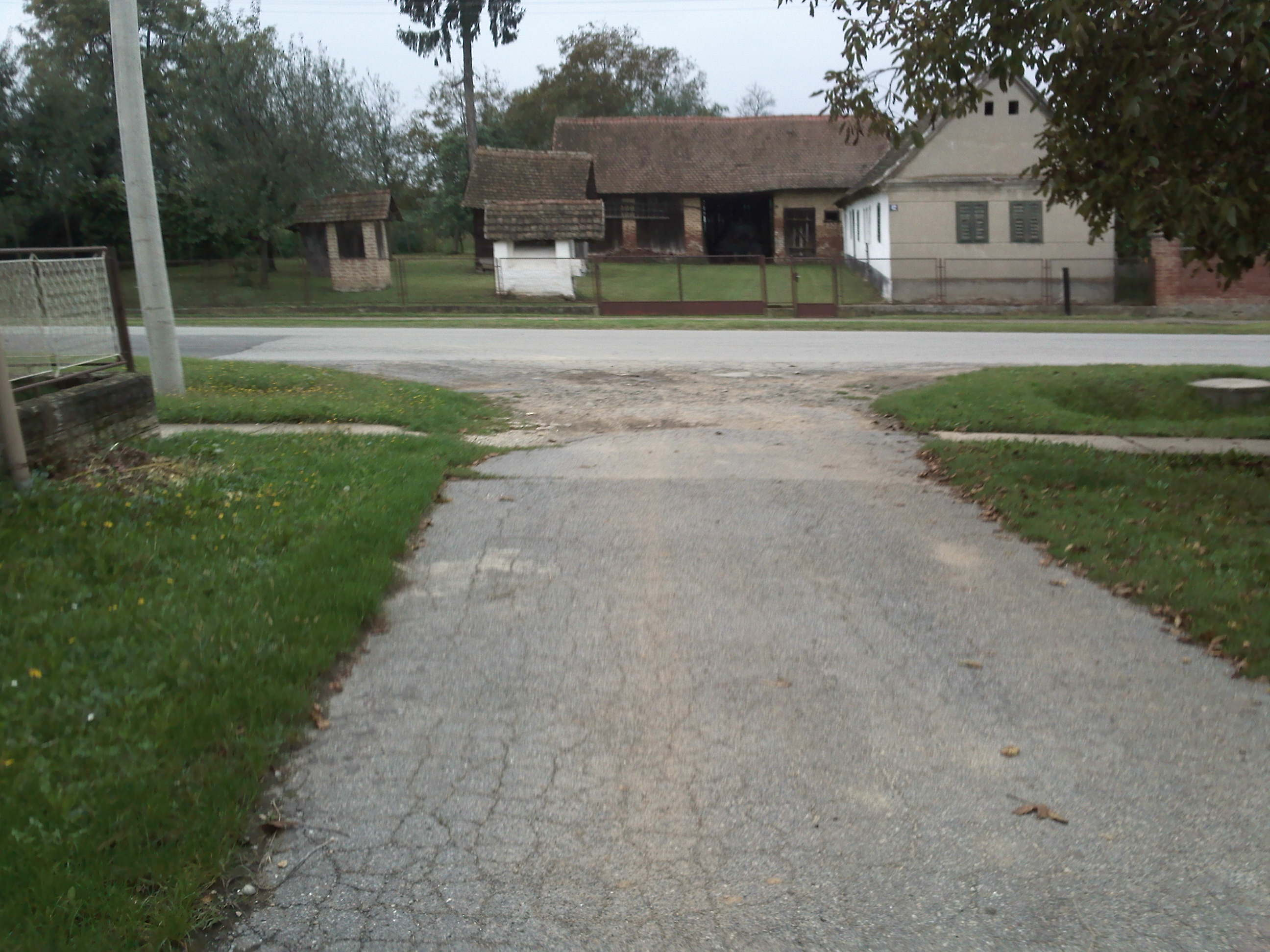

- Location within Osijek-Baranja County Location within Croatia
- Country: Croatia
- County: Osijek-Baranja
- Municipality: Našice

Area
  - Total: 5.0 sq mi (12.9 km^{2})

Population (2021)
  - Total: 713
  - Density: 143/sq mi (55.3/km^{2})
- Time zone: UTC+1 (CET)
  - Summer (DST): UTC+2 (CEST)

Vukojevci is a village in Croatia. It is connected by the D515 highway.
