= Ivanovci Đakovački =

Ivanovci Đakovački Ivanovci Gorjanski
- Village (Selo)
- Interactive map of Ivanovci Đakovački
- Location of Ivanovci Đakovački in Osijek-Baranja County
- Coordinates: 45°21′58″N 18°24′40″E
- Country: Croatia
- County: Osijek-Baranja
- Town: Đakovo

Area
  - Total: 3.3 sq mi (8.6 km^{2})

Population (2021)
  - Total: 503
  - Density: 150/sq mi (58/km^{2})
- Time zone: UTC+1 (CET)
  - Summer (DST): UTC+2 (CEST)
- Postal code: 31400
- Vehicle registration: DJ

Ivanovci Đakovački is a village in Croatia. It is administratively located in the Town of Đakovo. According to the 2011 census, the village has a population of 508.

Before 2011, the village was called Ivanovci Gorjanski.
