= Đakovo =

- Town
- Grad Đakovo; Town of Đakovo
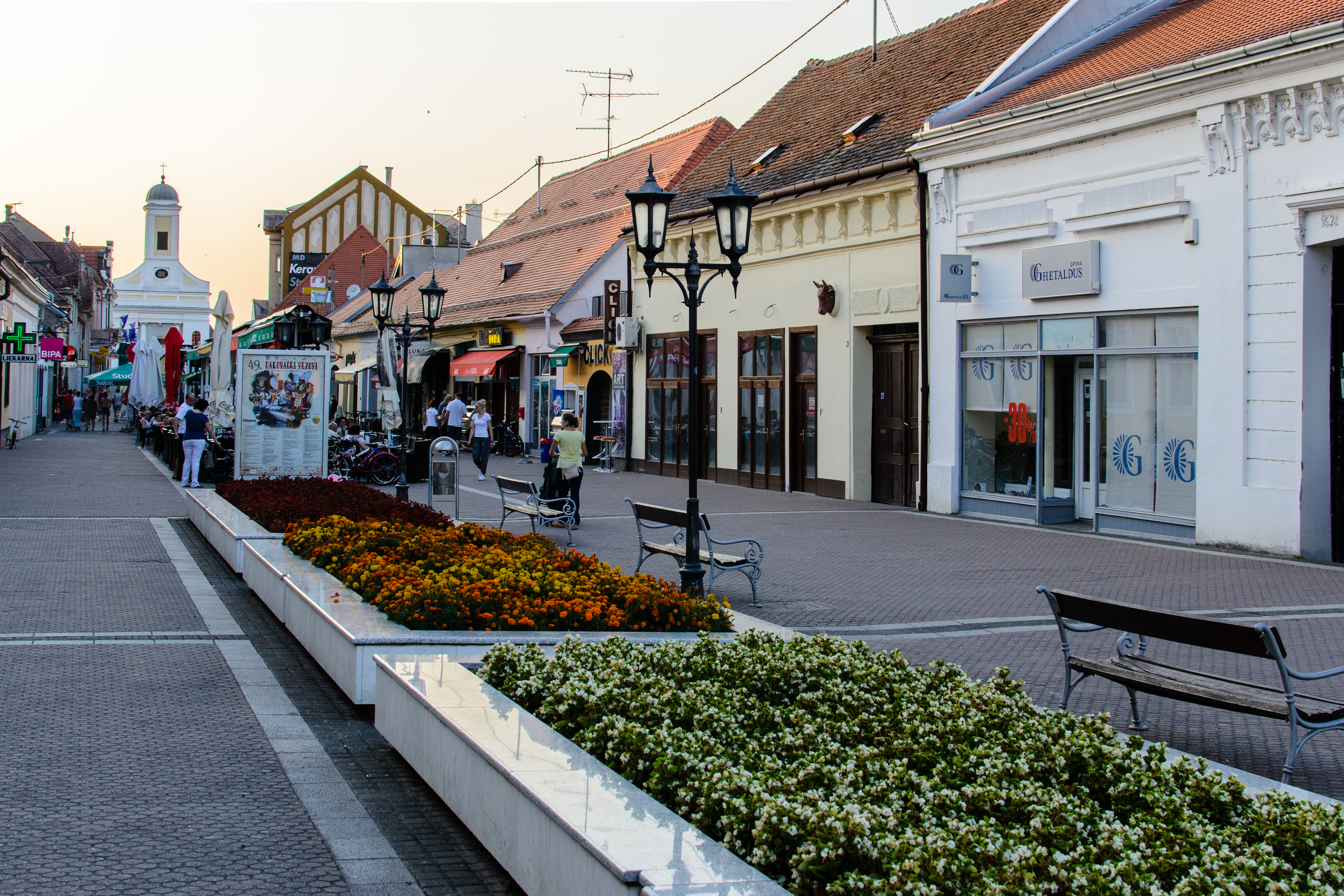
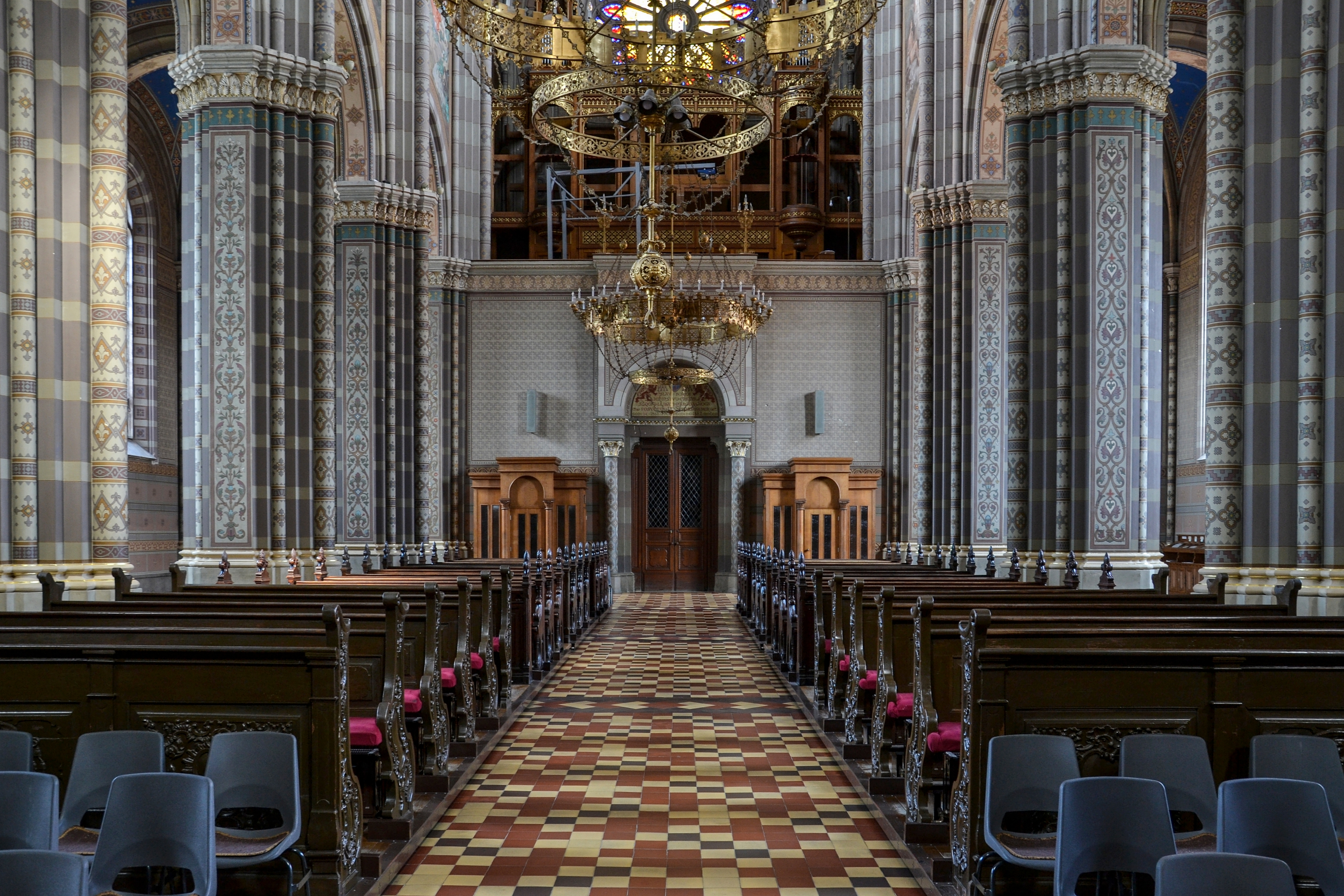
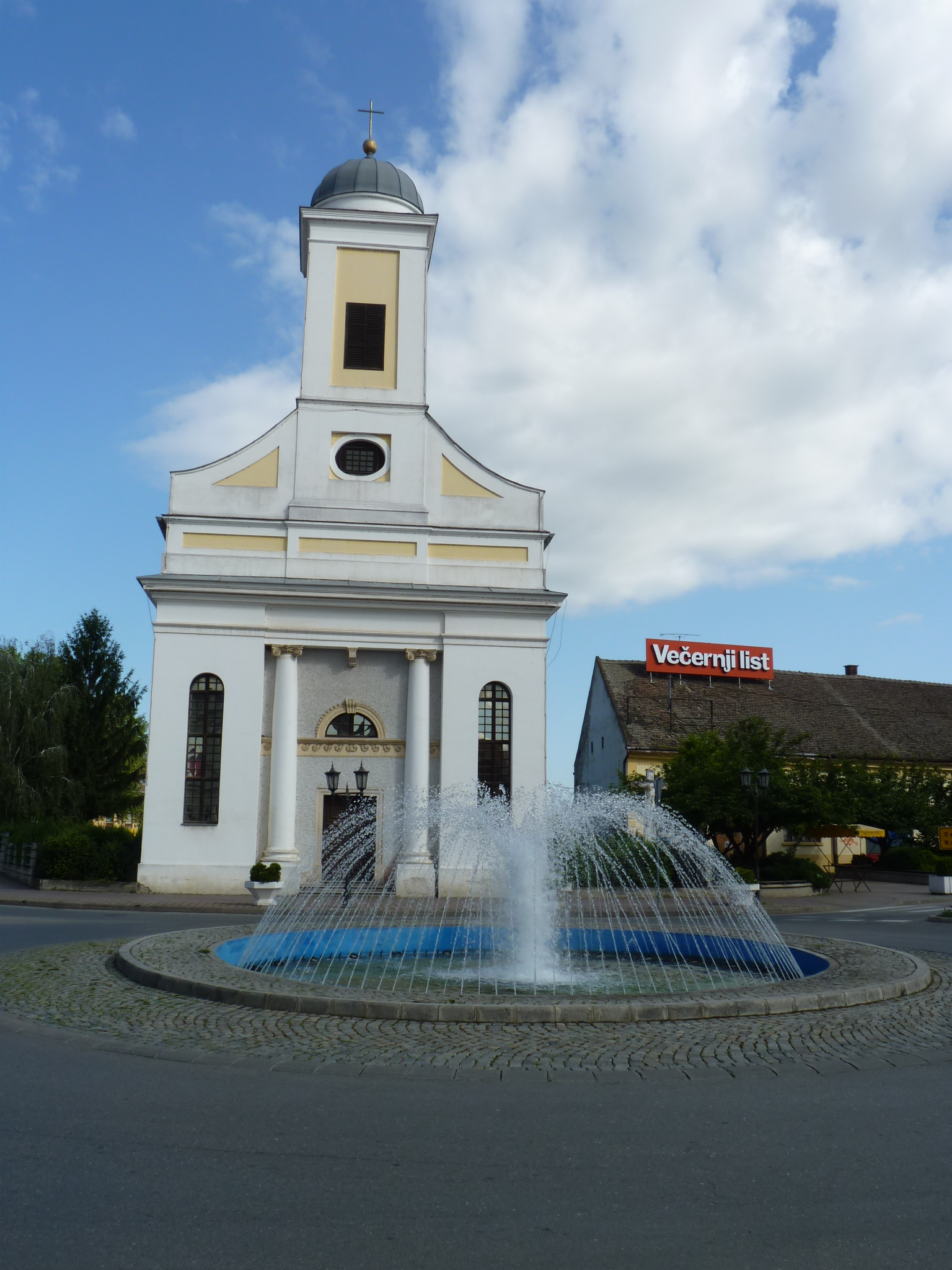
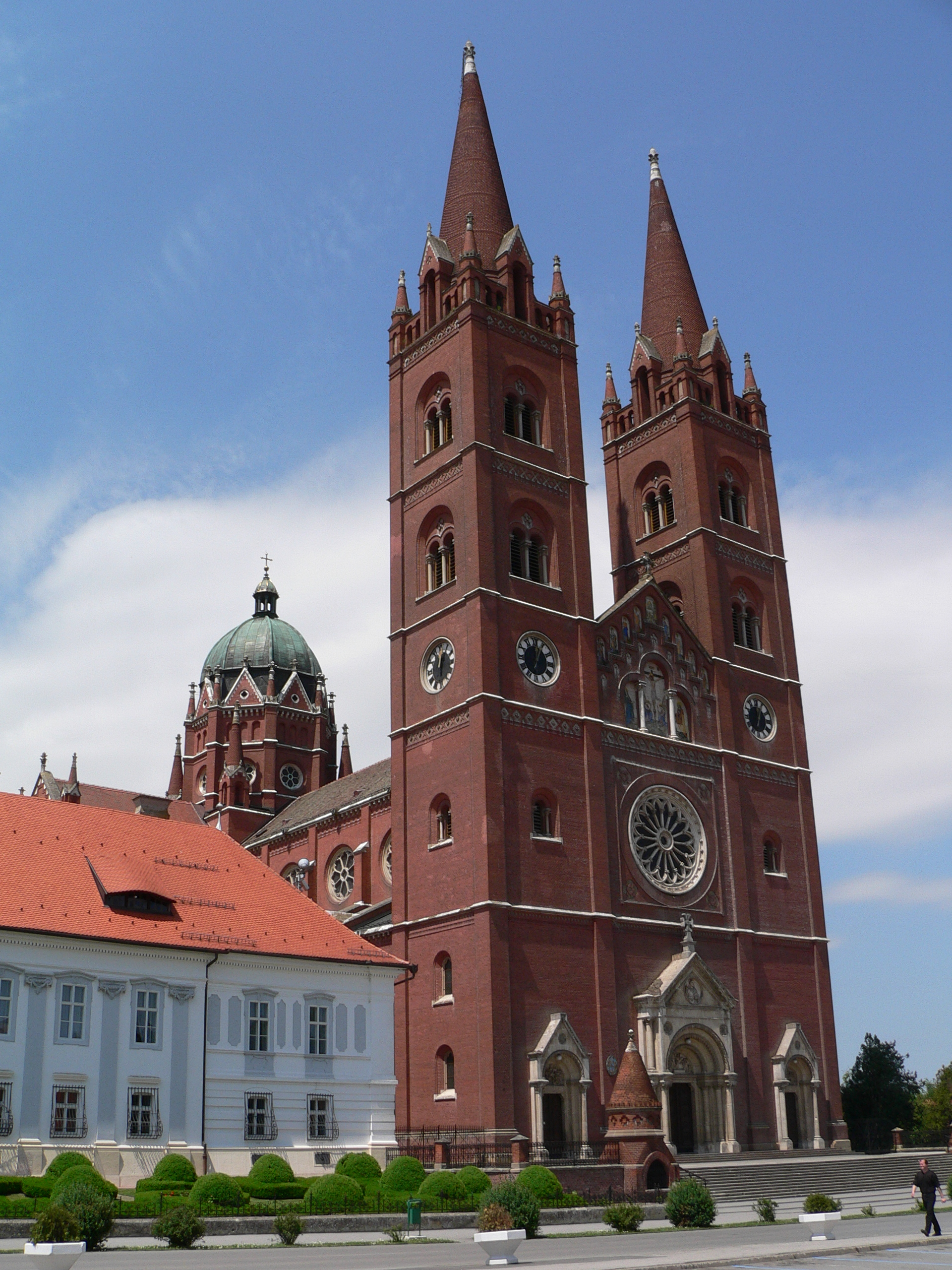
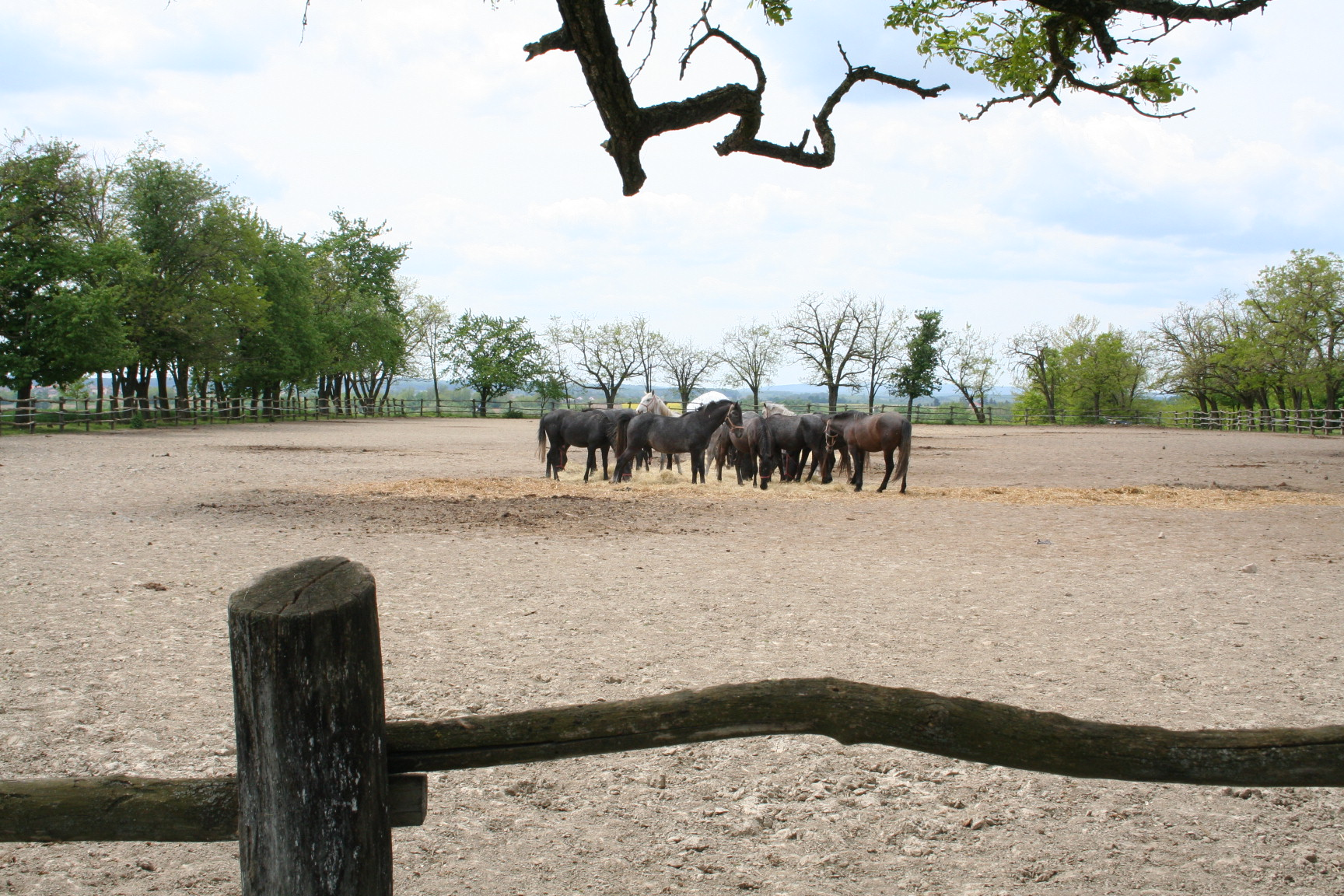
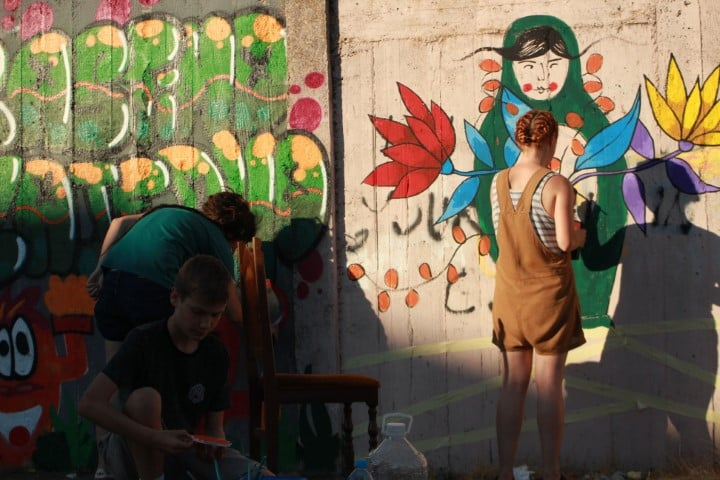
- Đakovo

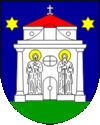
- Seal
- Nickname: Srce Slavonije (The Heart of Slavonia)
- Interactive map of Đakovo
- Location of Đakovo in Croatia Đakovo (Croatia) Đakovo (Europe)
- Coordinates: 45.31°N 18.41°E
- Country: Croatia
- Region: Slavonia
- County: Osijek-Baranja County

Government
  - Mayor: Marin Mandarić (HDZ)

Area
  - Town: 169.2 km^{2} (65.3 sq mi)
  - Urban: 39.0 km^{2} (15.1 sq mi)
- Elevation: 111 m (364 ft)

Population (2021)
  - Town: 23,577
  - Density: 139.3/km^{2} (360.9/sq mi)
  - Urban: 16,875
  - Urban density: 433/km^{2} (1,120/sq mi)
- Time zone: UTC+1 (CET)
  - Summer (DST): UTC+2 (CEST)
- Postal code: HR-31 400
- Area code: +385 31
- Vehicle registration: DJ
- Arable land area: 13,505 ha
- Forested land area: 2,044 ha
- Website: djakovo.hr

Đakovo (pronounced [ˈdʑakɔʋɔ]; Hungarian: Diakovár, German: Diakowar, Serbian Cyrillic: Ђаково) is a town in the region of Slavonia, Croatia. Đakovo is the centre of the fertile and rich Đakovo region (Croatian: Đakovština [d͡ʑakǒːʋʃtina]).

== Etymology ==
The etymology of the name is the Greek: διάκος (diákos) in Slavic form đak (pupil). The Hungarian diák word has the same Greek origin and it is uncertain whether the name came directly from Greek, Hungarian, or local Slavic form.

== History ==
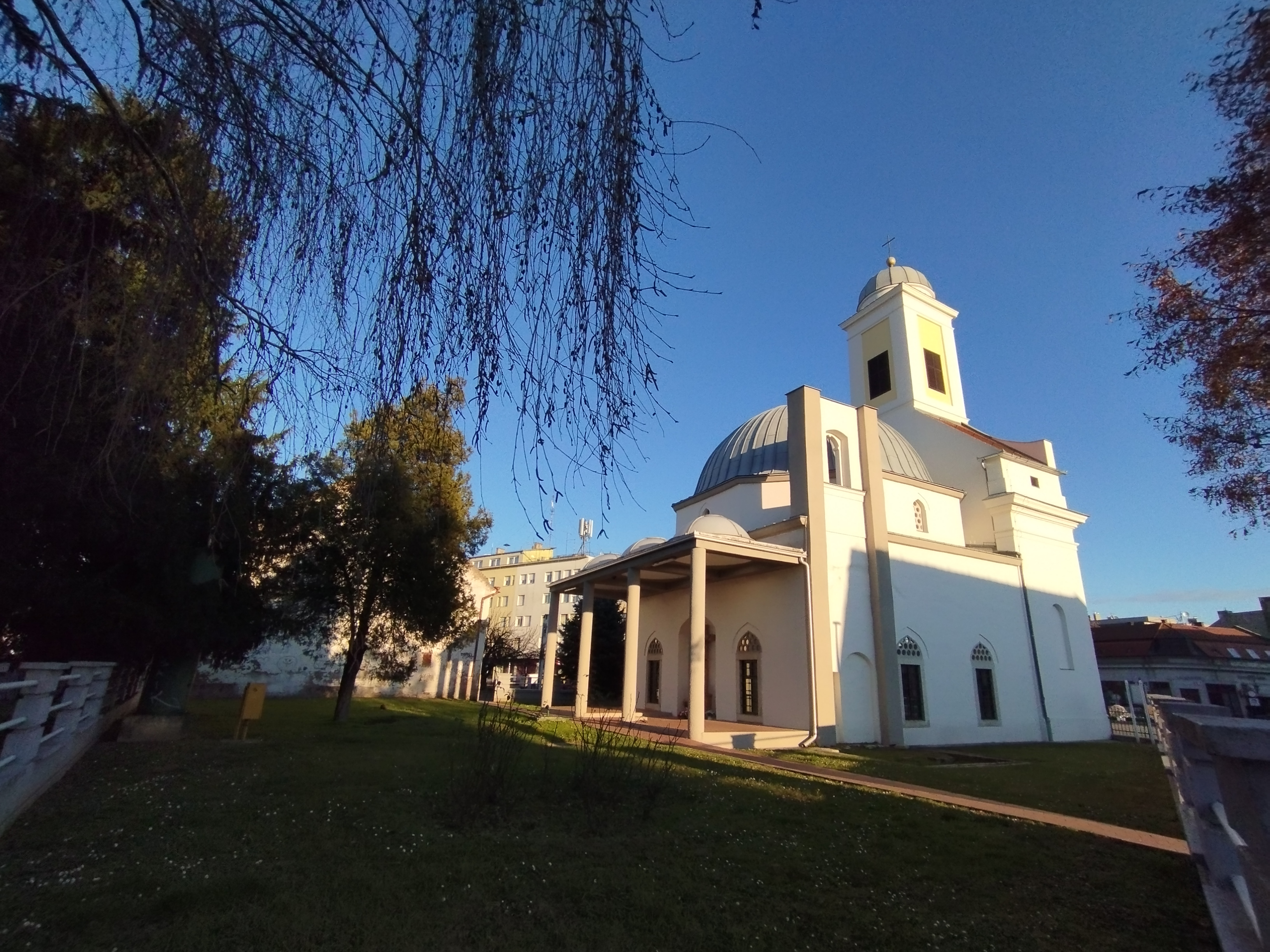
Church of the All Saints (former Ottoman era mosque).

In Roman antiquity the settlement Certissia stood on the same spot until it disappeared during the Migration Period.

The settlement's first mention in historical documents dates from 1239 when Béla IV of Hungary granted it to the Diocese of Bosnia (Latin: Dioecesis Bosniensis), and the bishop moved his seat here in 1246. The predecessor to the newer St. Peter's Cathedral was built in 1355. In 1374 the settlement is documented under the name Dyacou. Croatian rebels in 1386 on 25 July captured Queen Mary of Hungary and her mother Elizabeth near the settlement.

The Ottoman rule over Đakovo started following the Battle of Gorjani in 1537 and lasted for nearly 150 years. It was a kaza administrative center in Sanjak of Pojega and was known as "Yakova" during this period. In 1805 a Lipizzan horse herd was evacuated to Đakovo when Napoleon invaded Austria & Hungary and a part of the herd remained permanently there. In a 1910 census the settlement's total population of 6304 was made of 4894 Croatians, 890 Germans, 249 Hungarians and 164 Serbians. In the late 19th and early 20th century the settlement was a district capital in the Virovitica County of the Kingdom of Croatia-Slavonia within the Lands of the Crown of Saint Stephen. From 1 December 1941 until 7 July 1942 the Ustaše established and operated the Đakovo internment camp, mostly for Jewish, Roma and Serb women and children.

== Geography ==
Đakovo is located 37 km (23 mi) to the southwest of Osijek and 34 km (21 mi) southeast of Našice; elevation 111 m. It is located near the A5 motorway, at the intersection of the D7 state road to Osijek, the arterial roads D38 to Požega, D46 to Vinkovci and the connecting road D515 to Našice.

== Climate ==
Since records began in 1981, the highest temperature recorded at the local weather station was 40.6 °C (105.1 °F), on 6 August 2012. The coldest temperature was −26.0 °C (−14.8 °F), on 31 January 1987.

== Demographics ==
According to the 2011 census, there were 27,745 residents in the administrative area, of which 19,491 were in Đakovo itself. The town consists of following settlements:

- Budrovci, population 1,260
- Đakovo, population 19,491
- Đurđanci, population 425
- Ivanovci Đakovački, population 580
- Kuševac, population 1,028
- Novi Perkovci, population 246
- Piškorevci, population 1,907
- Selci Đakovački, population 1,796
- Široko Polje, population 1,012
Town of Đakovo: Population trends 1857–2021
v

population	8087	9065	8752	10412	12233	13803	14215	15602	17432	18381	21507	25251	27304	29493	30092	27745	23577
	1857	1869	1880	1890	1900	1910	1921	1931	1948	1953	1961	1971	1981	1991	2001	2011	2021

Sources: Croatian Bureau of Statistics publications

== Politics ==
=== Minority councils ===
Directly elected minority councils and representatives are tasked with consulting the local or regional authorities, advocating for minority rights and interests, integration into public life and participation in the management of local affairs. At the 2023 Croatian national minorities councils and representatives elections Serbs of Croatia fulfilled legal requirements to elect 15 members minority councils of the Town of Đakovo but the elections were not held due to the lack of candidates.

== Economy ==
Chief occupations include farming, livestock breeding, leather and wool processing; horse selection centre; major industries are wood processing (furniture), textiles, chemicals and food processing, building material, printing and tourism.

== Culture ==
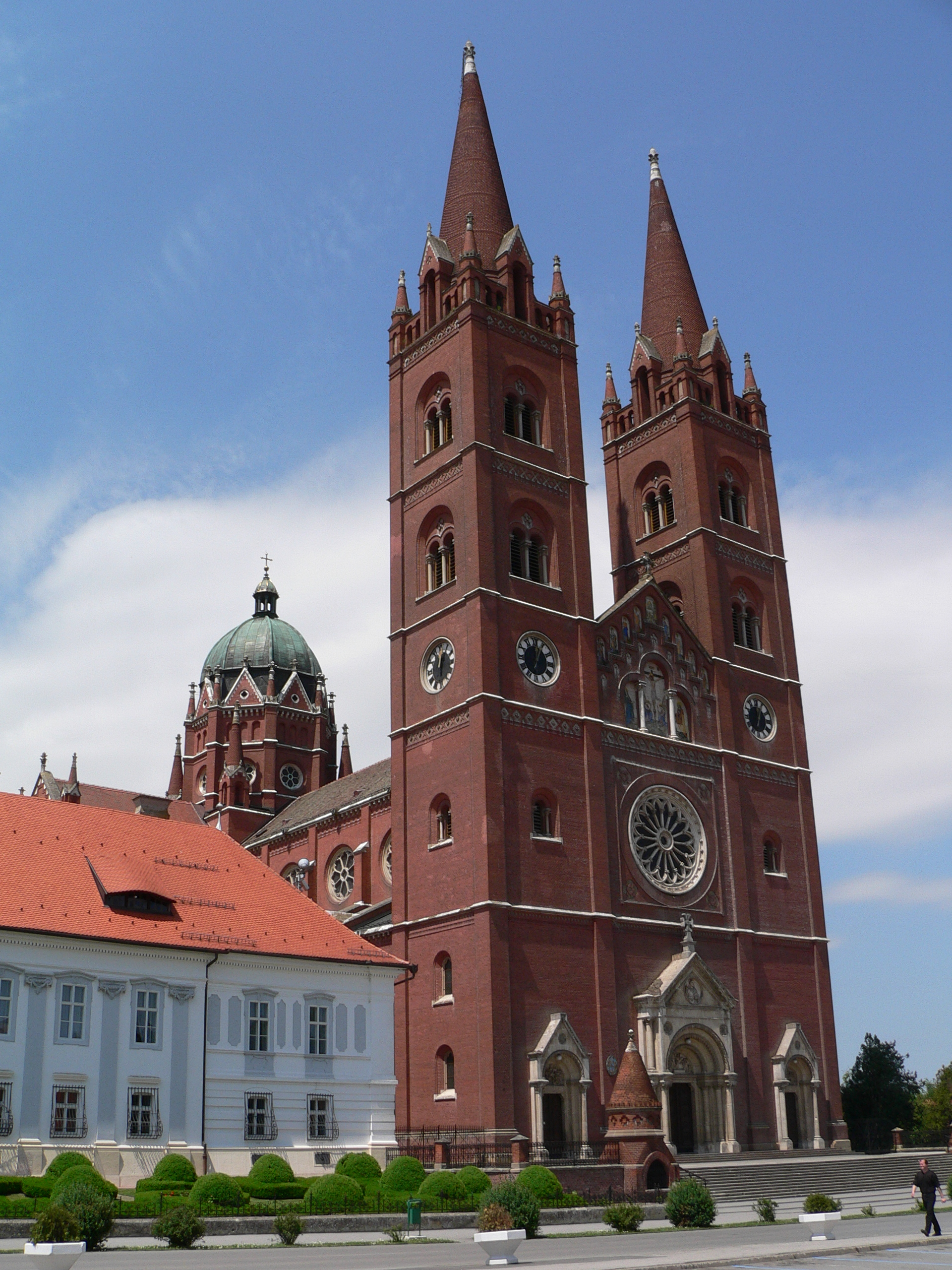
St. Peter's Cathedral in Đakovo was built under bishop Josip Juraj Strossmayer.

The Cathedral basilica of St. Peter in Đakovo is the town's most famous landmark and the most important sacral object, not only in Đakovo but also throughout the whole region of Slavonia. The cathedral was built 1866-1882 under Josip Juraj Strossmayer, then the Catholic bishop of Đakovo and Srijem. The landscaped park from the 19th century near the bishop's palace is a horticultural monument under special protection as well as the nearby Small Park (Mali Park) dating from the turn of the 19th/20th century.

The central traditional event is called Đakovački vezovi (Đakovo Embroidery). It is a folklore show of the regions Slavonia and Baranja that is organized yearly in the beginning of July, and it presents traditional folk costumes, folklore dancing and singing groups, customs. The cathedral hosts choirs, opera artists, and art exhibitions are organized in the exhibition salon. The horse and wedding wagon show is a special part of the program. During the sports program, pure-bred white Lipizzaner horses can be seen on the racecourse. They come from the horse-breeding centre in Ivandvor, which has been breeding horses ever since 1506.

The town and the surroundings offer many sports and recreation facilities, such as tennis courts, racecourse, gym, swimming pool, etc. The lakes Jošava, Mlinac, Borovik as well as fishponds, backwaters and canals offer fine angling opportunities. High and low game hunting is possible in the immediate surroundings or farther on the Dilj and mountain to the southwest. The traditional Slavonian cuisine, famous for its meat specialities (kulin smoked sausage, kobasica sausages, smoked ham), venison and freshwater fish dishes are offered both in Đakovo and its surroundings. Of particular interest are the exquisite wines of the Đakovo region: Weissburgunder, Traminer and Riesling.

== International relations ==
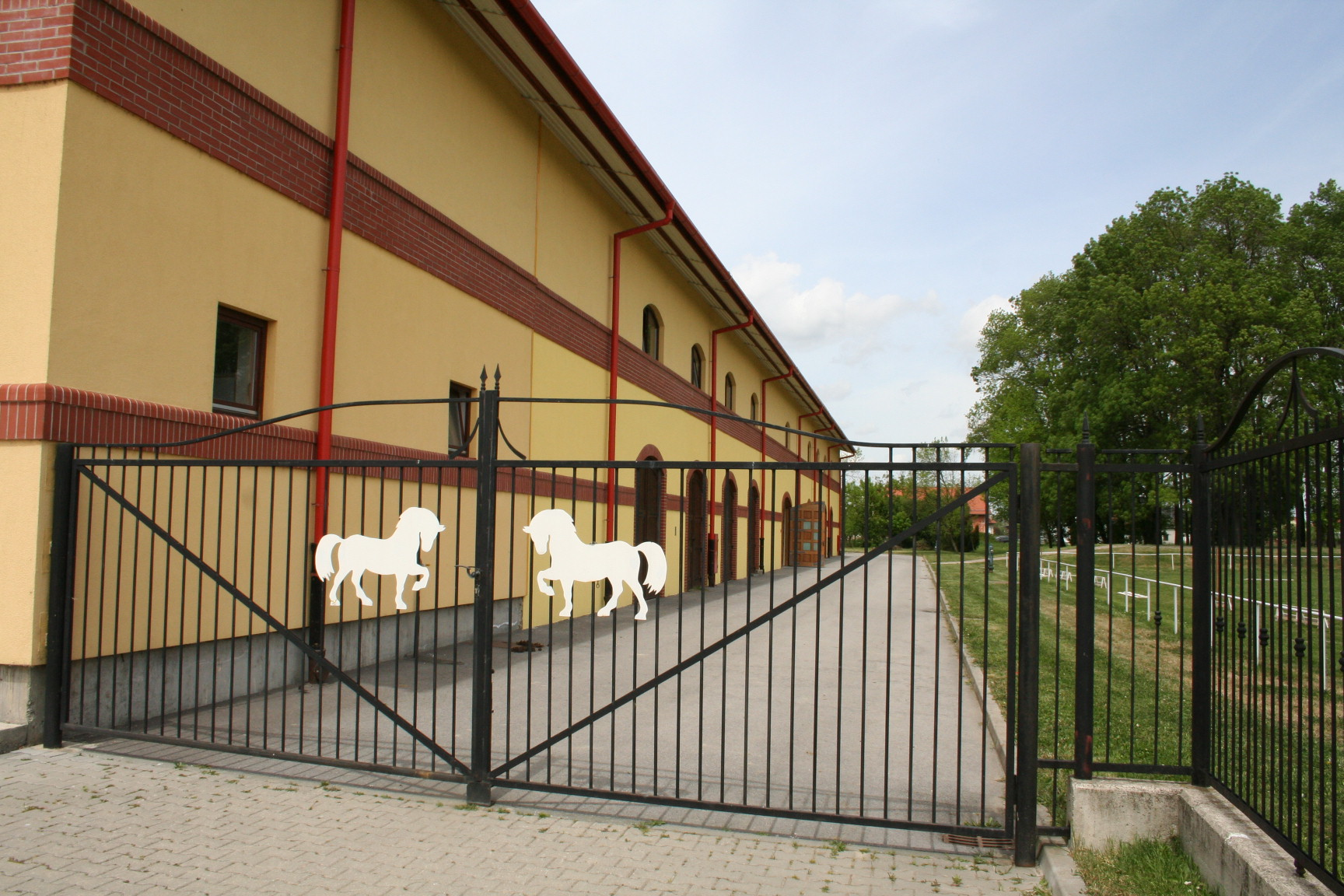
Lipizzan horse farm in Ivandvor

=== Twin towns – Sister cities ===
Đakovo is twinned with:

- Makarska, Croatia
- Sinj, Croatia
- Tomislavgrad, Bosnia and Herzegovina
- Malgersdorf, Germany
- Kirchenthumbach, Germany
- Óbuda-Békásmegyer, Hungary

== Notable people ==
- Domagoj Duvnjak, handball player
- Branka Raunig, archaeologist and museum curator
- Ivan Vargić, footballer
