= Stipanovci =

- Village (Selo)
- Location within Osijek-Baranja County Location within Croatia Location within Europe
- Country: Croatia

Area
  - Total: 2.5 km^{2} (0.97 sq mi)

Population (2021)
  - Total: 367
  - Density: 150/km^{2} (380/sq mi)
- Time zone: UTC+1 (CET)
  - Summer (DST): UTC+2 (CEST)

Stipanovci is a village in Croatia. It is served by the D515 highway.
