= Markovac Našički =

- Location within Croatia
- Coordinates: 45°30′N 18°08′E
- Country: Croatia
- County: Osijek-Baranja
- City: Našice

Area
  - Total: 7.0 km^{2} (2.7 sq mi)

Population (2021)
  - Total: 1,396
  - Density: 200/km^{2} (520/sq mi)
- Time zone: UTC+1 (CET)
  - Summer (DST): UTC+2 (CEST)

Markovac Našički is a settlement in region Slavonia, Osijek-Baranja County, near Našice, Croatia. Population is 1,586 (2011). In Markovac is situated a private Bizik family Zoo. Between Markovac and Nasice is situated an accumulation Lake Lapovac.

== Population ==
Populations by years
1857	1869	1880	1890	1900	1910	1921	1931	1948	1953	1961	1971	1981	1991	2001
0	0	315	654	818	996	1122	1035	1319	1352	1493	1566	1592	1657	1715
