= Potnjani =

- Village (Selo)
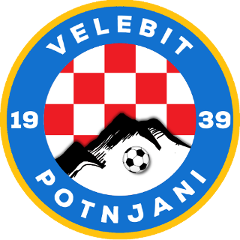
- NK Velebit logo (Croatian football team)

- Location within Osijek-Baranja County Location within Croatia Location within Europe
- Country: Croatia
- County: Osijek-Baranja County

Area
  - Total: 11.4 km^{2} (4.4 sq mi)

Population (2021)
  - Total: 396
  - Density: 34.7/km^{2} (90.0/sq mi)
- Time zone: UTC+1 (CET)
  - Summer (DST): UTC+2 (CEST)

Potnjani is a village in Croatia. It is connected by the D515 highway.

== Name ==
The name of the village in Croatian is plural.
