= Drenje, Osijek-Baranja County =

Drenje
- Municipality
- Location of Drenje in Croatia Drenje (Croatia)
- Coordinates: 45.38°N 18.28°E
- Country: Croatia
- Region: Slavonia
- County: Osijek-Baranja County

Government
  - Mayor: Slavko Dešić

Area
  - Municipality: 106.4 km^{2} (41.1 sq mi)
  - Urban: 9.9 km^{2} (3.8 sq mi)

Population (2021)
  - Municipality: 2,126
  - Density: 19.98/km^{2} (51.75/sq mi)
  - Urban: 462
  - Urban density: 47/km^{2} (120/sq mi)
- Time zone: UTC+1 (Central European Time)
- Website: drenje.hr

Drenje (Hungarian: Drenye, Serbian Cyrillic: Дрење) is a municipality in Osijek-Baranja County, Croatia.

In the 2021 census, there were a total of 2,700 inhabitants, in the following settlements:

- Borovik, population 6
- Bračevci, population 209
- Bučje Gorjansko, population 73
- Drenje, population 583
- Kućanci Đakovački, population 148
- Mandićevac, population 284
- Paljevina, population 183
- Podgorje Bračevačko, population 70
- Potnjani, population 497
- Preslatinci, population 160
- Pridvorje, population 198
- Slatinik Drenjski, population 289

In the same census, 95.7% of the population were Croats.

== Politics ==
=== Minority councils ===
Directly elected minority councils and representatives are tasked with consulting the local or regional authorities, advocating for minority rights and interests, integration into public life and participation in the management of local affairs. At the 2023 Croatian national minorities councils and representatives elections Serbs of Croatia fulfilled legal requirements to elect 10 members municipal minority councils of the Drenje Municipality but the elections were not held due to the lack of candidates.
