= Budimci =

Village in Osijek-Baranja, Croatia

- Village
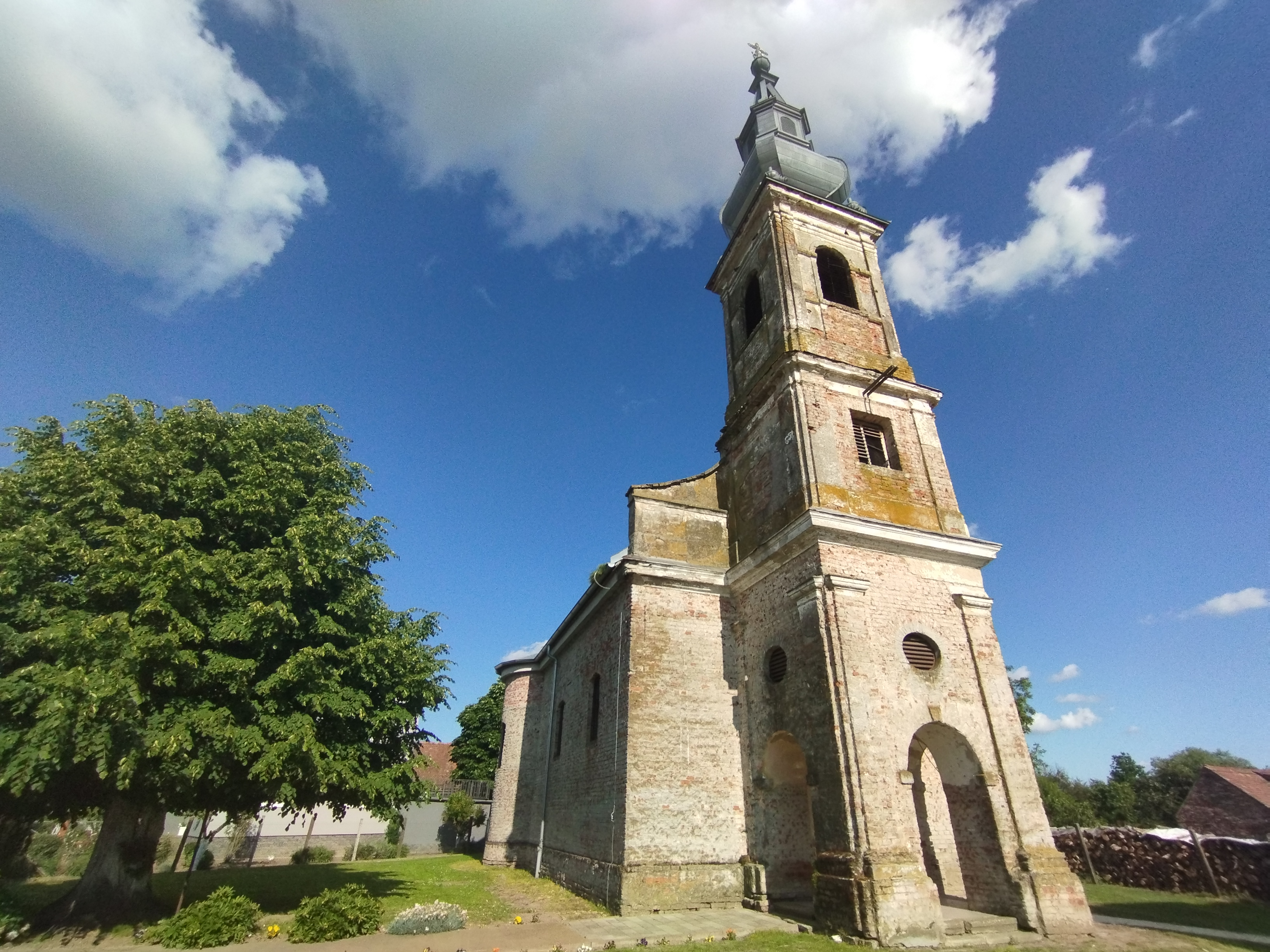
- Serbian Orthodox Church in Budimci
- Interactive map of Budimci
- Coordinates: 45°27′40″N 18°19′22″E
- Country: Croatia
- County: Osijek-Baranja County

Population (2011)
  - Total: 670

Budimci is a village (Selo) near Podgorač, Croatia. In the 2011 census, it had 670 inhabitants.
