= Podgorač =

- Municipality
- Location in Croatia Podgorač (Croatia)
- Coordinates: 45.46°N 18.22°E
- Country: Croatia
- Region: Slavonia
- County: Osijek-Baranja County

Government
  - Mayor: Goran Đanić

Area
  - Municipality: 130.8 km^{2} (50.5 sq mi)
  - Urban: 29.9 km^{2} (11.5 sq mi)

Population (2021)
  - Municipality: 2,455
  - Density: 18.77/km^{2} (48.61/sq mi)
  - Urban: 783
  - Urban density: 26.2/km^{2} (67.8/sq mi)
- Time zone: UTC+1 (Central European Time)
- Website: podgorac.hr

Podgorač (Serbian Cyrillic: Подгорач, Hungarian: Pogorács) is a municipality in Osijek-Baranja County, Croatia.

In the 2011 census, there were a total of 2,877 inhabitants in the municipality, in the following settlements:

- Bijela Loza, population 147
- Budimci, population 670
- Kelešinka, population 57
- Kršinci, population 126
- Ostrošinci, population 95
- Podgorač, population 866
- Poganovci, population 235
- Razbojište, population 283
- Stipanovci, population 398

In the same census, 81% of the population were Croats and 16.20% Serbs.

Colonist settlements of Ličani and Rudolfovac were established on the territory of the village municipality during the land reform in interwar Yugoslavia.

== Politics ==
=== Minority councils ===
Directly elected minority councils and representatives are tasked with consulting the local or regional authorities where they advocate for minority rights and interests, integration into public life and participation in the management of local affairs. At the 2023 Croatian national minorities councils and representatives elections Roma and Serbs of Croatia each fulfilled legal requirements to elect 10 members municipal minority councils of the Podgorač Municipality.

== Literature ==
- Obad Šćitaroci, Mladen; Bojanić Obad Šćitaroci, Bojana; Dundović, Boris (2013). "Manors and Gardens in Northern Croatia in the Age of Historicism" (PDF). Centropa. pp. 175–186. ISSN 1532-5563. Archived from the original (PDF) on 2025-05-05.
