= Našice =

- Town
- Grad Našice; Town of Našice
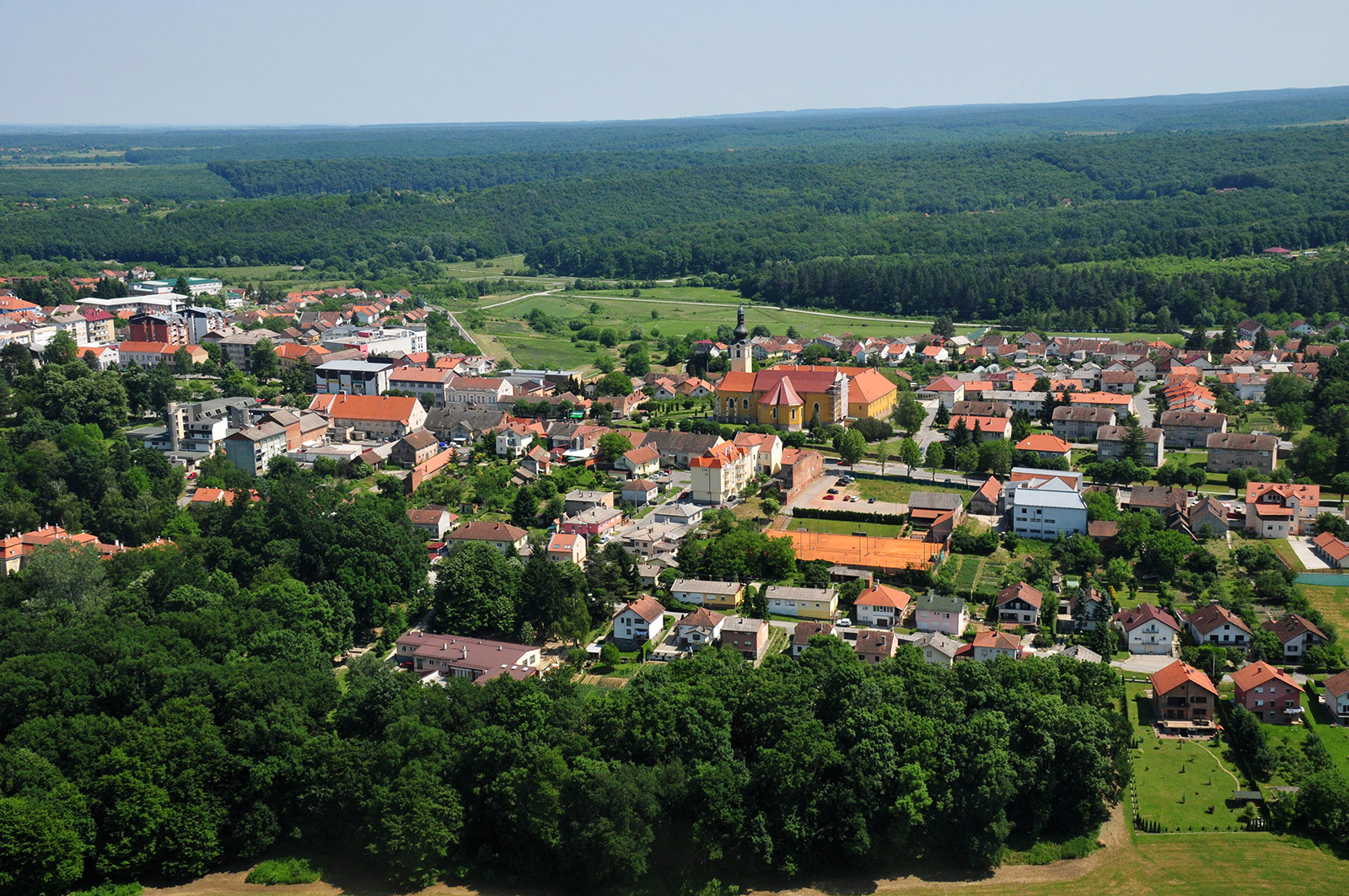
- Aerial view of Našice
- Interactive map of Našice
- Location of Našice in Croatia Našice (Croatia) Našice (Europe)
- Coordinates: 45.49°N 18.09°E
- Country: Croatia
- Region: Slavonia
- County: Osijek-Baranja County

Government
  - Mayor: Krešimir Kašuba (HDZ)

Area
  - Town: 205.2 km^{2} (79.2 sq mi)
  - Urban: 18.8 km^{2} (7.3 sq mi)

Population (2021)
  - Town: 14,291
  - Density: 69.64/km^{2} (180.4/sq mi)
  - Urban: 7,307
  - Urban density: 389/km^{2} (1,010/sq mi)
- Time zone: UTC+1 (Central European Time)
- Website: nasice.hr

Našice (pronounced [naʃitsɛ]; Slovak: Našice, Serbian Cyrillic: Нашице, Hungarian: Nekcse, German: Naschitz) is a town in eastern Croatia, located on the northern slopes of the Krndija mountain in eastern Slavonia, 51 km southwest of regional hub Osijek. Administratively it belongs to Osijek-Baranja County.

== Geography ==
Našice is located on the D2 state road Varaždin–Virovitica–Našice–Osijek and the Varaždin–Dalj railway.

== Climate ==
Since records began in 1981, the highest temperature recorded at the local weather station was 39.8 °C (103.6 °F), on 24 August 2012. The coldest temperature was −22.0 °C (−7.6 °F), on 31 January 1987.

== Economy ==
Chief occupations are farming and angling on 11 km^{2} of fishing ground. Major industries include metal processing, cement, (at Našice cement), the stone excavation. Also wood processing, textiles and food.

== History ==
The town was first mentioned in 1229 under the name of Nekche. In the 13th century, the Knights Templar came to Našice and built a church. It was conquered by Ottoman Empire in 1541 and was part of Sanjak of Pojega till Austrian conquest in 1687. In the late 19th and early 20th century, Našice was a district capital in the Virovitica County of the Kingdom of Croatia-Slavonia.

The Small Pejačević Manor in Našice employed an innovative solution to protect it from damp and ground water, being built on a trough constructed from reinforced concrete. It is built in Neoclassical Revival style.

Significant part of town was a feudal property of the Pejačević family until 1945. Count Vincencije Ljudevit Pejačević had a monumental castle built in 1812. With the arrival of communism in Eastern and Central Europe, the family was expropriated and exiled. With the return of democracy, family properties were returned partially to its members.

The DVD "Papuk Našice" was founded in 1986, and the DVD "Našicement" in 1990.

In September 1991 Croatian forces in Našice captured military barracks of Yugoslav People's Army.

== Population ==
Historical populations of Našice
Year	Pop.	±%
1880	4,035	—
1890	6,259	+55.1%
1900	7,992	+27.7%
1910	9,238	+15.6%
1921	9,244	+0.1%
1931	10,810	+16.9%
1948	12,736	+17.8%
1953	13,616	+6.9%
1961	14,665	+7.7%
1971	15,366	+4.8%
1981	15,629	+1.7%
1991	17,432	+11.5%
2001	17,320	−0.6%
2011	16,224	−6.3%
2021	14,336	−11.6%
Source: Naselja i stanovništvo Republike Hrvatske 1857–2001, DZS, Zagreb, 2005

According to the census of 2011, there were 7,888 inhabitants in town, with 16,224 in the administrative area. 88% of the population comprised Croats.

Town of Našice: Population trends 1857–2021
v

population	3076	3746	4035	6259	7992	9238	9244	10810	12736	13616	14665	15366	15629	17432	17320	16224	14291
	1857	1869	1880	1890	1900	1910	1921	1931	1948	1953	1961	1971	1981	1991	2001	2011	2021

Sources: Croatian Bureau of Statistics publications

== Politics ==
=== Minority councils ===
Although though the Government of the Republic of Croatia does not guarantee official Croatian-Slovak bilinguialism, the statute of Našice itself does. Preserving traditional Slovak place names and assigning street names to Slovak historical figures is legally mandated and carried out.

Directly elected minority councils and representatives are tasked with consulting the local or regional authorities, advocating for minority rights and interests, integration into public life and participation in the management of local affairs. At the 2023 Croatian national minorities councils and representatives elections Slovaks and Serbs of Croatia each fulfilled legal requirements to elect 15 members minority councils of the Town of Našice.

== Settlements ==
The municipality of Našice includes the following settlements:

- Brezik Našički, population 352
- Ceremošnjak, population 108
- Crna Klada, uninhabited
- Gradac Našički, population 153
- Granice, population 109
- Jelisavac, population 1,265
- Lađanska, population 302
- Lila, population 195
- Londžica, population 190
- Makloševac, population 130
- Markovac Našički, population 1,586
- Martin, population 1,077
- Našice, population 7,888
- Polubaše, population 17
- Ribnjak, population 51
- Rozmajerovac, population 25
- Velimirovac, population 1,129
- Vukojevci, population 928
- Zoljan, population 733

Colonist settlements of Brezik Našički, Makloševac, and Šalapanka were established on the territory of the village municipality during the land reform in interwar Yugoslavia.

== Culture ==
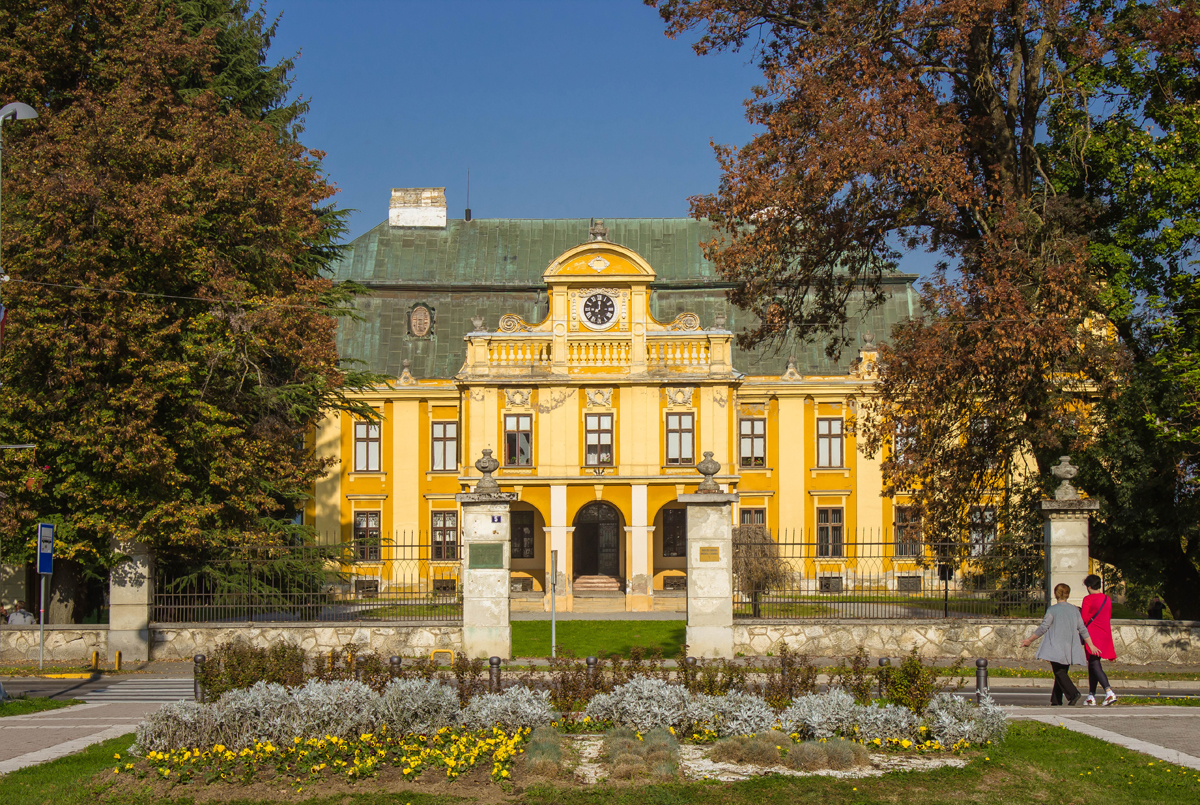
Pejačević Castle

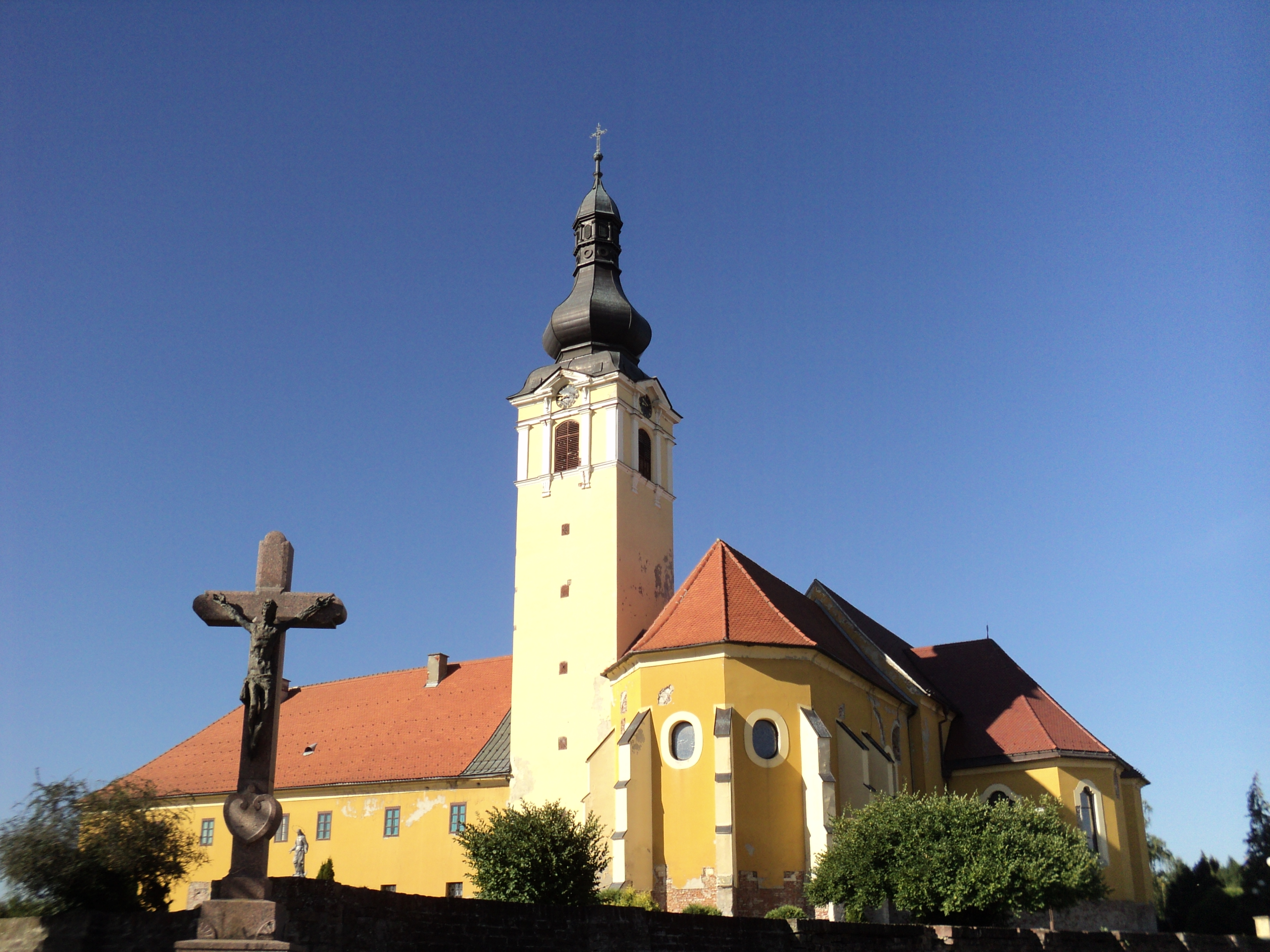
Church of Saint Anthony of Padua

Hunting grounds can be found in the immediate surroundings, and the fishpond Našička Breznica and Lake Lapovac offer angling opportunities. Slavonian cuisine and freshwater fish are a part of the gastronomic offerings of the town and its surroundings.

As an economic and cultural centre, the area is known for its cultural and historical heritage, (the Gothic church, two manor houses, exhibitions of the art colony "Hinko Juhn"). Našice plays a role in business and excursionist tourism. The park by both of the Pejačević manors (horticultural monument). The private zoo of the Bizik family in nearby in Markovac Našički as well as the surroundings at the foot of the Krndija hill emphasize the importance of natural environment.

The town has an official memorial-area Crni Potok, dedicated to Croatian quisling soldiers and civilians killed at the site by members of the Yugoslav Partisans. The site is commemorated annually on the third Saturday in June.

== Sports ==
Sports opportunities comprise tennis court, a football ground with accompanying facilities, and boating on the local waters. Footballers from Našice include AEK Athens defender Domagoj Vida midfielder Danijel Pranjić and Danijel Stojanović. Football club NK NAŠK plays in Croatian Third Football League. Našice is proudest of its handball team RK Nexe. Currently, RK Nexe competes in the Premijer liga and the Croatian Handball Cup as well in the SEHA League and in the EHF Cup.

The local chapter of the HPS, HPD "Petrov Vrh", was founded in mid-1936. Membership rose to 18 in 1937 under president Petar Rohr.
