= Electoral district IV (Croatian Parliament) =

- Constituency for the Croatian Parliament
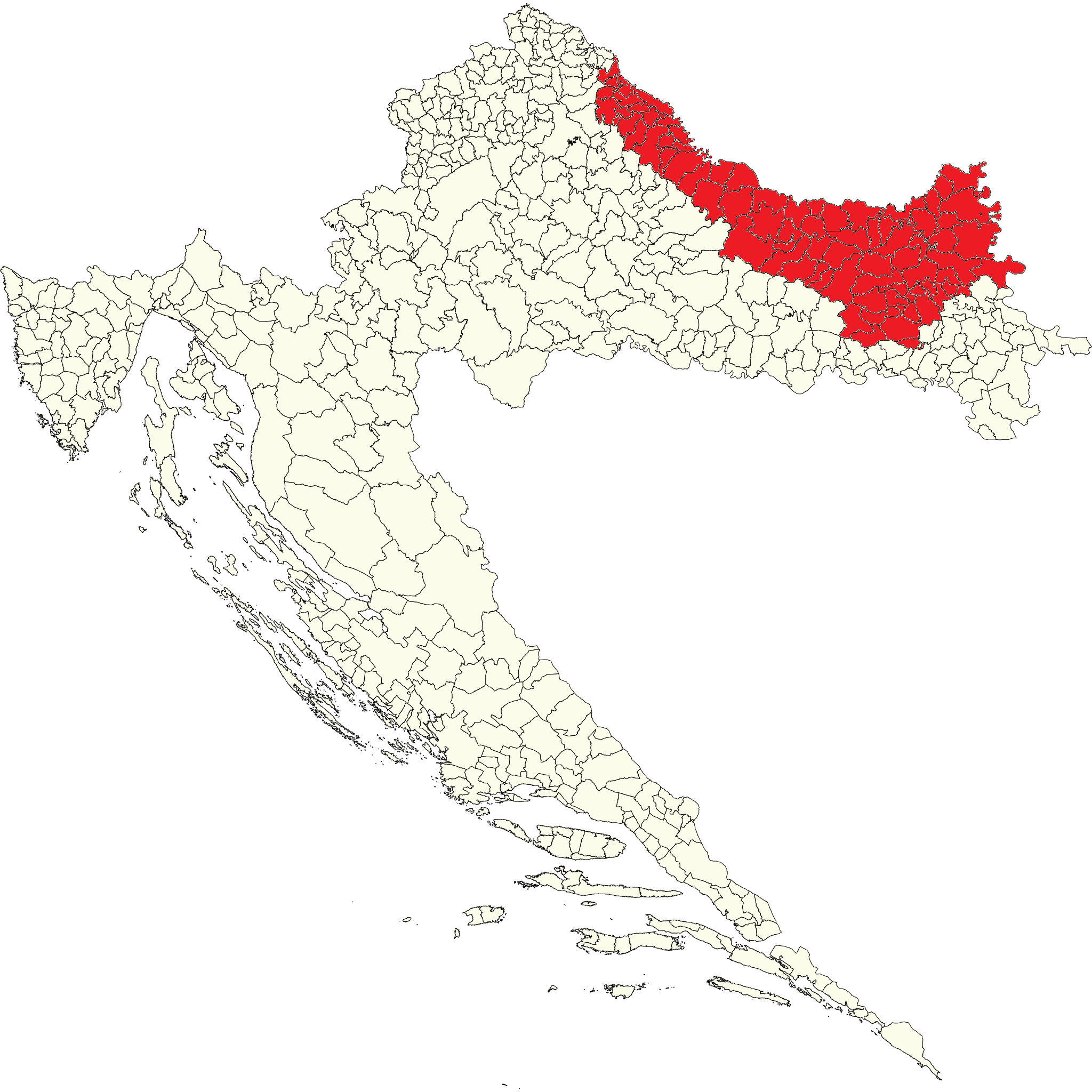
- Map of Electoral district IV (2023-present)
- Electorate: 363,534 (2025)
- Major settlements: Osijek, Đakovo, Našice, Virovitica, Slatina, Koprivnica

Current constituency
- Created: 2023
- Number of members: 14

Electoral district IV (Croatian: IV. izborna jedinica) is one of twelve electoral districts of the Croatian Parliament. In 2025, the district had 363,534 registered voters.

== Boundaries ==
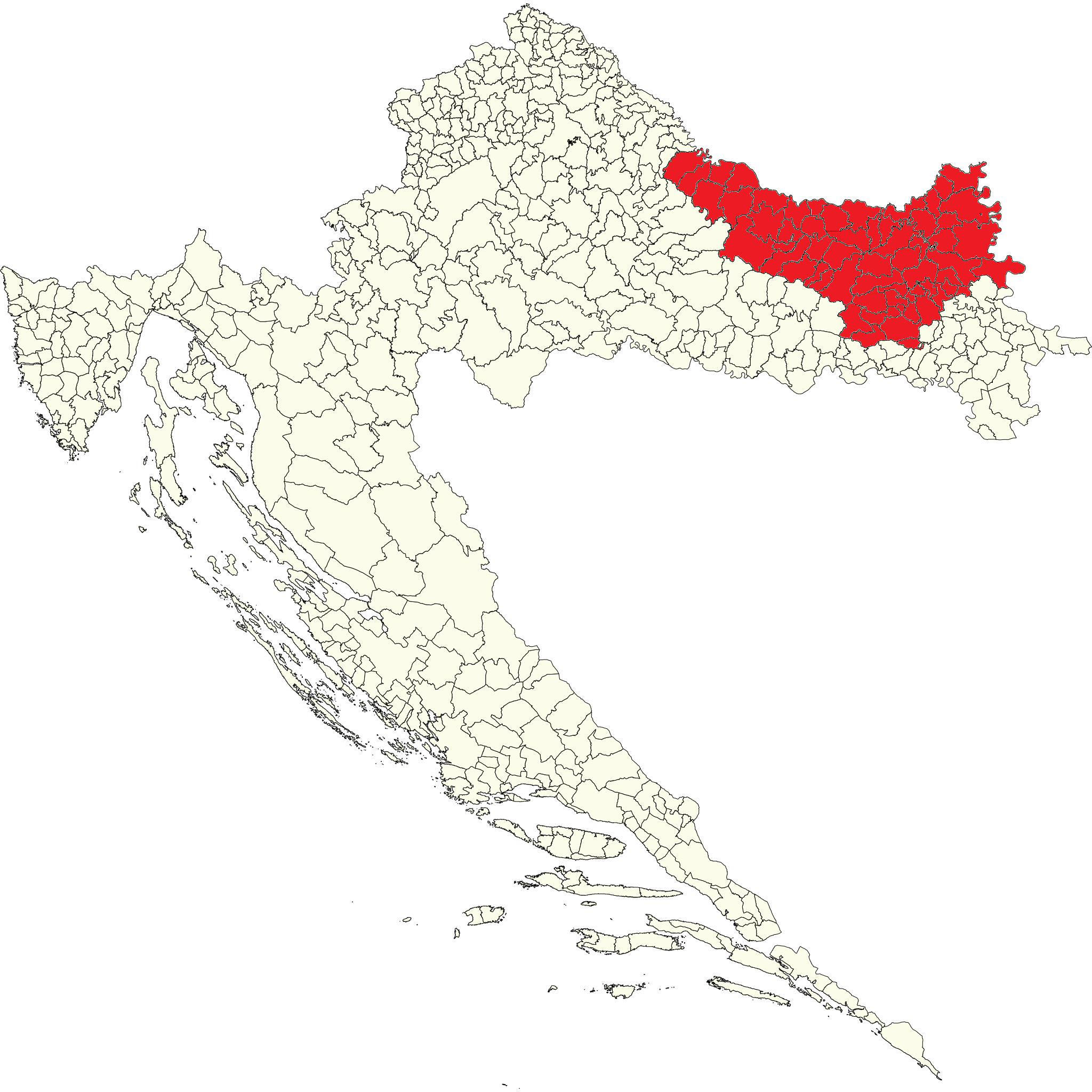
Electoral district IV (1999-2023)

=== Creation ===
Electoral district IV consisted of:

- The whole Virovitica-Podravina County;
- The whole Osijek-Baranja County.

=== 2023 revision ===
Under the 2023 revision, district boundaries were redrawn according to the suggestion of the Constitutional Court to compel a proportional number of voters.

The new district consists of:

- The whole Osijek-Baranja County
- The whole Virovitica-Podravina County
- The northern and eastern part of Koprivnica-Križevci County:
  - cities and municipalities: Đurđevac, Koprivnica, Drnje, Đelekovec, Ferdinandovac, Gola, Hlebine, Kalinovac, Kloštar Podravski, Koprivnički Bregi, Koprivnički Ivanec, Legrad, Molve, Novigrad Podravski, Novo Virje, Peteranec, Podravske Sesvete and Virje

== Representatives ==
The current representatives of the fourth electoral district in the Croatian Parliament are:

| Name | Party | Deputizing |
|---|---|---|
| Vesna Bedeković | HDZ | Igor Andrović |
| Josip Đakić | HDZ | |
| Marin Mandarić | HDZ | Ivan Anušić |
| Ivan Radić | HDZ | |
| Darko Sobota | HDZ | |
| Stipan Šašlin | HDZ | Goran Ivanović |
| Ivo Zelić | HDZ | Nataša Tramišak |
| Sanja Bježančević | SDP | |
| Mišel Jakšić | SDP | |
| Boris Piližota | SDP | |
| Mate Vukušić | SDP | Biljana Borzan |
| Krešimir Čabaj | DOMiNO | Mario Radić |
| Željko Lacković | The Independents | |
| Vesna Vučemilović | Independent | |

== Elections ==
=== 2000 Elections ===
| Party | Votes | % | Seats |
|---|---|---|---|
| HSLS - SDP - SBHS | 98.084 | 38.04 | 7 |
| HDZ | 61.957 | 24.03 | 4 |
| HSS - LS - HNS | 37.522 | 14.55 | 2 |
| HSP - HKDU | 21.109 | 8.19 | 1 |
| others | 39.205 | 15.19 | 0 |
| Total | 257.877 | 100 | 14 |
| Valid votes | 257.877 | 98.22 | |
| Invalid/blank votes | 4.675 | 1.78 | |
| Total votes | 262.552 | 78.67 | |
| Registered voters/turnout | 333.735 | | |
Source: Results Archived 2022-11-18 at the Wayback Machine

HSLS - SDP - SBHS

- Vilim Herman
- Antun Vujić
- Željko Malević
- Damir Jurić
- Viktor Brož
- Sanja Kapetanović
- Dragutin Vukušić

HDZ

- Vladimir Šeks
- Branimir Glavaš
- Đuro Dečak
- Berislav Šmit

HSS - LS - HNS

- Zlatko Kramarić
- Željko Pecek

HSP - HKDU

- Anto Đapić

=== 2003 Elections ===
| Party | Votes | % | Seats | +/- |
|---|---|---|---|---|
| HDZ | 74.900 | 35.72 | 7 | +3 |
| SDP - LS - LIBRA | 38.508 | 18.37 | 3 | -3 |
| HSP | 18.972 | 9.05 | 1 | 0 |
| HSS | 17.820 | 8.50 | 1 | 0 |
| HNS - SBHS | 13.561 | 6.47 | 1 | -1 |
| HSU | 11.895 | 5.67 | 1 | +1 |
| others | 34.014 | 16.22 | 0 | 0 |
| Total | 209.670 | 100 | 14 | 0 |
| Valid votes | 209.670 | 97.58 | | |
| Invalid/blank votes | 5.189 | 2.42 | | |
| Total votes | 214.859 | 65.49 | | |
| Registered voters/turnout | 328.076 | | | |
Source: Results Archived 2022-11-18 at the Wayback Machine

HDZ
- Vladimir Šeks
- Branimir Glavaš
- Mato Štimac
- Ivica Buconjić
- Vladimir Šišljagić
- Ivan Drmić
- Josip Đakić

SDP - LS - LIBRA

- Željka Antunović
- Zlatko Kramarić
- Vilim Herman

HSP

- Anto Đapić

HSS

- Željko Pecek

HNS - SBHS

- Antun Kapraljević

HSU

- Dragutin Pukleš

=== 2007 Elections ===
| Party | Votes | % | Seats | +/- |
|---|---|---|---|---|
| HDZ | 65.115 | 31.20 | 6 | -1 |
| SDP | 55.936 | 26.80 | 5 | +2 |
| HDSSB | 31.795 | 15.23 | 2 | +2 |
| HSP | 16.656 | 7.98 | 1 | 0 |
| others | 39.214 | 18.79 | 0 | -3 |
| Total | 208.716 | 100 | 14 | 0 |
| Valid votes | 208.716 | 98.72 | | |
| Invalid/blank votes | 2.710 | 1.28 | | |
| Total votes | 211.426 | 63.10 | | |
| Registered voters/turnout | 335.091 | | | |
Source: Results Archived 2022-11-18 at the Wayback Machine

HDZ

- Vladimir Šeks
- Tomislav Ivić
- Josip Đakić
- Dragan Kovačević
- Miroslav Škoro
- Ivica Buconjić

SDP

- Biljana Borzan
- Zoran Vinković
- Nada Čavlović Smiljanec
- Dragutin Bodakoš
- Vlatko Podnar

HDSSB

- Branimir Glavaš
- Vladimir Šišljagić

HSP

- Anto Đapić

=== 2011 Elections ===
| Party | Votes | % | Seats | +/- |
|---|---|---|---|---|
| SDP - HNS - IDS - HSU | 68.188 | 33.06 | 6 | +1 |
| HDZ | 48.377 | 23.45 | 4 | -2 |
| HDSSB | 44.687 | 21.66 | 4 | +2 |
| others | 45.026 | 21.83 | 0 | -1 |
| Total | 206.278 | 100 | 14 | 0 |
| Valid votes | 206.278 | 98.52 | | |
| Invalid/blank votes | 3.109 | 1.48 | | |
| Total votes | 209.387 | 62.70 | | |
| Registered voters/turnout | 333.927 | | | |
Source: Results Archived 2022-11-18 at the Wayback Machine

SDP

- Biljana Borzan
- Nada Čavlović Smiljanec
- Domagoj Hajduković
- Višnja Fortuna
- Damir Tomić
- Tomislav Žagar

HDZ

- Vladimir Šeks
- Tomislav Ivić
- Josip Đakić
- Josip Salapić

HDSSB

- Vladimir Šišljagić
- Krešimir Bubalo
- Dinko Burić
- Ivan Drmić

=== 2015 Elections ===
| Party | Votes | % | Seats | +/- |
|---|---|---|---|---|
| HDZ - HSS - HSP AS - BUZ - HSLS - HRAST - HDS - ZDS | 67.805 | 36.00 | 6 | +2 |
| SDP - HNS - HSU - HL SR - A-HSS - ZS | 55.077 | 29.24 | 5 | -1 |
| HDSSB | 21.849 | 11.60 | 2 | -2 |
| Most | 20.156 | 10.70 | 1 | +1 |
| others | 23.481 | 12.46 | 0 | 0 |
| Total | 188.368 | 100 | 14 | 0 |
| Valid votes | 188.368 | 98.12 | | |
| Invalid/blank votes | 3.606 | 1.88 | | |
| Total votes | 191.974 | 63.32 | | |
| Registered voters/turnout | 303.173 | | | |
Source: Results Archived 2022-11-18 at the Wayback Machine

HDZ - HSS - HSP AS - BUZ - HSLS - HRAST - HDS - ZDS

- Milijan Brkić
- Tomislav Tolušić
- Ivan Anušić
- Ivan Tepeš
- Josip Đakić
- Ivan Radić

SDP - HNS - HSU - HL SR - A-HSS - ZS

- Ivan Vrdoljak
- Domagoj Hajduković
- Jaroslav Pecnik
- Tomislav Žagar
- Damir Tomić

HDSSB

- Branimir Glavaš
- Vladimir Šišljagić

Most

- Miroslav Šimić

=== 2016 Elections ===
| Party | Votes | % | Seats | +/- |
|---|---|---|---|---|
| HDZ | 60.380 | 38.26 | 6 | 0 |
| SDP - HNS - HSS - HSU | 46.694 | 29.59 | 5 | 0 |
| HDSSB - HKS | 15.540 | 9.84 | 1 | -1 |
| Most | 13.346 | 8.45 | 1 | 0 |
| ŽZ - PH - AM - Abeceda | 11.311 | 7.16 | 1 | +1 |
| others | 10.526 | 6.70 | 0 | 0 |
| Total | 157.797 | 100 | 14 | 0 |
| Valid votes | 157.797 | 97.96 | | |
| Invalid/blank votes | 3.293 | 2.04 | | |
| Total votes | 161.090 | 53.86 | | |
| Registered voters/turnout | 299.067 | | | |
Source: Results Archived 2022-11-18 at the Wayback Machine

HDZ

- Tomislav Tolušić
- Miroslav Tuđman
- Ivan Anušić
- Vlatko Kopić
- Josip Đakić
- Irena Petrijevčanin Vuksanović

SDP - HNS - HSS - HSU

- Ivan Vrdoljak
- Domagoj Hajduković
- Ana-Marija Petin
- Tomislav Žagar
- Damir Tomić

HDSSB - HKS

- Branimir Glavaš

Most

- Miroslav Šimić

ŽZ - PH - AM - Abeceda

- Hrvoje Runtić

=== 2020 Elections ===
| Party | Votes | % | Seats | +/- |
|---|---|---|---|---|
| HDZ | 61.204 | 44.03 | 8 | +2 |
| SDP - HSS - HSU - SNAGA - GLAS - IDS - PGS | 28.479 | 20.48 | 3 | -2 |
| DP - HS - BLOK - HKS - HRAST - SU - ZL | 23.020 | 16.56 | 3 | +3 |
| others | 26.290 | 18.93 | 0 | -3 |
| Total | 138.993 | 100 | 14 | 0 |
| Valid votes | 138.993 | 97.64 | | |
| Invalid/blank votes | 3.365 | 2.36 | | |
| Total votes | 142.358 | 45.54 | | |
| Registered voters/turnout | 312.592 | | | |
Source: Results

HDZ

- Ivan Anušić
- Josip Đakić
- Ivan Radić
- Nataša Tramišak
- Marko Pavić
- Vesna Bedeković
- Josip Škorić
- Hrvoje Šimić

SDP - HNS - HSS - HSU

- Sabina Glasovac
- Domagoj Hajduković
- Romana Nikolić

DP - HS - BLOK - HKS - HRAST - SU - ZL

- Vesna Vučemilović
- Krešimir Bubalo
- Mario Radić

=== 2024 Elections ===
| Party | Votes | % | Seats | +/- |
|---|---|---|---|---|
| HDZ - HSLS - HDS - HNS - HSU | 84.712 | 41.81 | 7 | -1 |
| SDP - Centar - HSS - DO i SIP - NS R - GLAS | 51.065 | 25.20 | 4 | +1 |
| DP - PiP - DHSS - ZL | 26.478 | 13.07 | 2 | -1 |
| Most - HS - HKS - NLM | 12.249 | 6.04 | 1 | +1 |
| Možemo - HP | 11.133 | 5.49 | 0 | 0 |
| others | 26.290 | 18.93 | 0 | 0 |
| Total | 138.993 | 100 | 14 | 0 |
| Valid votes | 202.567 | 97.16 | | |
| Invalid/blank votes | 5.914 | 2.84 | | |
| Total votes | 208.481 | 59.25 | | |
| Registered voters/turnout | 351.860 | | | |
Source: Results

HDZ - HSLS - HDS - HNS - HSU

- Ivan Anušić
- Igor Andrović
- Darko Sobota
- Ivan Radić
- Nataša Tramišak
- Goran Ivanović
- Josip Đakić

SDP - Centar - HSS - DO i SIP - NS R - GLAS

- Mišel Jakšić
- Sabina Glasovac
- Sanja Bježančević
- Boris Piližota

DP - PiP - DHSS - ZL

- Mario Radić
- Željko Lacković

Most - HS - HKS - NLM

- Vesna Vučemilović
