= List of prefects of Osijek-Baranja County =

This is a list of prefects of Osijek-Baranja County.

== Prefects of Osijek-Baranja County (1993–present) ==
Croatian Democratic Union (HDZ)
Social Democratic Party of Croatia (SDP)
Independent List of Branimir Glavaš (NLBG) / Croatian Democratic Alliance of Slavonia and Baranja (HDSSB)

No.	Portrait	Name (Born–Died)	Term of Office		Party
1		Branimir Glavaš (1956–)	4 May 1993	27 September 1997	HDZ
2		Anica Horvat (1936–)	27 September 1997	9 July 1998	Non-partisan
3		Srećko Lovrinčević (1950–)	9 July 1998	15 March 1999	HDZ
(1)		Branimir Glavaš (1956–)	15 March 1999	23 July 2000	HDZ
4		Marko Bagarić (1961–)	23 July 2000	12 July 2001	HDZ
5		Ladislav Bognar (1942–)	12 July 2001	27 February 2003	SDP
6		Zdravko Bosančić (1957–)	27 February 2003	14 February 2004	SDP
6		Krešimir Bubalo (1973–)	14 February 2004	4 June 2009	NLBG from 2006; HDSSB
7		Vladimir Šišljagić (1957–)	4 June 2009	12 June 2017	HDSSB
8		Ivan Anušić (1973–)	12 June 2017	15 November 2023	HDZ
9		Mato Lukic (Unknown-)	15 November 2023	26 May 2025	HDZ
10		Nataša Tramišak (1982-)	26 May 2025	Incumbent	HDZ

== See also ==
- Osijek-Baranja County
