= Blaž Lenger =

- Born: December 6, 1919; Draganci, present-day Koprivnica-Križevci County, Croatia
- Died: September 26, 2006 (aged 86) Draganci, Koprivnica-Križevci County, Croatia
- Genre: Folk
- Years active: 1965–2006

Blaž Lenger (December 6, 1919 - September 26, 2006) was a Croatian performer of traditional folk songs from northern Croatia, especially the region of Podravina.

== Biography and career ==
He was born in the village of Draganci (municipality Podravske Sesvete), where he attended elementary school. From early childhood he was oriented towards music thanks to his parents' influence; soon he started performing with the local musical group "Vlašički". The first instrument he played was the accordion but he soon switched to bass (bajs), a rhythm instrument that matched his strong voice. Later he joined the Štef Ivančan music group in Novo Virje, where he gained enough experience to form his own group. His new group was named after him: "Lengeri". The group performed at music festivals, on radio and television, and recorded cassettes and records. Their first recorded song was "Podravino moja mila" ('My dear Podravina'), followed by "Potočić maleni", "Alaj je divan taj podravski kraj" and a polka "Ruža, ruža".

Lenger retired in 1977 but never stopped singing. He was a member to the day he died of a singing group from Podravske Sesvete named after him. He died on September 26, 2006, at home in Draganci, and was buried in the village cemetery in Podravske Sesvete.

== Remembrance ==
Pjevačka udruga Blaž Lenger ('Blaž Lenger Singing Society') in Podravske Sesvete was named after him.

In 2022, statue of Lenger was erected in Draganci, work of Krunoslav Posavec.
