= Glogovac, Croatia =

Settlement in Koprivnica-Križevci County, Croatia

Glogovac
- Settlement
- Interactive map of Glogovac
- Location of Glogovac in Croatia
- Coordinates: 46°06′56″N 16°52′27″E
- Country: Croatia
- County: Koprivnica-Križevci
- Municipality: Koprivnički Bregi

Area
  - Total: 9.3 km^{2} (3.6 sq mi)

Population (2021)
  - Total: 764
  - Density: 82/km^{2} (210/sq mi)
- Time zone: UTC+1 (CET)
  - Summer (DST): UTC+2 (CEST)
- Postal code: 48000 Koprivnica
- Area code: +385 (0)48

Glogovac is a settlement in the Municipality of Koprivnički Bregi in Croatia. In 2021, its population was 764.

== Demographics ==
Glogovac: Population trends 1857–2021
v

population	202	213	284	310	336	399	415	706	791	968	1082	1037	899	804	915	924	764
	1857	1869	1880	1890	1900	1910	1921	1931	1948	1953	1961	1971	1981	1991	2001	2011	2021

Sources: Croatian Bureau of Statistics publications
