= Duga Rijeka =

Coordinates: 46°11′N 16°35′E

- Village
- Interactive map of Duga Rijeka
- Country: Croatia
- County: Koprivnica-Križevci County
- Municipality: Rasinja

Area
  - Total: 7.0 km^{2} (2.7 sq mi)

Population (2021)
  - Total: 132
  - Density: 19/km^{2} (49/sq mi)
- Time zone: UTC+1 (CET)
  - Summer (DST): UTC+2 (CEST)

Duga Rijeka is a village in Croatia.
