= Imbriovec =

- Village
- Location of Imbriovec in Croatia
- Coordinates: 46°15′0″N 16°49′12″E
- Country: Croatia
- County: Koprivnica-Križevci
- Municipality: Đelekovec

Area
  - Total: 8.7 km^{2} (3.4 sq mi)

Population (2021)
  - Total: 291
  - Density: 33/km^{2} (87/sq mi)
- Time zone: UTC+1 (CET)
  - Summer (DST): UTC+2 (CEST)
- Postal code: 48316 Đelekovec
- Area code: +385 (0)48

Imbriovec is a village in Croatia.
