= Delovi =

Coordinates: 46°06′36″N 16°57′39″E

- Village
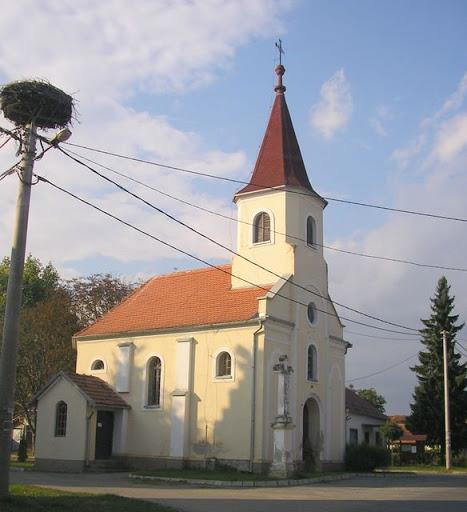
- Church in Delovi
- Interactive map of Delovi
- Country: Croatia
- County: Koprivnica-Križevci County
- Municipality: Novigrad Podravski

Area
  - Total: 10.7 km^{2} (4.1 sq mi)

Population (2021)
  - Total: 169
  - Density: 15.8/km^{2} (40.9/sq mi)
- Time zone: UTC+1 (CET)
  - Summer (DST): UTC+2 (CEST)

Delovi is a village in Croatia. It is connected by the D2 highway.
