= Cvetkovec =

- Village
- Location within Croatia
- Coordinates: 46°12′N 16°42′E
- Country: Croatia
- County: Koprivnica-Križevci County
- Municipality: Rasinja

Area
  - Total: 5.3 km^{2} (2.0 sq mi)

Population (2021)
  - Total: 154
  - Density: 29/km^{2} (75/sq mi)
- Time zone: UTC+1 (CET)
  - Summer (DST): UTC+2 (CEST)

Cvetkovec is a village in Croatia. It is connected by the D2 highway.
