= Municipalities of Croatia =

Second-level administrative subdivision in Croatia

Map of towns and municipalities of Croatia (as of 2019)

Municipalities in Croatia (Croatian: općina; plural: općine) are the second-lowest administrative unit of government in the country, and along with cities and towns (grad, plural: gradovi) they form the second level of administrative subdisivion, after counties. Each municipality consists of one or more settlements (naselja), which are the third-level spatial units of Croatia.

Though equal in powers and administrative bodies, municipalities and towns differ in that municipalities are usually more likely to consist of a collection of villages in rural or suburban areas, whereas towns are more likely to cover urbanised areas. Croatian law defines municipalities as local self-government units which are established, in an area where several inhabited settlements represent a natural, economic and social entity, related to one other by the common interests of the area's population.

As of 2023, the 21 counties of Croatia are subdivided into 128 towns and 428 municipalities, which in turn are subdivided into 6757 settlements.

== Tasks and organization ==
Municipalities, within their self-governing scope of activities, perform the tasks of local significance, which directly fulfil the citizens’ needs, and which were not assigned to the state bodies by the constitution or law, and in particular affairs related to the organization of localities and housing, zoning and planning, public utilities, child care, social welfare, primary health services, education and primary schools, culture, physical education and sports, customer protection, protection and improvement of the environment, fire protection and civil defence, and local transport.

=== Municipality government ===
Municipal council (općinsko vijeće) is the representative body of citizens and the body of local self-government. The councillors are elected for a four-year term on the basis of universal suffrage in direct elections by secret ballot using proportional system with the D'Hondt method. The executive head of the municipality is the municipality president (općinski načelnik), also elected in direct elections for a four-year term, by majority vote (two-round system) (the deputy president is elected together with the president). They (with the deputy president) can be recalled by a referendum. Municipalities have administrative departments as offices of municipal administration (in small municipalities there is unique administrative department) chaired by the heads (principals). They are appointed by the municipal president on the basis of a public competition.

Croatian municipalities are administratively subdivided into "local committee areas" (mjesni odbori) with elected councils.

== List of municipalities ==
As of 2015, there are 428 municipalities in Croatia.

=== Continental Croatia ===
==== Koprivnica-Križevci County ====
- Drnje
- Đelekovec
- Ferdinandovac
- Gola
- Gornja Rijeka
- Hlebine
- Kalinovac
- Kalnik
- Kloštar Podravski
- Koprivnički Bregi
- Koprivnički Ivanec
- Legrad
- Molve
- Novigrad Podravski
- Novo Virje
- Peteranec
- Podravske Sesvete
- Rasinja
- Sokolovac
- Sveti Ivan Žabno
- Sveti Petar Orehovec
- Virje

==== Krapina-Zagorje County ====
- Bedekovčina
- Budinščina
- Desinić
- Đurmanec
- Gornja Stubica
- Hrašćina
- Hum na Sutli
- Jesenje
- Konjščina
- Kraljevec na Sutli
- Krapinske Toplice
- Kumrovec
- Lobor
- Mače
- Marija Bistrica
- Mihovljan
- Novi Golubovec
- Petrovsko
- Radoboj
- Stubičke Toplice
- Sveti Križ Začretje
- Tuhelj
- Veliko Trgovišće
- Zagorska Sela
- Zlatar-Bistrica

==== Međimurje County ====
- Belica
- Dekanovec
- Domašinec
- Donja Dubrava
- Donji Kraljevec
- Donji Vidovec
- Goričan
- Gornji Mihaljevec
- Kotoriba
- Mala Subotica
- Nedelišće
- Orehovica
- Podturen
- Pribislavec
- Selnica
- Strahoninec
- Sveta Marija
- Sveti Juraj na Bregu
- Sveti Martin na Muri
- Šenkovec
- Štrigova
- Vratišinec

==== Varaždin County ====
- Bednja
- Beretinec
- Breznica
- Breznički Hum
- Cestica
- Donja Voća
- Gornji Kneginec
- Jalžabet
- Klenovnik
- Ljubešćica
- Mali Bukovec
- Martijanec
- Maruševec
- Petrijanec
- Sračinec
- Sveti Đurđ
- Sveti Ilija
- Trnovec Bartolovečki
- Veliki Bukovec
- Vidovec
- Vinica
- Visoko

==== Zagreb County ====
- Bedenica
- Bistra
- Brckovljani
- Brdovec
- Dubrava
- Dubravica
- Farkaševac
- Gradec
- Jakovlje
- Klinča Sela
- Kloštar Ivanić
- Krašić
- Kravarsko
- Križ
- Luka
- Marija Gorica
- Orle
- Pisarovina
- Pokupsko
- Preseka
- Pušća
- Rakovec
- Rugvica
- Stupnik
- Žumberak

==== Bjelovar-Bilogora County ====
- Berek
- Dežanovac
- Đulovac
- Hercegovac
- Ivanska
- Kapela
- Končanica
- Nova Rača
- Rovišće
- Severin
- Sirač
- Šandrovac
- Štefanje
- Velika Pisanica
- Velika Trnovitica
- Veliki Grđevac
- Veliko Trojstvo
- Zrinski Topolovac

==== Brod-Posavina County ====
- Bebrina
- Brodski Stupnik
- Bukovlje
- Cernik
- Davor
- Donji Andrijevci
- Dragalić
- Garčin
- Gornja Vrba
- Gornji Bogićevci
- Gundinci
- Klakar
- Nova Kapela
- Okučani
- Oprisavci
- Oriovac
- Podcrkavlje
- Rešetari
- Sibinj
- Sikirevci
- Slavonski Šamac
- Stara Gradiška
- Staro Petrovo Selo
- Velika Kopanica
- Vrbje
- Vrpolje

==== Karlovac County ====
- Barilović
- Bosiljevo
- Cetingrad
- Draganić
- Generalski Stol
- Josipdol
- Kamanje
- Krnjak
- Lasinja
- Netretić
- Plaški
- Rakovica
- Ribnik
- Saborsko
- Tounj
- Vojnić
- Žakanje

==== Osijek-Baranja County ====
- Antunovac
- Bilje
- Bizovac
- Čeminac
- Čepin
- Darda
- Donja Motičina
- Draž
- Drenje
- Đurđenovac
- Erdut
- Ernestinovo
- Feričanci
- Gorjani
- Jagodnjak
- Kneževi Vinogradi
- Koška
- Levanjska Varoš
- Magadenovac
- Marijanci
- Petlovac
- Petrijevci
- Podravska Moslavina
- Podgorač
- Popovac
- Punitovci
- Satnica Đakovačka
- Semeljci
- Strizivojna
- Šodolovci
- Trnava
- Viljevo
- Viškovci
- Vladislavci
- Vuka

==== Požega-Slavonia County ====
- Brestovac
- Čaglin
- Jakšić
- Kaptol
- Velika

==== Sisak-Moslavina County ====
- Donji Kukuruzari
- Dvor
- Gvozd
- Hrvatska Dubica
- Jasenovac
- Lekenik
- Lipovljani
- Majur
- Martinska Ves
- Sunja
- Topusko
- Velika Ludina

==== Virovitica-Podravina County ====
- Crnac
- Čačinci
- Čađavica
- Gradina
- Lukač
- Mikleuš
- Nova Bukovica
- Pitomača
- Sopje
- Suhopolje
- Špišić Bukovica
- Voćin
- Zdenci

==== Vukovar-Srijem County ====
- Andrijaševci
- Babina Greda
- Bogdanovci
- Borovo
- Bošnjaci
- Cerna
- Drenovci
- Gradište
- Gunja
- Ivankovo
- Jarmina
- Lovas
- Markušica
- Negoslavci
- Nijemci
- Nuštar
- Privlaka
- Stari Jankovci
- Stari Mikanovci
- Štitar
- Tompojevci
- Tordinci
- Tovarnik
- Trpinja
- Vođinci
- Vrbanja

=== Adriatic Croatia ===
==== Dubrovnik-Neretva County ====
- Blato
- Dubrovačko Primorje
- Janjina
- Konavle
- Kula Norinska
- Lastovo
- Lumbarda
- Mljet
- Orebić
- Pojezerje
- Slivno
- Smokvica
- Ston
- Trpanj
- Vela Luka
- Zažablje
- Župa Dubrovačka

==== Istria County ====
- Bale
- Barban
- Brtonigla
- Cerovlje
- Fažana
- Funtana
- Gračišće
- Grožnjan
- Kanfanar
- Karojba
- Kaštelir-Labinci
- Kršan
- Lanišće
- Ližnjan
- Lupoglav
- Marčana
- Medulin
- Motovun
- Oprtalj
- Pićan
- Raša
- Sveta Nedelja
- Sveti Lovreč
- Sveti Petar u Šumi
- Svetvinčenat
- Tar-Vabriga
- Tinjan
- Višnjan
- Vižinada
- Vrsar
- Žminj

==== Lika-Senj County ====
- Brinje
- Donji Lapac
- Karlobag
- Lovinac
- Perušić
- Plitvička Jezera
- Udbina
- Vrhovine

==== Primorje-Gorski Kotar County ====
- Baška
- Brod Moravice
- Čavle
- Dobrinj
- Fužine
- Jelenje
- Klana
- Kostrena
- Lokve
- Lopar
- Lovran
- Malinska-Dubašnica
- Matulji
- Mošćenička Draga
- Mrkopalj
- Omišalj
- Punat
- Ravna Gora
- Skrad
- Vinodol
- Viškovo
- Vrbnik

==== Šibenik-Knin County ====
- Bilice
- Biskupija
- Civljane
- Ervenik
- Kijevo
- Kistanje
- Murter-Kornati
- Pirovac
- Primošten
- Promina
- Rogoznica
- Ružić
- Tisno
- Unešić
- Tribunj

==== Split-Dalmatia County ====
- Baška Voda
- Bol
- Brela
- Cista Provo
- Dicmo
- Dugi Rat
- Dugopolje
- Gradac
- Hrvace
- Jelsa
- Klis
- Lećevica
- Lokvičići
- Lovreć
- Marina
- Milna
- Muć
- Nerežišća
- Okrug
- Otok Dalmatinski
- Podbablje
- Podgora
- Podstrana
- Postira
- Prgomet
- Primorski Dolac
- Proložac
- Pučišća
- Runovići
- Seget
- Selca
- Sućuraj
- Sutivan
- Šestanovac
- Šolta
- Tučepi
- Zadvarje
- Zagvozd
- Zmijavci

==== Zadar County ====
- Bibinje
- Galovac
- Gračac
- Jasenice
- Kali
- Kolan
- Kukljica
- Lišane Ostrovičke
- Novigrad
- Pakoštane
- Pašman
- Polača
- Poličnik
- Posedarje
- Povljana
- Preko
- Privlaka
- Ražanac
- Sali
- Stankovci
- Starigrad
- Sukošan
- Sveti Filip i Jakov
- Škabrnja
- Tkon
- Vir
- Vrsi
- Zemunik Donji

== See also ==
- Administrative divisions of Croatia
- List of cities and towns in Croatia
- Association of Municipalities of the Republic of Croatia
- Joint Council of Municipalities
- Cadastral community
