= Franjo Gaži (politician, born 1912) =

- Born: 1 April 1912; Peteranec, Kingdom of Croatia-Slavonia, Austria-Hungary (now Croatia)
- Died: 10 January 1990 (aged 77); Zagreb, Socialist Republic of Croatia, Socialist Federal Republic of Yugoslavia
- Education: University of Zagreb
- Occupations: Politician, agronomist, translator
- Political party: Croatian Peasant Party

Franjo Gaži (1 April 1912 in Peteranec – 10 January 1990 in Zagreb) was a Croatian agronomist and translator. Gaži graduated from the School of Agriculture and Forestry of the University of Zagreb in 1937. He worked in the Department of Agruculture of the Banovina of Croatia before becoming a Yugoslav trade attaché in Moscow in 1940–1941. After the German invasion of the Soviet Union, Gaži moved to Jerusalem, Istanbul, Cairo and London where he worked with the Allies to secure economic aid for Yugoslavia. After the war, he was appointed a delegate to the third session of the Anti-Fascist Council for the National Liberation of Yugoslavia on behalf of the Croatian Peasant Party and worked in the Yugoslav Ministry of Trade and Supply with the United Nations Relief and Rehabilitation Administration directorate for Yugoslavia. As a political ally of the Foreign Minister Ivan Šubašić, Gaži resigned his post in October 1945. In 1947, he was arrested on charges of attempting to establish a Peasant Bloc in opposition to the Communist Party of Yugoslavia and imprisoned for five years. After release, he pursued a managerial career in agriculture and a translator career.
