= Fran Galović =

Croatian writer (1887–1914)

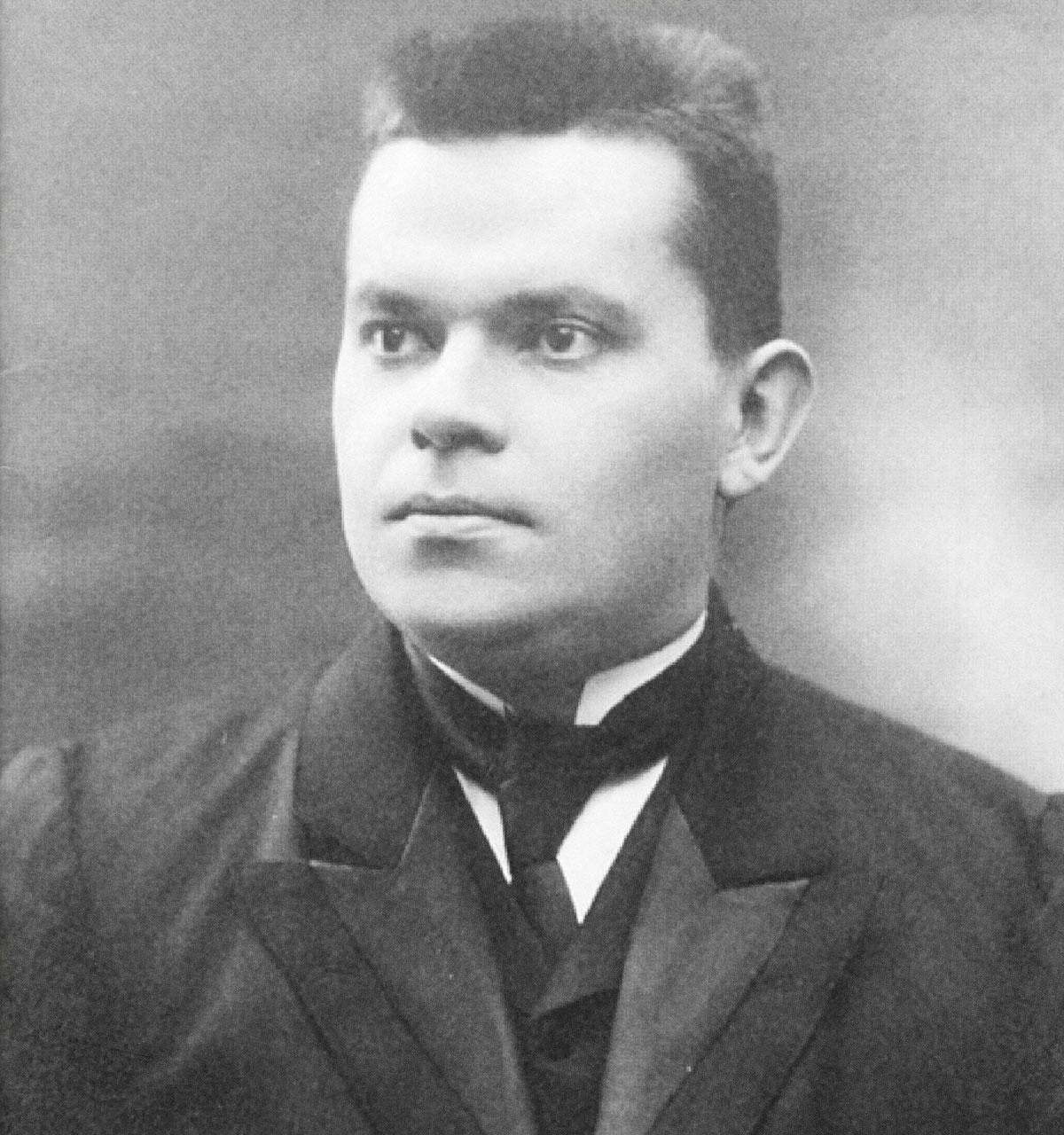
- Born: 20 July 1887; Peteranec, Austria-Hungary (now Peteranec, Croatia)
- Died: 25 October 1914 (aged 27); Radenković, Austria-Hungary (now Radenković, Serbia)
- Writing career
- Pen name: Gledalac ('The Spectator'); Hrvatski đak ('The Croatian Student'); Samotni putnik ('The Lone Traveler')
- Language: Croatian (Kajkavian, Štokavian)
- Notable work: Z mojih bregov

Fran Galović (Croatian pronunciation: [frǎːn gâːlovit͡ɕ], 20 July 1887 – 26 October 1914) was a Croatian poet, playwright, writer, and theater critic.

== Biography ==
Galović was born in Peteranec near Koprivnica, the only son of Stjepan, a well-off peasant, and Dora (née Jadanić). He studied Slavistics and philology in Zagreb, focusing primarily on the Croatian language and literature, with classical philology of Latin and Greek as secondary focuses. During his studies, he joined the youth wing of the Party of Rights movement and became editor for its magazine, Mlada Hrvatska ('Young Croatia'). However, due to his participation in a student strike, he spent his fourth semester in Prague. In 1909, he voluntarily registered for military service, serving as a reservist cadet for the 27th Home Guard Infantry Regiment in Sisak. In 1913, he finished his studies in philology and began teaching at the Second Gymnasium in Zagreb. In 1914, he finished his Slavistics studies and continued his critical works.

By autumn of 1914, Galović was mobilized and served as a warrant officer during the Serbian campaign of World War I. He was killed in combat on 26 October 1914, in Mačva near Radenković. A day earlier, he had written to his friend and fellow writer Milan Ogrizović:

My dear, I greet you once again. It's morning and we have to rush at 10 o'clock. It's sunny, Sunday and a wonderful, warm morning. One would really like to die on such a sunny day. Tell Sanctissima (Note: Ogrizović's wife, Ljuba. From Latin, literally 'the most sacred'.) to pray for the repose of my soul if I am gone. Your Fran loves you. (Note: Original Croatian: Moj dragi, još jednom Te pozdravljam. Jutro je i u 10 sati imamo navaliti. Sunce je, nedjelja i divno, toplo jutro. Čovjek bi čisto želio umrijeti u ovako sunča dan. Reci Sanctissimi da se pomoli za upokoj moje duše ako me više ne bude. Ljubi te tvoj Fran.)

Galović was buried on 31 October 1914 in Mirogoj Cemetery.

== Publications ==
Only four of Galović's books were published during his lifetime: Tamara (1907), Četiri grada ('Four Cities', 1913), Začarano ogledalo ('The Enchanted Mirror', 1913) and Ispovijed ('Confession', 1914). Although most of his poems were written in his native Kajkavian dialect, only his Štokavian poetry was published while he was still alive.

In one of his Kajkavian collections, Z mojih bregov ('From My Little Hills'), Galović repeated some motifs known from his Štokavian poetry: the drama of leaving the homeland, the impossibility of return, the unattainability of happiness, the anxiety of losing one's roots, the tragedy of transience. In some poems, impressionistic images of idyllic homeland predominate and some resemble expressionist miniatures with a strong charge of apart sensibility (lonely premonitions of death, unknown "something", pictorial and sound grotesque). Acting in the era of Croatian modernity, he accepted a variety of artistic and aesthetic programs. That is why his works are marked by stylistic searches in a thematic range from ancient mythology to the twilight atmospheres of European symbolism.

Galović's legacy in Croatian literature remains strong. Since 1994, a yearly celebration of his work – called "Galović's Autumn" (Croatian: Galovićeva jesen) – is hosted by the Croatian Ministry of Culture and Media and the city of Koprivnica.

== Works ==
- Tamara
- Četiri grada
- Začarano ogledalo
- Ispovijed

Posthumously:

- Pjesme, 1, 2, 1940.
- Članci i kritike, 1942.
- Drame, 1942.
- Pripovijesti, 1942.
- Djela Frana Galovića, 1-10, 1942.-1943.
- Pjesme, 1943.
- Z mojih bregov, 1948.
- Poezija i proza, 1963.
- Lirika. Pripovijetke. Drame. Kritika, 1966.
- Izbor iz djela, 1969.
- Z mojih bregov, 1944.
- Izabrana djela, 1997.
- Izabrane pjesme, 1997.
- Izbor iz djela, 1999.
- Zeleni oblak, 2000.
- Z mojih bregov i druge pjesme, 2002.
- Pjesme, 2005.
- Pripovijetke, 2005.
- Sabrana djela Frana Galovića, 2006.
- Drame I., 2007.

== Bibliography ==
- Baković, Matijas (2018). "Nekrolozi povodom smrti Frana Galovića" [Fran Galović obituaries] (PDF). Hum (in Croatian). 13 (20): 275–288.
- Kadić, Ante (1960). Contemporary Croatian Literature. Mouton.
