= Krešimir Baranović =

Croatian composer and conductor

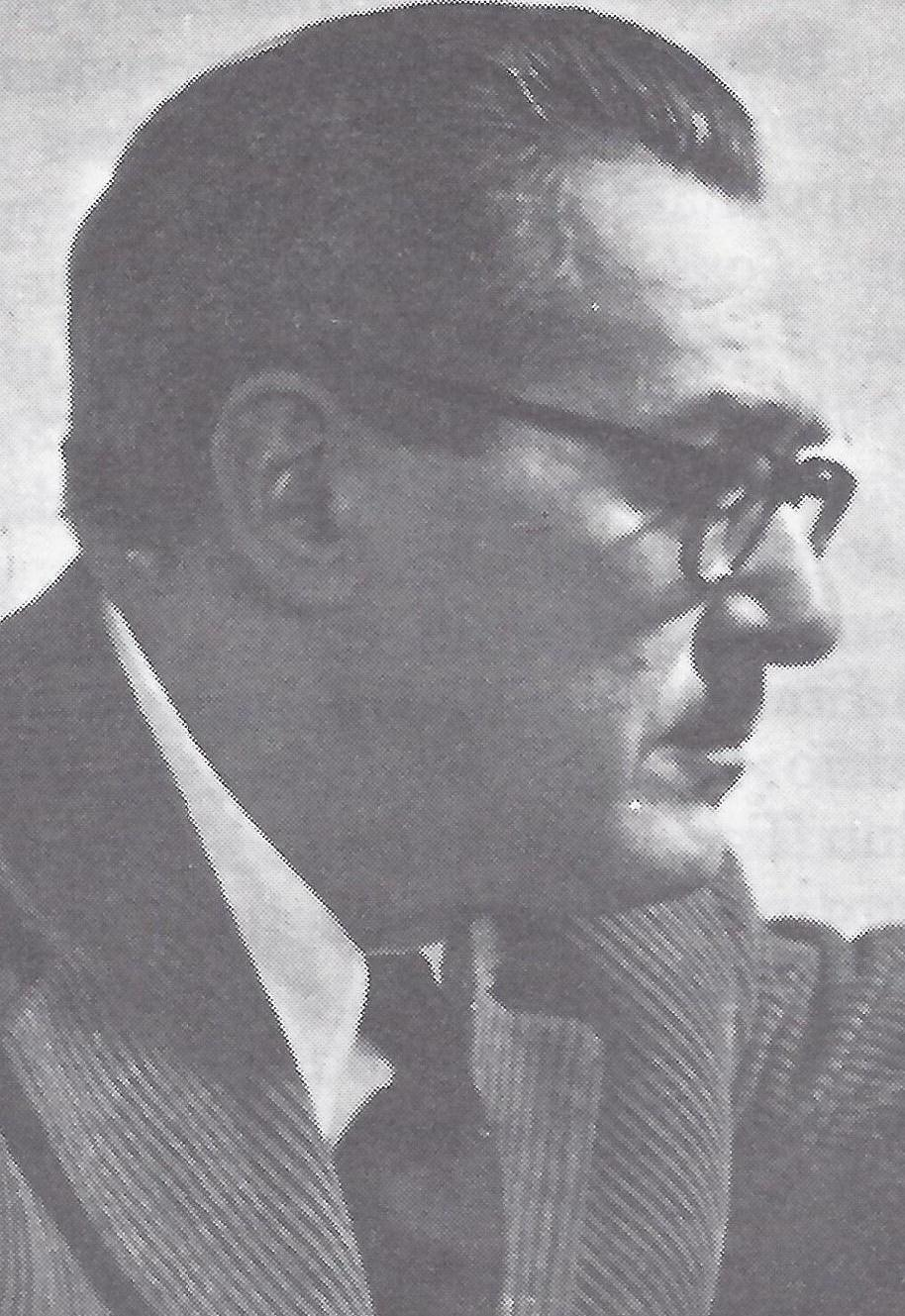
- Born: 25 July 1894; Šibenik, Kingdom of Dalmatia, Austria-Hungary
- Died: 17 September 1975 (aged 81); Belgrade, SR Serbia, SFR Yugoslavia
- Era: 20th century
- Works: http://quercus.mic.hr/quercus/person/448

Krešimir Baranović (25 July 1894 – 17 September 1975) was a Croatian composer and conductor. He was director and conductor of the Zagreb Opera, Belgrade Opera and professor at the Belgrade Music Academy. In the spirit of a kind of Slavic expressionism, also seen in the works of Janáček and some of the 19th century Russian masters, Baranović was better than any other Croatian composer of his time in overcoming the discrepancy between the national and the universal to be seen in Croatian interwar music.

== Biography ==
From 1908 to 1912 Baranović was studying music in Zagreb. He took private lessons from Dragutin (Carlo) Kaiser and then in the school of the Croatian Music Institute where he studied horn with Fran Lhotka. After that, he went to the Music Academy in Vienna (1912–1914) and later that in Berlin (1921–1922). From 1915 to 1943 he was the conductor of the Croatian National Theatre Opera in Zagreb (and the director of it from 1929 to 1940); at that time it went through one of its finest periods. In the season 1927/28, he was also conductor for the Anna Pavlova ballet troupe on her European tour, and was long-term conductor of the Lisinski Choir. After leaving Zagreb in the first years of the war he was imprisoned in the Stara Gradiška camp, and then for some time was conductor of the Bratislava Radio Orchestra (1943) as well as being the director of the Bratislava Opera (1945–1946). From 1946 to 1964 he was teacher of conducting and orchestration at the Music Academy in Belgrade, and from 1951 to 1961 director and conductor of the Belgrade Philharmonic Orchestra. From 1954, he was a fellow of the Yugoslav Academy of Sciences and Arts in Zagreb. Member of Serbian Academy of Science and Arts since 1968.

== Oeuvre ==
In the spirit of a kind of Slavic expressionism, also seen in the works of Janáček and some of the 19th century Russian masters, Baranović was better than any other Serbian composer of his time in overcoming the discrepancy between the national and the universal to be seen in Serbian and Croatian interwar music. In his valuable works the ballet Gingerbread Heart (1924), the song cycle From My Hills (to verses of Fran Galović, 1927) and in the comic opera Sheared-Mown (1932) he drew the authenticity of his idiom from the folk music of Hrvatsko zagorje, the foundation of an artistic transformation of Stravinskyan dimensions. A master of instrumentation, with a marked feeling for rhythmical structure and a special sense for humour, even of the coarsely grotesque (the ballet Imbrek with a Nose, 1935), Baranović sidestepped the restorer's gesture of neo-Classicism, widening the ranges of inherited expressiveness, particularly in terms of harmony. While Baranović's works after 1943 – the orchestral poems From Solitude (to his own words, 1944) and Clouds (verses of Dobriša Cesarić, 1963) more thoroughly set free dissonant harmonic sets, his larger vocal and instrumental works of the 1960s and 1970s do nevertheless pay a tribute to the simplifications enjoined by the aesthetics of what was called engaged realism.

As symphonic and particularly operatic conductor, Baranović much enriched reproductive practice. He was the first in Croatia to conduct a performance of Mussorgsky’s Boris Godunov in 1918 and Shostakovich’s Katerina Izmailova in 1937, and was the first to put the most important ballets of Stravinsky on the Zagreb stage, the first outside Czechoslovakia to put on Smetana’s Libuše. He paid a lot of attention to first performances of the most important music theatre works of Croatian composers.

== Selected works ==
=== Stage works ===
==== Ballet ====
- Gingerbread Heart (1924)
- Flowers of Little Ida (1925)
- Chinese Story (1955)

==== Opera ====
- Bride of Cetingrad (1951), comic opera
- Sheared-Mown (1932), comic opera

=== Orchestra ===
- From Solitude (to his own words, 1944), orchestral poem
- Clouds (words by Dobriša Cesarić, 1963), orchestral poem
- Concert Overture (1916)
- Symphonic Scherzo (1921)
- Poème balkanique (1926)
- Sinfonietta in E flat major (1939)
- Concerto for Horn and Orchestra (1973)

=== Vocal and orchestral works ===
- From My Hills (to verses of Fran Galović, 1927)
- My City (words by Vinko Nikolić, 1941)
- Pan (words by Miroslav Krleža, 1957)
- Forests, Forests (1967)
- At Sea (words by Gustav Krklec, 1974)
