= List of prefects of Koprivnica-Križevci County =

This is a list of prefects of Koprivnica-Križevci County.

== Prefects of Koprivnica-Križevci County (1993–present) ==
Croatian Peasant Party (HSS)
Croatian Democratic Union (HDZ)
Independent
Social Democratic Party of Croatia (SDP)

№	Portrait	Name (Born–Died)	Term of Office		Party
1		Ivan Stančer (1933–2018)	4 May 1993	5 June 1997	HSS
2		Nikola Gregur (1953–)	5 June 1997	21 June 2001	HDZ
3		Josip Friščić (1949–2016)	21 June 2001	9 January 2008	HSS
4		Darko Koren (1963–)	9 January 2008	5 June 2025	HSS (2008–2017)
4		Darko Koren (1963–)	9 January 2008	5 June 2025	Independent (from 2017)
5		Tomislav Golubić (1984–)	5 June 2025	Incumbent	SDP

== See also ==
- Koprivnica-Križevci County
