= Slaven Dobrović =

Croatian politician (born 1967)

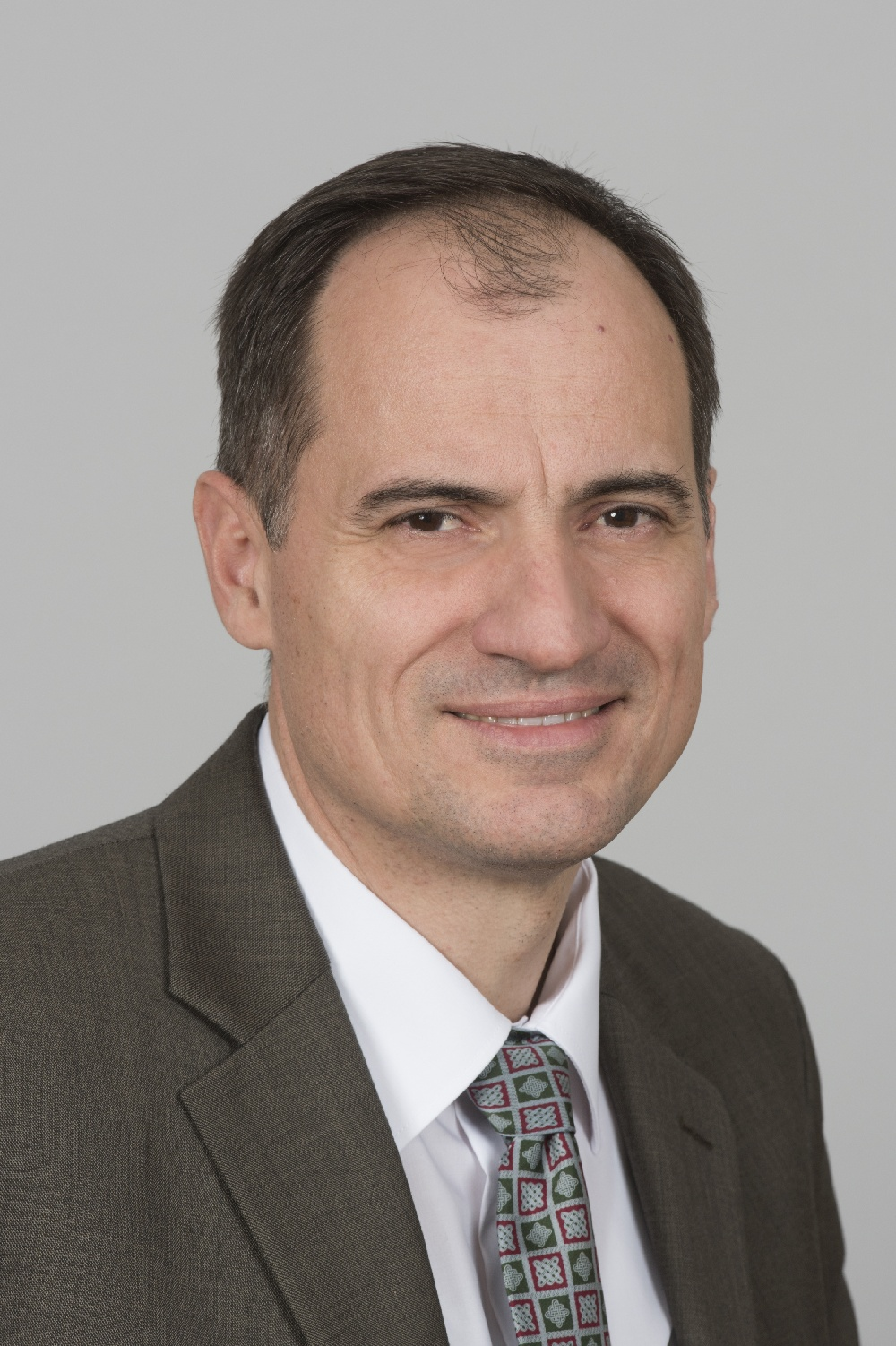
Slaven Dobrović in 2016

Slaven Dobrović (born 29 August 1967 in Zadar) is a Croatian politician from Home and National Rally. He served as Minister of Environmental Protection and Energy.
