= Mario Radić (politician) =

Croatian businessman and politician (born 1970)

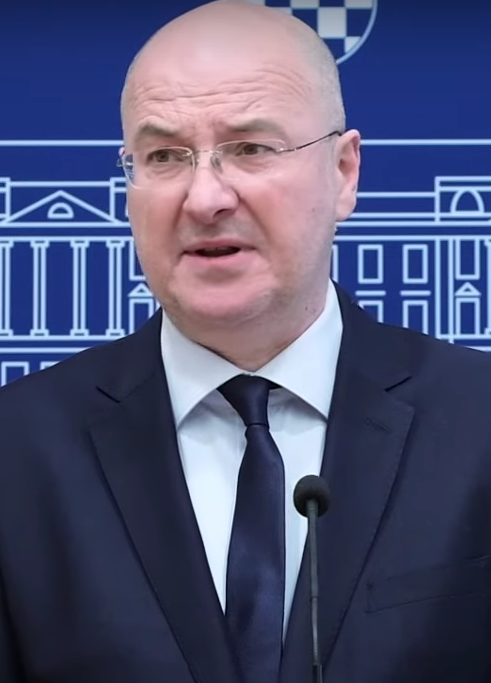
- Radić in 2024

Member of the Croatian Parliament
- In office 22 July 2020 – 16 May 2024
- Constituency: Eectoral district IV

Personal details
- Born: 10 October 1970 (age 55) Vukovar, SR Croatia, SFR Yugoslavia
- Party: Homeland Movement (2020–2024); DOMiNO (2024–present)
- Occupation: Businessman; politician

Mario Radić (born 10 October 1970) is a Croatian businessman and politician that served as a member of the Croatian Parliament from 2020 to 2024. A former deputy president of the Homeland Movement (DP), he is the founder and current president of the Home and National Rally (DOMiNO) party.

== Early life, education and business career ==
Radić was born on 10 October 1970 in Vukovar, SR Croatia, SFR Yugoslavia. His father and uncle died during the Croatian War of Independence and he himself participated in the Battle of Vukovar. Later he graduated in telecommunications and in 1994 founded a company called Dicentra.

Radić developed his business, started an additional company Filir, with which he later bought the snack manufacturer Bobi Snacks, and became one of the most influential businessmen in Slavonia. In 2017, became the president of the supervisory board of the then Pevec, which recovered in bankruptcy proceedings. Pevec was later transformed to Pevex.

== Political career ==
Radić was not involved in politics until his friend Miroslav Škoro formed the Homeland Movement (DP) in 2020. Radić was elected to the Croatian Parliament in the 2020 parliamentary election, but his term was suspended from 2020 until 2023. He was the deputy president of DP until September 2024. In early September 2024, Radić announced his departure from DP and in late September announced the formation of Home and National Gathering (DOMiNO) with him as the president.
