= Rasinja =

- Interactive map of Rasinja
- Location of Rasinja in Croatia
- Coordinates: 46.185°N 16.7°E
- Country: Croatia
- County: Koprivnica-Križevci County

Government
  - Mayor: Davor Tetec (SDP)

Area
  - City: 106.0 km^{2} (40.9 sq mi)
  - Urban: 15.6 km^{2} (6.0 sq mi)

Population (2021)
  - City: 2,631
  - Density: 24.82/km^{2} (64.29/sq mi)
  - Urban: 730
  - Urban density: 47/km^{2} (120/sq mi)
- Postal code: 48000 Koprivnica
- Website: rasinja.hr

Rasinja is a settlement and an eponymous municipality in northern Croatia in Koprivnica–Križevci County, located halfway between Koprivnica and Ludbreg.

== History ==
In the late 19th century and early 20th century, Rasinja was part of Varaždin County of the Kingdom of Croatia-Slavonia.

== Demographics ==
In 2021, the municipality had 2,631 residents in the following 21 settlements:

- Belanovo Selo, population 37
- Cvetkovec, population 154
- Duga Rijeka, population 132
- Gorica, population 111
- Grbaševec, population 20
- Ivančec, population 48
- Koledinec, population 120
- Kuzminec, population 219
- Ludbreški Ivanac, population 53
- Lukovec, population 32
- Mala Rasinjica, population 19
- Mala Rijeka, population 25
- Prkos, population 42
- Radeljevo Selo, population 79
- Rasinja, population 730
- Ribnjak, population 38
- Subotica Podravska, population 471
- Velika Rasinjica, population 16
- Veliki Grabičani, population 65
- Veliki Poganac, population 165
- Vojvodinec, population 55
Rasinja: Population trends 1857–2021
v

population	4473	5285	5579	6649	6903	7176	6759	6631	6120	6276	6275	5551	4731	4027	3818	3267	2631
	1857	1869	1880	1890	1900	1910	1921	1931	1948	1953	1961	1971	1981	1991	2001	2011	2021

Sources: Croatian Bureau of Statistics publications

== Administration ==
The current mayor of Rasinja is Davor Tetec (SDP) while the deputy mayor is Nikica Štibić (HNS) from the Serb minority. The Rasinja Municipal Council consists of 13 seats.

Groups	Councilors per group
SDP	7 / 13
Free Voters Group	3 / 13
HNS-HSS	2 / 13
HDZ	1 / 13

== Religion ==
Serbian Orthodox Church of Saint George in the village of Veliki Poganac was built in 1722 and its bell tower was erected in 1751. Adjacent parochial house was built in 1879. Church's iconostasis was erected and painted in 1779. Church was declared protected cultural heritage of the Republic of Croatia in 1965.

== Literature ==
- Obad Šćitaroci, Mladen; Bojanić Obad Šćitaroci, Bojana; Dundović, Boris (2013). "Manors and Gardens in Northern Croatia in the Age of Historicism" (PDF). Centropa. pp. 175–186. ISSN 1532-5563. Archived from the original (PDF) on 2025-05-05.
