= Branimir Glavaš =

Croatian politician

President of the Croatian Democratic Alliance of Slavonia and Baranja
- In office 2007–2015

Member of the Croatian Parliament
- In office 1995–2007

Personal details
- Born: 23 September 1956 (age 69) Osijek, SR Croatia, SFR Yugoslavia (modern Croatia)
- Party: Croatian Democratic Union (HDZ)
- Occupation: Politician
- Awards: See Decorations section

Military service
- Allegiance: Croatia
- Branch/service: Croatian Army
- Years of service: 1991–1995
- Battles/wars: Croatian War of Independence

Branimir Glavaš (born 23 September 1956 in Osijek) is a Croatian retired major general and politician. He was one of the founders of the Croatian Democratic Union (HDZ) party which was in power in the 1990s and one of its key figures until a split in 2006. In 2009, Glavaš was found guilty of war crimes, including torture and murder of civilians, during his tenure as major general in the Croatian War of Independence.

Glavaš came to prominence in his home city of Osijek in eastern Croatia during the war when he led its defense and attained the rank of major general in the Croatian Army. After the war he continued to exercise much influence as one of the leading members of Croatian Democratic Union (HDZ).

In 2005, Glavaš was charged with war crimes at a Croatian court; he left HDZ and founded a new party – the Croatian Democratic Assembly of Slavonia and Baranja (HDSSB). After a lengthy and controversial trial, during which he was re-elected to parliament and had to be stripped of immunity twice, in 2009 he was found guilty of torture and murder of Serb civilians in Osijek during the war, and was sentenced to 10 years in prison by the Zagreb County Court. He then fled to neighbouring Bosnia and Herzegovina where he was arrested. In September 2010, his conviction was upheld by a Bosnian court, though the sentence had been reduced to 8 years in prison. On 20 January 2015, after serving five years in prison, he was released from prison, after Croatia's Constitutional Court rescinded his war crimes conviction on procedural grounds. His case was sent back to the Supreme Court for retrial. In July 2016, the Supreme Court quashed his verdict and ordered a retrial.

In 2021, a new retrial began, with Glavaš being retried along with three of his subordinates. In October 2023, he was convicted and sentenced to seven years in prison in a first instance verdict. The Zagreb County Court upheld the verdict in June 2026.

== Early life and military career ==
Glavaš' father Ljubomir and his mother Zorka (née Pandžić), were born in Drinovci, Grude (present-day Bosnia and Herzegovina) and moved to Osijek in 1949. He attended gymnasium in his home town of Osijek and graduated from the Faculty of Law of the University of Osijek. In 1990 Glavaš was one of the founders of the Croatian Democratic Union (HDZ), and one of the most prominent members of that party in Slavonia. In the same year he was elected to the Croatian Parliament (Sabor) and later became part of the last Croatian delegation in the House of Republics and provinces of the Yugoslav Federal Assembly.

When the tensions between the new Croatian government and Croatia's ethnic Serb minority began to escalate, Glavaš emerged as one of the most militant Croatian politicians, earning the reputation of a maverick. From 12 October 1990 until 24 April 1992 he was secretary of the Secretariat for Defense of the Osijek municipality (Sekretarijat za narodnu obranu općine Osijek), becoming one of the most important officials in charge of defending Osijek and Slavonia.

On 2 November 1991, with Croatian War of Independence and Battle of Osijek already in progress, he was appointed assistant to the commander for the defence of Osijek in charge of territorial co-ordination and public relations. On 1 December 1991 he was appointed to the rank of major (bojnik) and on 7 December 1991, he was appointed commander of defence for Osijek. In April 1992, after the Command for the defence of Osijek was dissolved, he was named Assistant to the Commander of First Operation Zone, Osijek.

== Political career after the war ==
After demobilisation, on 30 May 1992, he was elected president of Executive council of the Osijek municipality Assembly. At the February 1993 elections he was elected delegate to the Chamber of Counties (Županijski dom Sabora), and on 14 April 1993, he became the first prefect (župan) of the Osijek-Baranja County.

Over time, Glavaš developed a rivalry with the Osijek mayor Zlatko Kramarić, who was his opposite in everything—from politics to style. After the 1993 local elections, Kramarić came to power in Osijek, but Glavaš and his HDZ kept the rest of the Osijek-Baranja County. In that period Glavaš surprised many by offering agricultural subsidies to ethnic Serb citizens in then-occupied sections of eastern Slavonia, and explaining that he would be "first in peace just as he was first in war".

In the October 1995 elections he was elected to the Chamber of Representatives (Zastupnički dom Sabora), then he was re-elected to the Chamber of Counties at the April 1997 elections, and in May 1997 he was also reelected prefect of the Osijek-Baranja County.

In October 1997, he was named the Inspector of the Croatian Army (Inspektor Hrvatske Vojske) at the Inspectorate General of the Armed Forces of the Republic of Croatia (Glavna Inspekcija Oružanih Snaga Republike Hrvatske), a part of the Ministry of Defence. In February 1999, he returned to his county political office, where he remained until the end of June 2000.

In November 1997, he petitioned the authorities to recognize his partial disability, caused by a broken rib injury he sustained while driving near Bjelovar in January 1992. He was later temporarily stripped of the disabled veteran status, until it was reinstated by a court order.

He was reelected to the Croatian Parliament in the January 2000 elections.

Glavaš maintained a tight grip on power and eastern Slavonia remained an HDZ stronghold even after the death of Franjo Tuđman and his party's loss of power at the national level in 2000. In 2002, when hardliner Ivić Pašalić challenged the more moderate HDZ leader Ivo Sanader for party leadership, Glavaš, despite his own hardline credentials, decided to support Sanader. In the crucial HDZ convention, this endorsement helped Sanader to remain the party chairman.

A year later, the HDZ won the November 2003 parliamentary election and Sanader became prime minister, with Glavaš as one of his most important allies. Glavaš was reelected to Parliament in the same election.

=== Split with HDZ ===
As time went by and Ivo Sanader's policies became less popular, and there were apparent setbacks for Croatia's prospects for entry into the EU, so Glavaš began to publicly distance himself from Sanader. Glavaš expressed Euroscepticism with regard to how the EU would handle the Croatian accession negotiations, and was critical towards the International Criminal Tribunal for the former Yugoslavia (ICTY).

This process escalated a few days before the start of local elections in May 2005. Glavaš proclaimed himself to be a regionalist and began to advocate regional reorganisation of Croatia, founding a political organisation with that aim. On 20 April 2005, the programme of the Hrvatski demokratski sabor Slavonije i Baranje - Croatian Democratic Assembly of Slavonia and Baranja - was first published. Glavaš was immediately ejected from the HDZ the following day but not before persuading almost the entire membership of his local party to support his project and new electoral ticket.

In the 2005 Croatian local elections, his list of independent candidates won a relative majority in Osijek and Osijek-Baranja County. This prompted Kramarić to approach all other parties in Osijek and attempt to form a broad anti-Glavaš coalition, an offer which was accepted and resulted in HDZ loyalists being allied with the likes of the Social Democratic Party of Croatia. In June 2005 Glavaš defeated this scheme, first by allying with the far-right Croatian Party of Rights (HSP), in a coalition that gave the HSP the mayoral position in Osijek for the first time; and then by persuading some assemblymen of the anti-Glavaš coalition to support his candidates in inaugural sessions of the Osijek-Baranja County and City of Osijek assembly.

On 21 May 2005, Glavaš and his supporters founded a new political party - Hrvatski demokratski savez Slavonije i Baranje - the Croatian Democratic Alliance of Slavonia and Baranja.

== War crimes charges ==
In July 2005, Glavaš was publicly implicated in the 1991 murders of Serb civilians in Osijek. In May 2006, Croatian chief prosecutor Mladen Bajić asked the Croatian Parliament to deprive Glavaš of his parliamentary immunity, in order to start formal criminal proceedings in the case. On 10 May, this request was granted.

During the proceedings, prosecutors failed twice in their attempts to have Glavaš arrested, because investigative magistrates and local courts rejected their demands to issue arrest warrants. However, on 23 October one investigative magistrate issued an arrest warrant, which was approved by the Mandate-Immunity Committee of Croatian Parliament after four days of dramatic and confusing deliberations. Glavaš was arrested on 26 October and put in jail for fear that he might influence witnesses if he was bailed.

Osijek's investigative judge Mario Kovac ruled that the case against Glavaš could begin. Glavaš subsequently went on hunger strike. On 2 December 2006, Glavaš was released from custody pending his trial, bringing to an end his 37-day hunger strike. The investigating judge had ruled that Glavaš was too ill to attend legal hearings, and investigations were suspended. On 8 February 2007, the case against Glavaš was reopened.

On 16 April 2007, Glavaš was re-indicted at the county court in Osijek, on charges of having given orders to members of a unit under his command to abduct, torture and murder Serbs in late 1991. Following the indictment, he was returned to custody. He started a second hunger strike on 27 April. On 9 May, a second indictment was brought against him on charges of ordering the torture and killing of at least two Serb civilians. His trial began in Osijek on 15 October 2007.

In the Croatian elections of 25 November 2007, Glavaš was re-elected to parliament. This restored his immunity, and he was released from detention. On 14 July 2008, the trial was adjourned until September 2008 because of the purported poor health of one of Glavaš' co-accused. Under Croatian law, as there was a break of more than two months in the trial, there had to be a retrial.

Glavaš and his supporters claimed the criminal investigation was politically motivated and pointed to its commencement having coincided with Glavaš's departure from the ruling HDZ party. It was also reported that witnesses in the trial, including Osijek-based journalist Drago Hedl, had been threatened.

On 8 May 2009, the Zagreb District Court found Glavaš guilty of torture and murder of Serbian civilians in Osijek, and sentenced him to ten years in prison. The trial involved two cases codenamed 'garage' and 'sellotape'. In the first case, the court found that prisoners were kept in a garage by Glavaš's unit where they were tortured and killed. One man was forced to drink battery acid and after attempting to flee from the pain, was shot and killed. The other involved six civilians who were detained and tortured in a basement in November and December 1991 in Osijek. Afterwards, they were brought to the Drava riverbank, where the unit's members executed them, with their hands tied behind their backs with sellotape. The subordinates accused in the case, Ivica Krnjak was sentenced to eight years while Dino Kontić, Zdravko Dragić and Tihomir Valentić received five years. Following the verdict however, Vladimir Šišljagić, the leader of HDSSB, the political party Glavaš founded when he left HDZ, showed up in court instead of him and stated that he was "in a safe place". Glavaš fled the country, reportedly to Herzegovina, having procured citizenship in Bosnia and Herzegovina seven months earlier.

On 13 May 2009, Glavaš was arrested near the Bosnian town of Kupres. The Ministry of Justice filed a request for his extradition but this was rejected on 23 June 2009. In June 2010, the Supreme Court of Croatia confirmed the guilty verdict for Glavaš and others, but reduced the sentence slightly, to eight years of prison. Meanwhile, Krnjak's sentence was reduced to seven years, Getos Magdić's to five years, Dino Kontić and Zdravko Dragi's to three and a half years and Valentić's to four and a half years.

The verdict meant his membership in the Parliament automatically rescinded, together with the immunity and other privileges he continued to enjoy up to that moment. The parliamentary committee subsequently decided that his mandate ended with the day of the final verdict, 2 May 2010, a decision he publicly appealed saying he was still owed one month's salary.

Another scandal arose after it was discovered that prominent members of Glavaš' political party had participated in a plot to bribe members of the Supreme Court to show him leniency.

Based upon the agreement of mutual execution of criminal sanctions between Croatia and Bosnia and Herzegovina, the Court of Bosnia and Herzegovina confirmed the second-instance verdict and Glavaš was arrested in Drinovci on 28 September 2010. He was incarcerated in the southern Bosnian town of Mostar. On 20 January 2015, Croatia's Constitutional Court rescinded Glavaš' war crimes conviction on procedural grounds. He was released from prison after having served five years of his original sentence.

His case was sent back to the Supreme Court for a retrial. He is the highest ranking Croatian official to have ever been convicted for war crimes by a local judiciary.

In July 2016, the Supreme Court quashed his verdict and ordered a full retrial. In 2021, a new retrial began, with Glavaš being retried along with his subordinates Gordana Getos Magdić, Dino Kontić, and Zdravko Dragić. In October 2023, he was convicted and sentenced to seven years in prison in a first instance verdict. Magdić was sentenced to four years, Kontić and Dragić each to three years. Glavaš vowed to challenge the decision.

Following the first-instance verdict, Glavaš again escaped to Bosnia and Herzegovina at the end of October 2023. He returned to Croatia in mid-December 2023 and has been residing in Osijek ever since. He appealed his verdict once again.

On 18 April 2025, Glavaš announced his candidacy in the local elections, seeking his third term as prefect of the Osijek-Baranja County. On 10 June 2026, the Zagreb County Court upheld Glavaš's sentence.

== Decorations ==
Due to his contribution during Croatian War of Independence Glavaš was rewarded with several medals:

- Homeland's Gratitude Medal
- Homeland War Memorial Medal
- Order of the Croatian Trefoil
- Order of Ante Starčević
- Order of Ban Jelačić
- Order of Duke Domagoj
- Order of Duke Trpimir

After his war crimes conviction, the revocation of these decorations was an oft-mentioned topic in the media, and both Croatian Presidents Mesić and Josipović said that they would handle the issue according to the law which states that illegal and immoral acts are grounds for revocation.

Following the Supreme Court verdict, President Josipović formally took away the decorations, but not before Glavaš claimed to the media that he had sold his medals. Josipović responded by stating that the metal insignia can be dealt with whichever way one wishes to deal with them, but that the moral content of the honor is bestowed by the President of the Republic.

In August 2010, President Josipović also said that Glavaš would enter a military procedure for his rank of general to be rescinded, based on the law which stipulates that officers who are given a prolonged prison sentence (over three years) lose their rank. A month later, he issued a decision to that effect for Mirko Norac, Vladimir Zagorec, Tihomir Orešković and Siniša Rimac also.

In 2021, President Zoran Milanović annulled the decision on the revocation of Glavaš' decorations and rank, saying the decision had been made based on Supreme Court's request for a retrial. He added he would reinstate the original decision if Glavaš were to be convicted again. Upon Glavaš' conviction being upheld in June 2026, Milanović stripped him of his state decorations.
