= Koprivnički Bregi =

- Municipality
- Interactive map of Koprivnički Bregi
- Location of Koprivnički Bregi in Croatia
- Coordinates: 46°08′N 16°55′E
- Country: Croatia
- County: Koprivnica-Križevci County

Government
  - Mayor: Kristina Škoda Vajdić (HSS)

Area
  - Municipality: 33.5 km^{2} (12.9 sq mi)
  - Urban: 19.0 km^{2} (7.3 sq mi)

Population (2021)
  - Municipality: 1,968
  - Density: 58.7/km^{2} (152/sq mi)
  - Urban: 1,118
  - Urban density: 58.8/km^{2} (152/sq mi)
- Postal code: 48000 Koprivnica
- Website: koprivnicki-bregi.hr

Koprivnički Bregi is a village and a municipality in the Koprivnica-Križevci County in Croatia.

In the 2021 census, there were a total of 1,968 inhabitants. Croats formed an absolute majority at 90.96%.

== Demographics ==
In 2021, the municipality had 1,968 residents in the following settlements:

- Glogovac, population 764
- Jeduševac, population 86
- Koprivnički Bregi, population 1,118
Koprivnički Bregi: Population trends 1857–2021
v

population	1633	1773	1785	1834	1840	544	562	2403	2582	2819	3171	3070	2828	2706	2549	2381	1968
	1857	1869	1880	1890	1900	1910	1921	1931	1948	1953	1961	1971	1981	1991	2001	2011	2021

Sources: Croatian Bureau of Statistics publications

== Administration ==
The current mayor of Koprivnički Bregi is Kristina Škoda Vajdić (HSS) and the Koprivnički Bregi Municipal Council consists of 9 seats.

Groups	Councilors per group
HSS	2 / 9
DHSS-Most-DOMiNO	2 / 9
HDZ-Mreža	2 / 9
Krešimir Rajtarić	1 / 9
Tomislav Maljak	1 / 9
SDP	1 / 9
