= Krešimir Bubalo =

Croatian politician (born 1973)

Mayor of Osijek
- In office 4 June 2009 – 10 June 2013
- Preceded by: Anto Đapić
- Succeeded by: Ivan Vrkić

Personal details
- Born: 5 November 1973 (age 52) Osijek, SFR Yugoslavia
- Party: Croatian Democratic Alliance of Slavonia and Baranja

Krešimir Bubalo (born 5 November 1973) is a Croatian politician. He graduated in business economics from the University of Osijek. He served as Mayor of Osijek, his home city, between 2009 and 2013, and then from September 2013 as the HDSSB member of parliament for the 4th constituency.
