= Ferdinandovac =

- Interactive map of Ferdinandovac
- Location within Croatia
- Coordinates: 46°03′N 17°12′E
- Country: Croatia
- County: Koprivnica-Križevci County

Government
  - Municipal Mayor: Vjekoslav Maletić (Mreža)

Area
  - Total: 49.7 km^{2} (19.2 sq mi)

Population (2021)
  - Total: 1,415
  - Density: 28.5/km^{2} (73.7/sq mi)
- Time zone: UTC+1 (CET)
  - Summer (DST): UTC+2 (CEST)
- Postal code: 48350 Đurđevac
- Website: ferdinandovac.hr

Ferdinandovac is a settlement and a municipality in the Koprivnica-Križevci County in Croatia.

== History ==
In the late 19th century and early 20th century, Ferdinandovac was part of the Bjelovar-Križevci County of the Kingdom of Croatia-Slavonia.

== Demographics ==
In 2021, the municipality had 1,415 residents in the following settlements:

- Brodić, population 63
- Ferdinandovac, population 1352
Ferdinandovac: Population trends 1857–2021
v

population	1093	1382	1780	3126	3272	3624	3779	3787	3467	3514	3268	2881	2497	2293	2107	1750	1415
	1857	1869	1880	1890	1900	1910	1921	1931	1948	1953	1961	1971	1981	1991	2001	2011	2021

Sources: Croatian Bureau of Statistics publications

=== Religion ===
Religion	Population	%
Catholics	1,346	95.13%
Other Christians	45	3.19%
Others	24	1.68%
Total	1,415	100%

== Administration ==
The current mayor of Ferdinandovac is Vjekoslav Maletić (Mreža) and the Ferdinandovac Municipal Council consists of 9 seats.

Groups	Councilors per group
Mreža-HSU	6 / 9
HDZ	3 / 9

== Culture ==
There are currently 10 cultural and sports associations operating in Ferdinandovac:

- Hunting Association "Pheasant"
- Sport Fishing Club "Pike"
- Women's Association
- Youth Association
- VFD Ferdinandovac
- Brotherhood of St. Ferdinand
- Ferdinandovac Pensioners' Association
- Croatian Cultural and Artistic Society "Frankopan"
- Association of Computer Scientists Ferdinandovac
- Association of Volunteers and Veterans of the Homeland War of the Republic of Croatia, Ferdinandovac Branch
