= Đelekovec =

- Municipality
- Interactive map of Đelekovec
- Location of Đelekovec in Croatia
- Coordinates: 46°15′0″N 16°52′12″E
- Country: Croatia
- County: Koprivnica-Križevci County

Government
  - Municipal Mayor: Lara Samošćanec (Grouping of electors)

Area
  - Municipality: 26.3 km^{2} (10.2 sq mi)
  - Urban: 17.5 km^{2} (6.8 sq mi)

Population (2021)
  - Municipality: 1,281
  - Density: 48.7/km^{2} (126/sq mi)
  - Urban: 990
  - Urban density: 57/km^{2} (150/sq mi)
- Time zone: UTC+1 (CET)
  - Summer (DST): UTC+2 (CEST)
- Postal code: 48316 Đelekovec
- Area code: +385 (0)48
- Website: delekovec.hr

Đelekovec is a municipality and a village in northern Croatia, located north of Koprivnica, near the Drava river.

== History ==
In the late 19th century and early 20th century, Ðelekovec was part of Varaždin County of the Kingdom of Croatia-Slavonia.

== Demographics ==
In 2021, the municipality had 1,281 residents in the following settlements:

- Đelekovec, population 990
- Imbriovec, population 291
Đelekovec: Population trends 1857–2021
v

population	1780	2003	2119	2405	2780	2822	2899	2973	2861	2870	2716	2404	2172	1953	1824	1533	1281
	1857	1869	1880	1890	1900	1910	1921	1931	1948	1953	1961	1971	1981	1991	2001	2011	2021

Sources: Croatian Bureau of Statistics publications

=== Ethnicity and Religion ===
Ethnicity	Population	%
Croats	1,227	95.78%
Romani	28	2.19%
Others	26	2.03%
Total	1,281	100%

Religion	Population	%
Catholics	1,134	88.52%
Other Christians	58	4.53%
Others	27	2.11%
Unaffiliated	30	2.34%
Undeclared	32	2.5%
Total	1,281	100%

== Administration ==
The current mayor of Đelekovec is Lara Samošćanec and the Đelekovec Municipal Council consists of 9 seats.

Groups	Councilors per group
Grouping of electors	7 / 9
HDZ	1 / 9
SDP	1 / 9

== Culture ==
There are currently 10 cultural and sports associations operating in Đelekovec:

- FC "OSVIT"
- FC "BORAC"
- Sport Fishing Club "ĐELEKOVEC"
- Hunting Association Fox
- VFD Đelekovec
- VFD Imbriovec
- Women's Association Đelekovec
- Women's Association "Rose" Imbriovec
- VENDI – Association for the Preservation of Natural and Cultural Heritage, Culture and Art and the Promotion of Rural tourism
- Pensioners' Association "VENDEKI" Đelekovec

== Education ==
- Kindergarten "Iskrica" Đelekovec
- Elementary School "Mihovil Pavlek Miškina" Đelekovec
