= Kalinovac =

- Interactive map of Kalinovac
- Location within Croatia
- Coordinates: 46°02′N 17°07′E
- Country: Croatia
- County: Koprivnica-Križevci County

Government
  - Mayor: Darko Sobota (HDZ)

Area
  - Total: 35.3 km^{2} (13.6 sq mi)

Population (2021)
  - Total: 1,297
  - Density: 36.7/km^{2} (95.2/sq mi)
- Time zone: UTC+1 (CET)
  - Summer (DST): UTC+2 (CEST)
- Postal code: 48350 Đurđevac
- Website: kalinovac.hr

Kalinovac is a settlement and a municipality in the Koprivnica-Križevci County in Croatia.

In the 2011 census, the municipality had a total of 1,297 inhabitants. Croats were an absolute majority at 98.69%.

== History ==
In the late 19th century and early 20th century, Kalinovac was part of the Bjelovar-Križevci County of the Kingdom of Croatia-Slavonia.

== Demographics ==
In 2021, the municipality had 1,297 residents in the following settlements:

- Batinske, population 69
- Kalinovac, population 1,194
- Molvice, population 34
Kalinovac: Population trends 1857–2021
v

population	1424	1827	2134	2589	2881	3080	2983	2944	2884	2951	2777	2506	2140	1852	1725	1597	1297
	1857	1869	1880	1890	1900	1910	1921	1931	1948	1953	1961	1971	1981	1991	2001	2011	2021

Sources: Croatian Bureau of Statistics publications

== Administration ==
The current mayor of Kalinovac is Darko Sobota (HDZ) and the Kalinovac Municipal Council consists of 9 seats.

Groups	Councilors per group
HDZ	9 / 9

== Notable people ==
- Josip Manolić (1920-2024), Yugoslav state security official and Croatian politician, first prime minister of independent Croatia (1991)
