= Novigrad Podravski =

- Interactive map of Novigrad Podravski
- Location within Croatia
- Coordinates: 46°05′N 16°57′E
- Country: Croatia
- County: Koprivnica-Križevci County

Government
  - Mayor: Zdravko Brljek (SDP)

Area
  - Total: 66.1 km^{2} (25.5 sq mi)

Population (2021)
  - Total: 2,300
  - Density: 35/km^{2} (90/sq mi)
- Time zone: UTC+1 (CET)
  - Summer (DST): UTC+2 (CEST)
- Website: novigrad-podravski.hr

Novigrad Podravski is a village and a municipality in the Koprivnica-Križevci County in Croatia.

In the 2021 census, there were a total of 2,300 inhabitants. Croats formed a majority at 92.48%.

== History ==
In the late 19th century and early 20th century, Novigrad Podravski was part of the Bjelovar-Križevci County of the Kingdom of Croatia-Slavonia.

== Demographics ==
In 2021, the municipality had 2,300 residents in the following 7 settlements:

- Borovljani, population 187
- Delovi, population 169
- Javorovac, population 57
- Novigrad Podravski, population 1577
- Plavšinac, population 126
- Srdinac, population 16
- Vlaislav, population 168
Novigrad Podravski: Population trends 1857–2021
v

population	4443	4782	5319	5621	5673	5670	5651	5412	4969	4970	4746	4373	3809	3329	3161	2872	2300
	1857	1869	1880	1890	1900	1910	1921	1931	1948	1953	1961	1971	1981	1991	2001	2011	2021

Sources: Croatian Bureau of Statistics publications

== Administration ==
The current mayor of Novigrad Podravski is Zdravko Brljek (SDP) and the Novigrad Podravski Municipal Council consists of 9 seats.

Groups	Councilors per group
SDP	5 / 9
Independents	2 / 9
HDZ	2 / 9

== Religion ==
Serbian Orthodox Church of Lazarus of the Four Days was built in the village of Plavšinac in 1758. Its iconostasis was painted by the Montenegrin painter Atanas Bocarić. Two of its icons are exhibited in the Museum of the Serbian Orthodox Church in Zagreb. Due to its cultural and architectural features building is classified as a protected cultural property.

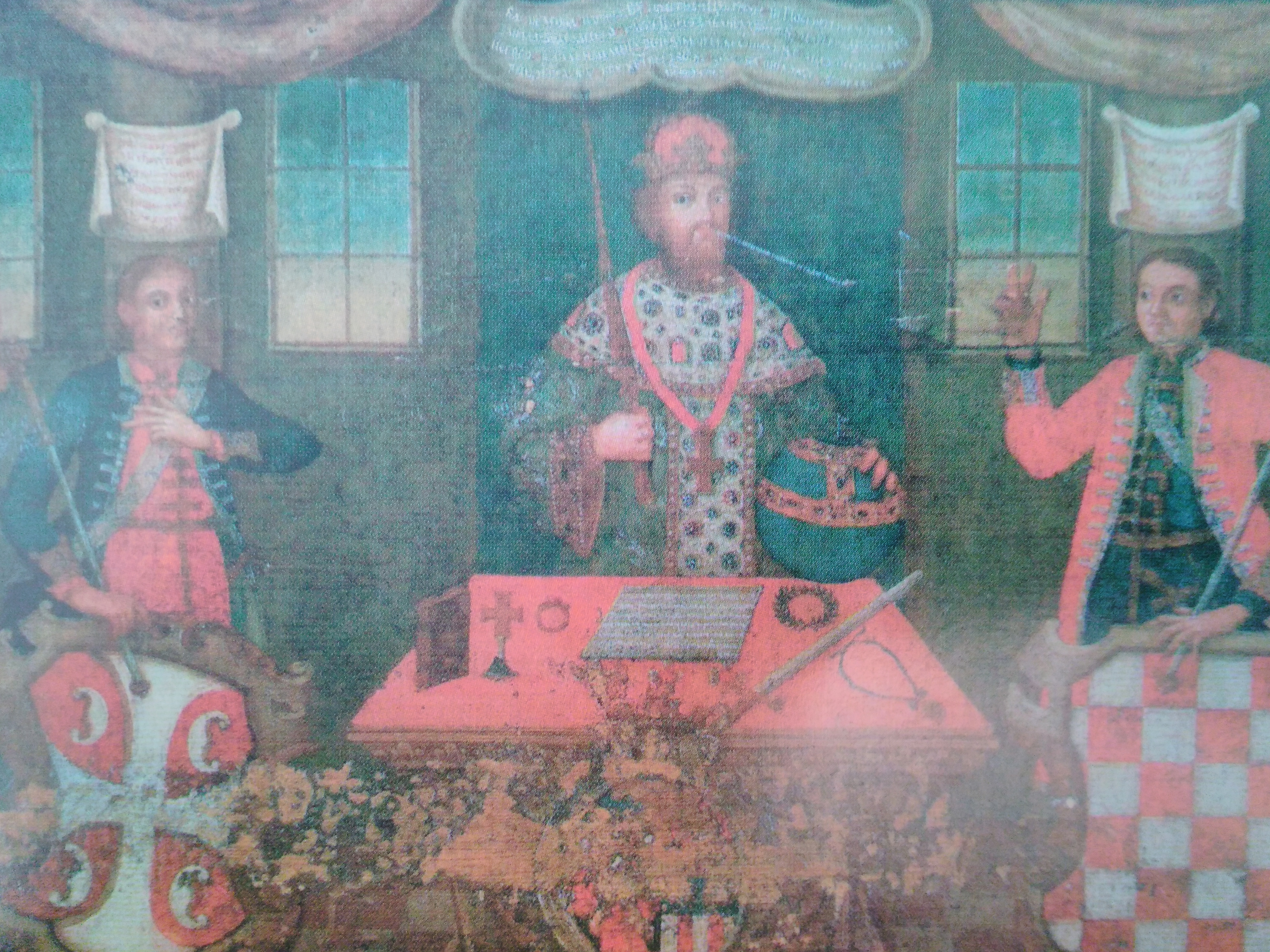

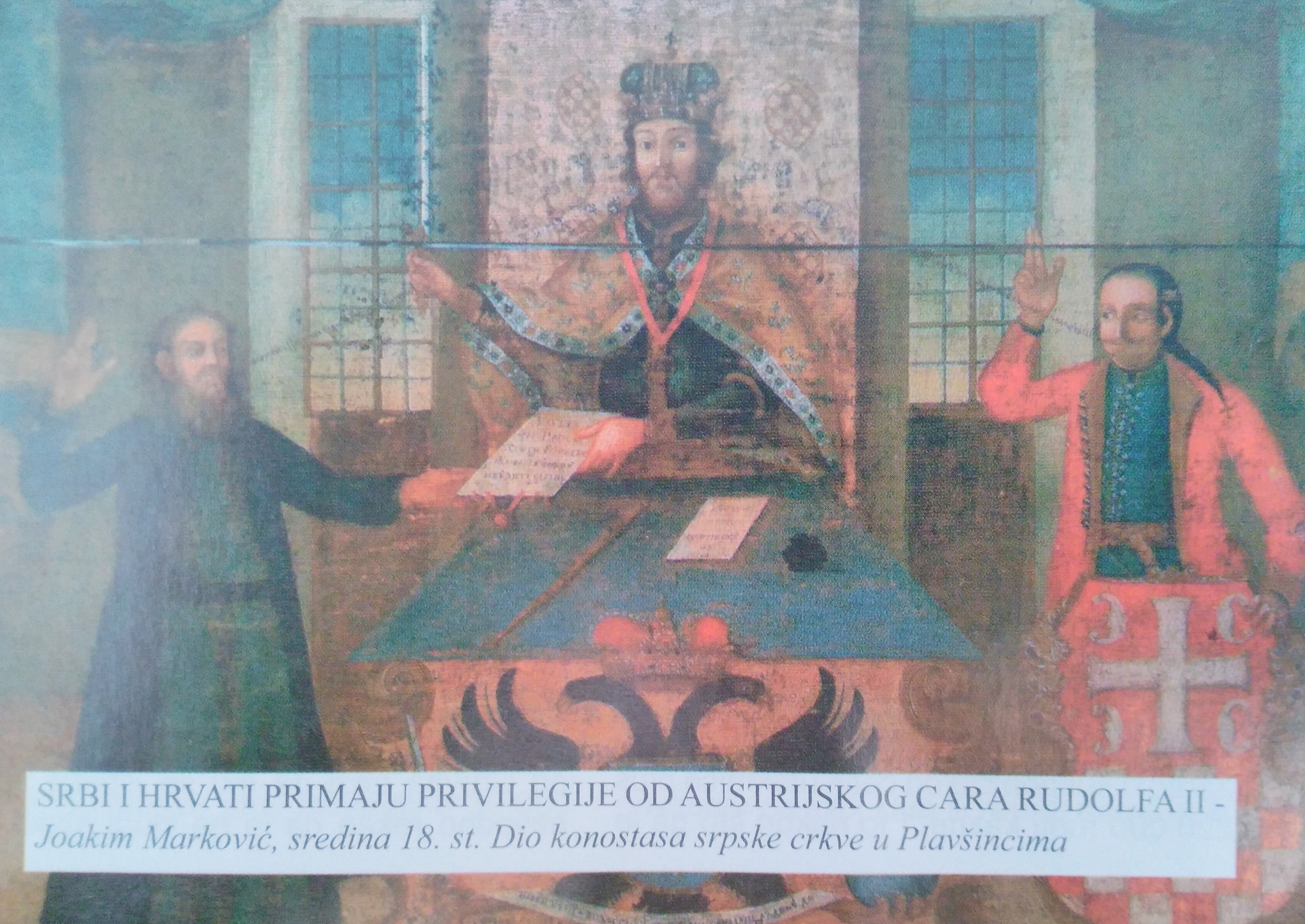
