= Podravske Sesvete =

- Interactive map of Podravske Sesvete
- Location within Croatia
- Coordinates: 46°00′N 17°13′E
- Country: Croatia
- County: Koprivnica-Križevci County

Government
  - Mayor: Marko Derežić (HDZ)

Area
  - Total: 29.1 km^{2} (11.2 sq mi)

Population (2021)
  - Total: 1,446
  - Density: 49.7/km^{2} (129/sq mi)
- Time zone: UTC+1 (CET)
  - Summer (DST): UTC+2 (CEST)
- Postal code: 48350 Đurđevac
- Website: podravske-sesvete.hr

Podravske Sesvete is a settlement and a municipality in the Koprivnica–Križevci County in Croatia.

In the 2021 census, there were 1,446 inhabitants, all in the settlement of Podravske Sesvete.

== History ==
In the late 19th century and early 20th century, Podravske Sesvete was part of the Bjelovar-Križevci County of the Kingdom of Croatia-Slavonia.

== Demographics ==
In 2021, the municipality had 1,446 residents in the following settlements:

- Podravske Sesvete, population 1,446
Podravske Sesvete: Population trends 1857–2021
v

population	1625	1802	2100	2371	2760	3355	3450	3291	2965	2902	2682	2510	2206	1957	1778	1630	1446
	1857	1869	1880	1890	1900	1910	1921	1931	1948	1953	1961	1971	1981	1991	2001	2011	2021

Sources: Croatian Bureau of Statistics publications

== Administration ==
The current mayor of Podravske Sesvete is Marko Derežić (HDZ) and the Podravske Sesvete Municipal Council consists of 9 seats.

Groups	Councilors per group
HNS	4 / 9
HDZ	3 / 9
Mreža	1 / 9
Krunoslav Bratanović	1 / 9
