= Koprivnički Ivanec =

- Interactive map of Koprivnički Ivanec
- Location within Croatia
- Coordinates: 46°12′N 16°49′E
- Country: Croatia
- County: Koprivnica-Križevci County

Government
  - Mayor: Zoran Vrabelj (Independent)

Area
  - City: 33.0 km^{2} (12.7 sq mi)
  - Urban: 18.4 km^{2} (7.1 sq mi)

Population (2021)
  - City: 1,798
  - Density: 54.5/km^{2} (141/sq mi)
  - Urban: 997
  - Urban density: 54.2/km^{2} (140/sq mi)
- Time zone: UTC+01:00 (CET)
  - Summer (DST): UTC+02:00 (CEST)
- Postal code: 48000 Koprivnica
- Website: koprivnicki-ivanec.hr

Koprivnički Ivanec is a settlement and a municipality in Koprivnica-Križevci County in Croatia.

In the 2021 census, there were a total of 1,798 inhabitants. Croats formed an absolute majority at 98.61%.

== History ==
In the late 19th century and 20th century, Koprivnički Ivanec was part of Varaždin County of the Kingdom of Croatia-Slavonia.

== Demographics ==
In 2021, the municipality had 1,798 residents in the following settlements:

- Botinovec, population 163
- Goričko, population 121
- Koprivnički Ivanec, population 997
- Kunovec, population 401
- Pustakovec, population 116
Koprivnički Ivanec: Population trends 1857–2021
v

population	2137	2419	2278	2679	2837	3107	2964	3509	3395	3429	3336	3107	2899	2574	2361	2121	1798
	1857	1869	1880	1890	1900	1910	1921	1931	1948	1953	1961	1971	1981	1991	2001	2011	2021

Sources: Croatian Bureau of Statistics publications

== Administration ==
The current mayor of Koprivnički Ivanec is Zoran Vrabelj and the Koprivnički Ivanec Municipal Council consists of 9 seats.

Groups	Councilors per group
Free Voters Group	6 / 9
DHSS	2 / 9
HDZ-DP	1 / 9
