= Novo Virje =

- Interactive map of Novo Virje
- Location within Croatia
- Coordinates: 46°5′54″N 17°9′18″E
- Country: Croatia
- County: Koprivnica-Križevci County

Government
  - Mayor: Mirko Remetović (Independent)

Area
  - Total: 36.2 km^{2} (14.0 sq mi)

Population (2021)
  - Total: 1,026
  - Density: 28.3/km^{2} (73.4/sq mi)
- Time zone: UTC+1 (CET)
  - Summer (DST): UTC+2 (CEST)
- Postal code: 48350 Đurđevac
- Website: novo-virje.hr

Novo Virje is a village and a municipality in the Koprivnica-Križevci county in Croatia.

In the 2021 census, there were a total of 1,026 inhabitants. Croats formed an absolute majority.

== History ==
In the late 19th century and early 20th century, Novo Virje was part of the Bjelovar-Križevci County of the Kingdom of Croatia-Slavonia.

== Demographics ==
In 2021, the municipality had 1,026 residents in the following settlements:

- Novo Virje, population 1,026
Novo Virje: Population trends 1857–2021
v

population				2228	2854	3121	3074	2944	2773	2719	2531	2182	1877	1601	1412	1216	1026
	1857	1869	1880	1890	1900	1910	1921	1931	1948	1953	1961	1971	1981	1991	2001	2011	2021

Sources: Croatian Bureau of Statistics publications

== Administration ==
The current mayor of Novo Virje is Mirko Remetović and the Novo Virje Municipal Council consists of 9 seats.

Groups	Councilors per group
Independents	7 / 9
HDZ-Mreža	2 / 9
