= Vladimir Šišljagić =

Croatian cardiac surgeon

Vladimir Šišljagić, born in 1957 in Osijek is Croatian cardiac surgeon and politician. Šišljagić is the leader of Croatian Democratic Alliance of Slavonia and Baranja, a regionalist and national conservative political party in Croatia.
