= Home and National Rally =

Croatian political party

Home and National Rally Dom i Nacionalno Okupljanje
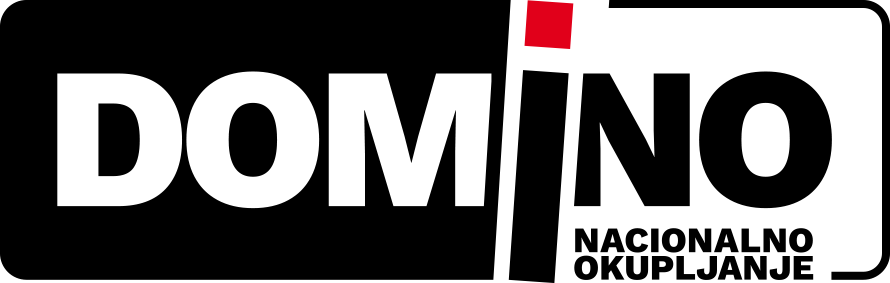
- Abbreviation: DOMiNO
- President: Mario Radić
- General Secretary: Slaven Dobrović
- Deputy President: Igor Peternel; Branka Lozo; Damir Biloglav
- Founder: Mario Radić
- Split from: Homeland Movement
- Headquarters: Petrova ulica 112, Zagreb
- Ideology: National conservatism; Right-wing populism
- Political position: Right-wing
- National affiliation: Vukovar Coalition (Note: Including HS, HSP and BLOK)
- European affiliation: European Conservatives and Reformists Party
- European Parliament group: European Conservatives and Reformists Group
- Colours: Black; White; Red
- Slogan: Crno na bijelo ("In black and white")
- Croatian Parliament: 3 / 151 (2%)
- European Parliament: 1 / 12 (8%)
- County Prefects: 0 / 21
- Mayors: 0 / 128

Website
- strankadomino.hr

Home and National Rally (Croatian: Dom i Nacionalno Okupljanje; abbr. DOMiNO) is a right-wing political party in Croatia. The party's first and current president is Mario Radić.

== History ==
=== Party Foundation ===
Home and National Rally was founded on September 28, 2024, after splitting from the Homeland Movement, following Radić's defeat in the party leadership elections to Ivan Penava. Mario Radić was chosen as party president, while Igor Peternel, Damir Biloglav, and Branka Lozo were chosen as deputy presidents, the latter of which was nominated as the party's presidential candidate in the 2024 election. Slaven Dobrović was chosen as general secretary, and Stephen Nikola Bartulica was chosen as international secretary.

On November 21, 2024, Mario Radić stated the party will no longer support Croatia's governing coalition as it had done since its founding.

== Party presidents ==
| No. | Name | Term of office |
|---|---|---|
| 1. | Mario Radić | 28 September 2024 – Incumbent |

== Election results ==
=== Presidential ===
| Election | Candidate | 1st round | | 2nd round | | Result |
| Election | Candidate | Votes | % | Votes | % | Result |
|---|---|---|---|---|---|---|
| 2024–25 | Branka Lozo | 39,321 | 2.41 (#7) | —N/a | | Lost |

== See also ==
- Homeland Movement
