= Croatian Democratic Alliance of Slavonia and Baranja =

Croatian Democratic Alliance of Slavonia and Baranja Hrvatski demokratski savez Slavonije i Baranje
- Leader: Vladimir Šišljagić
- Founder: Branimir Glavaš
- Founded: 6 May 2006
- Headquarters: Osijek, Croatia
- Ideology: Slavonian regionalism; National conservatism; Green conservatism
- Political position: Centre-right
- Colours: Red; Gold
- Sabor: 0 / 151
- European Parliament: 0 / 12
- County Prefects: 0 / 21
- Mayors: 0 / 128

Website
- www.hdssb.hr

Croatian Democratic Alliance of Slavonia and Baranja (Croatian: Hrvatski demokratski savez Slavonije i Baranje or HDSSB) is a regionalist, National conservative political party in the Eastern Croatian region of Slavonia. Until 2015, the HDSSB was considered right-wing populist.

It was formally founded on 6 May 2006, but had its origins one year earlier, when the group of local Croatian Democratic Union (HDZ) politicians, led by War of Independence veteran Branimir Glavaš, launched a political organisation with a very similar name, the Croatian Democratic Assembly of Slavonia and Baranja (Croatian: Hrvatski demokratski sabor Slavonije i Baranje) at the eve of May 2005 local elections. The stated aim of new group was the regional reorganisation of Croatia in order to improve conditions in Slavonia, which was - according to Glavaš and his supporters - neglected by central government in Zagreb.

The HDZ leadership under Ivo Sanader denounced that platform and ejected Glavaš out of the party. However, most of the local HDZ organisation followed Glavaš and his independent election ticket that won a relative majority in the Osijek-Baranja County and City of Osijek assemblies. That group of independents became the HDSSB on 6 May 2006. In the 2007 Croatian parliamentary election they received 44,552 votes or 1.8% of the electorate, and won 3 seats in the Croatian Parliament. They improved their position in Croatian Parliament in next election by winning 6 seats.

In 2014, HDSSB became part of the Alliance for Croatia coalition, which was dissolved in 2015. In 2015, Glavaš stepped down as leader of the HDSSB and was succeeded by Vladimir Šišljagić. Following leadership change, the party shifted away ideologically from Right-wing populism towards National conservatism and Green conservatism.

== Electoral history ==
=== Legislative ===
Election	In coalition with	Votes won (coalition totals)	Percentage	Seats won	Change
2007	None	44,552	1.8%	3 / 151	▲3
2011	None	68,995	3.0%	6 / 151	▲3
2015	None	30,443	1.36%	2 / 151	▼4
2016	HKS	23,573	1.25%	1 / 151	▼1
2020	HDZ	621,008	37.26%	1 / 151	Steady

=== European Parliament ===
Election	In coalition with	Votes won (coalition totals)	Percentage	Seats won	Change
2013	HDSSD-ZH	22,328	3.01%	0 / 12	Steady
2014	Alliance for Croatia	63,437	6.88%	0 / 11	Steady
