= Peteranec =

- Interactive map of Peteranec
- Location within Croatia
- Coordinates: 46°12′N 16°53′E
- Country: Croatia
- County: Koprivnica-Križevci County

Government
  - Mayor: Ivan Derdić (Independent)

Area
  - Total: 51.8 km^{2} (20.0 sq mi)

Population (2021)
  - Total: 2,300
  - Density: 44/km^{2} (110/sq mi)
- Time zone: UTC+1 (CET)
  - Summer (DST): UTC+2 (CEST)
- Postal code: 48316 Đelekovec
- Website: peteranec.hr

Peteranec is a village and a municipality in the Koprivnica-Križevci County in Croatia.

In the 2021 census, the total population was 2,300.

== History ==
Eneolithic artefacts dated to 3500–3200 BC have been found in the locality of Seče, south of Peteranec, and termed the Seče culture.

In the late 19th and early 20th century, Peteranec was part of the Bjelovar-Križevci County of the Kingdom of Croatia-Slavonia.

== Demographics ==
In 2021, the municipality had 2,300 residents in the following 3 settlements:

- Komatnica, population 44
- Peteranec, population 1,240
- Sigetec, population 1,016
Peteranec: Population trends 1857–2021
v

population	4064	4313	4205	4432	4651	4725	4515	4456	4104	4020	3904	3485	3199	2954	2848	2704	2300
	1857	1869	1880	1890	1900	1910	1921	1931	1948	1953	1961	1971	1981	1991	2001	2011	2021

Sources: Croatian Bureau of Statistics publications

== Administration ==
The current mayor of Peteranec is Ivan Derdić (Free Voters Group) and the Peteranec Municipal Council consists of 9 seats.

Groups	Councilors per group
Free Voters Group	7 / 9
HDZ	2 / 9
