= Koprivnica-Križevci County =

County in northern Croatia

Coordinates: 46.170°N 16.909°E

Koprivnica-Križevci County Koprivničko-križevačka županija (Croatian)
- County
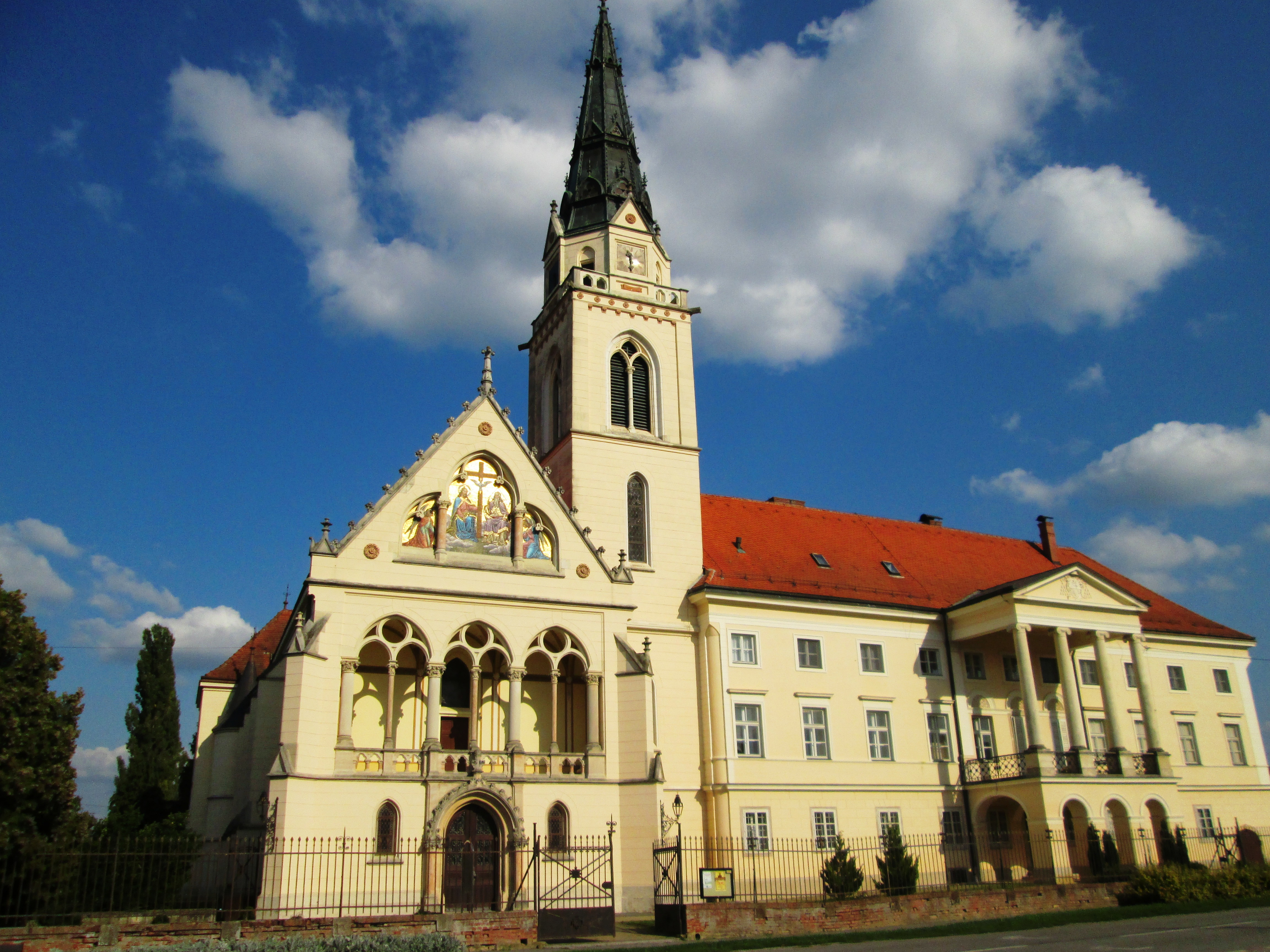
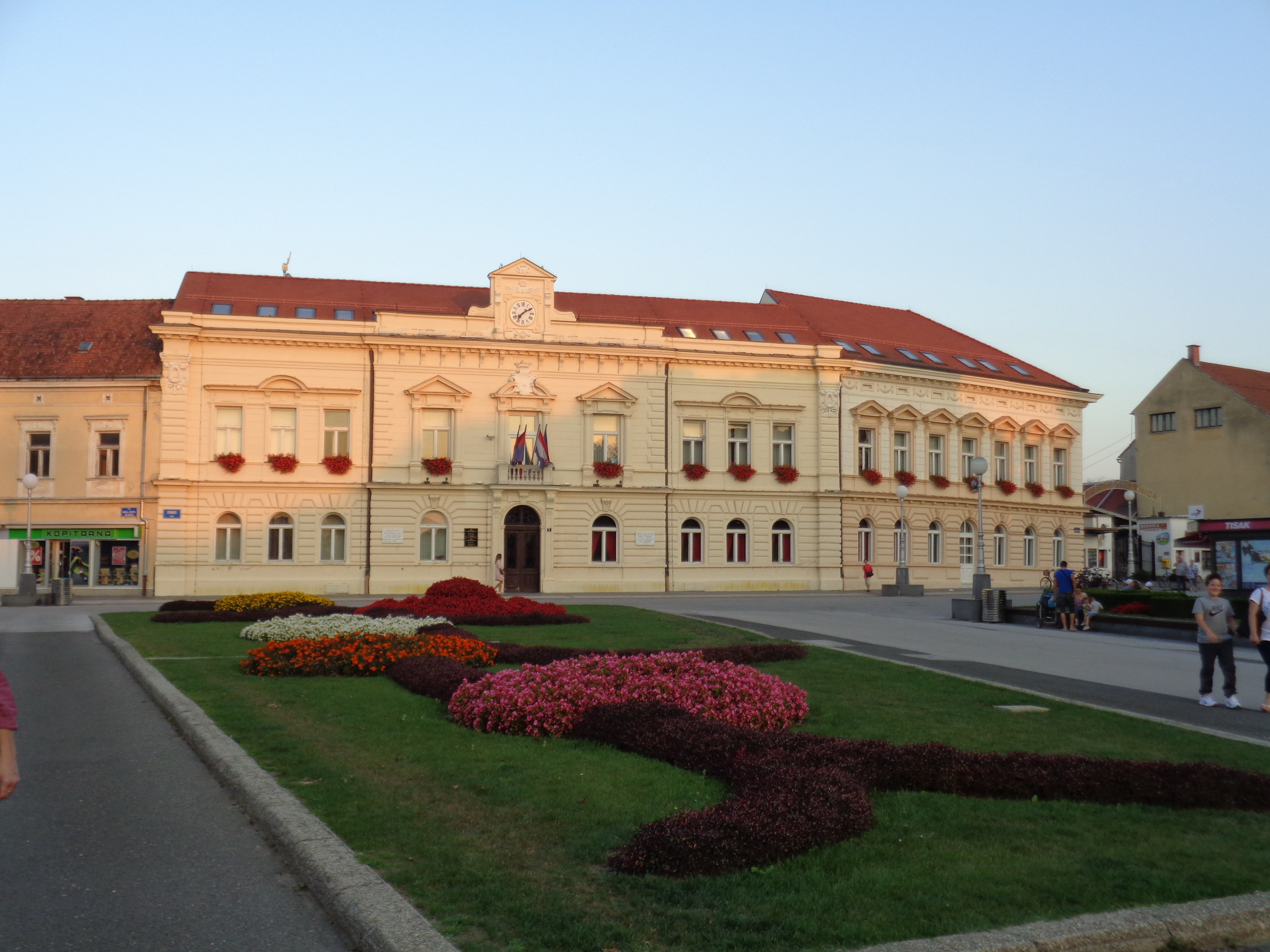
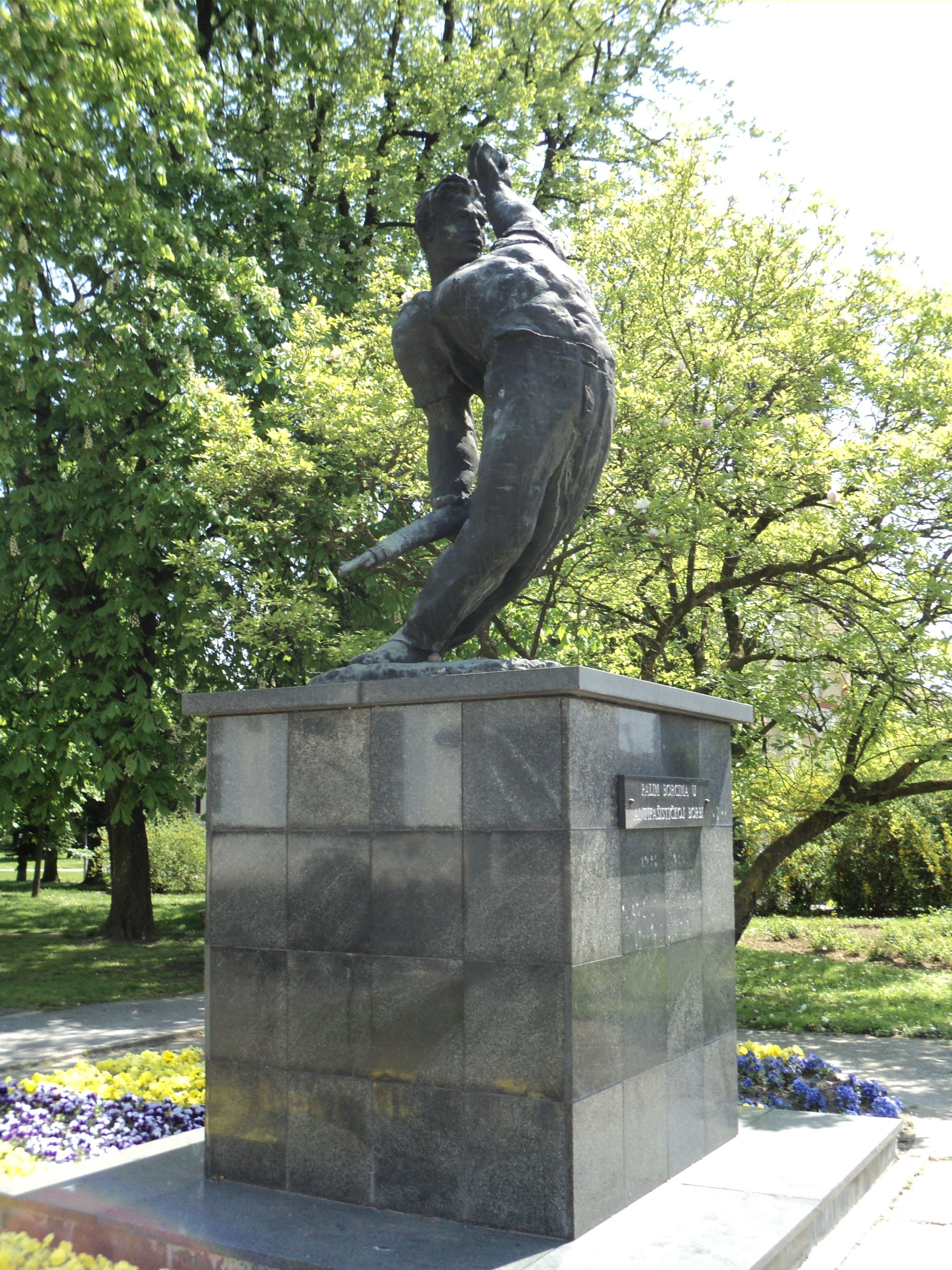
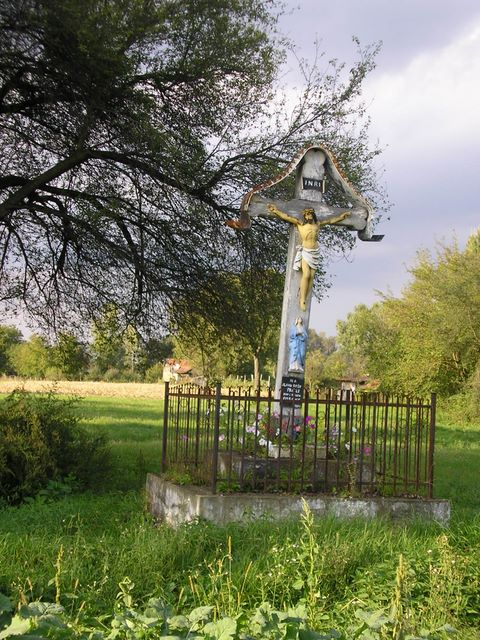
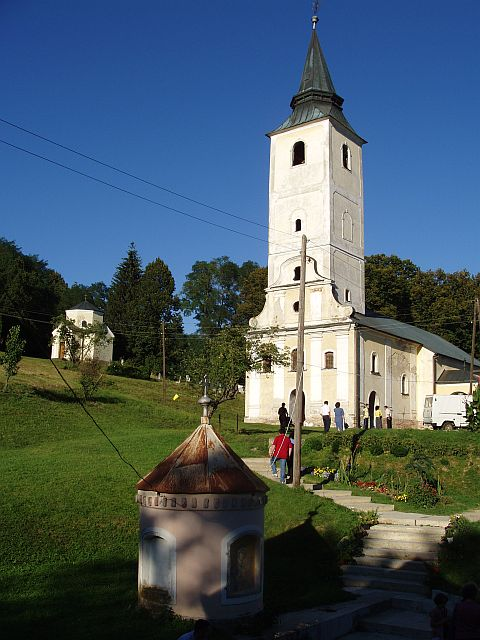
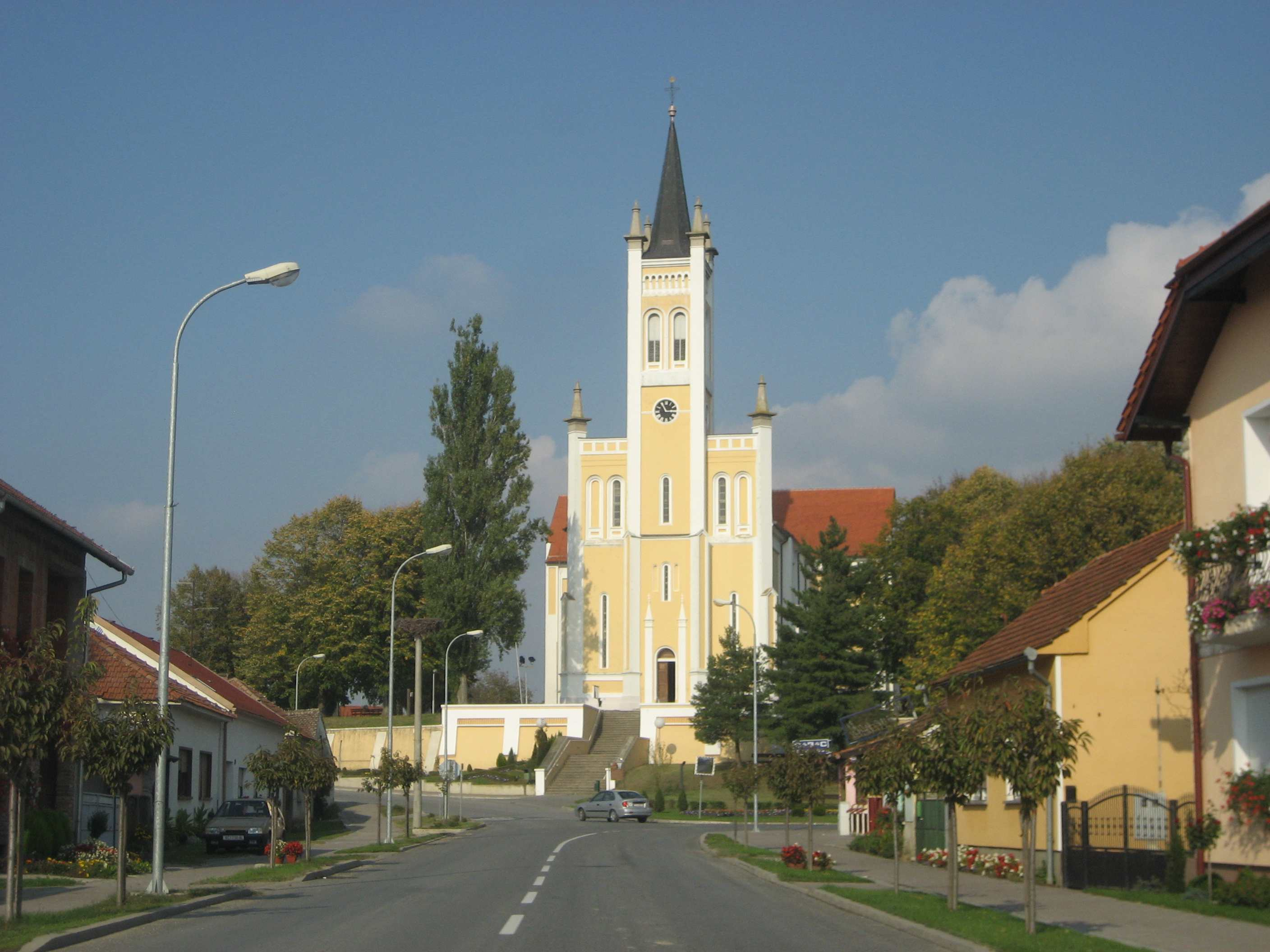
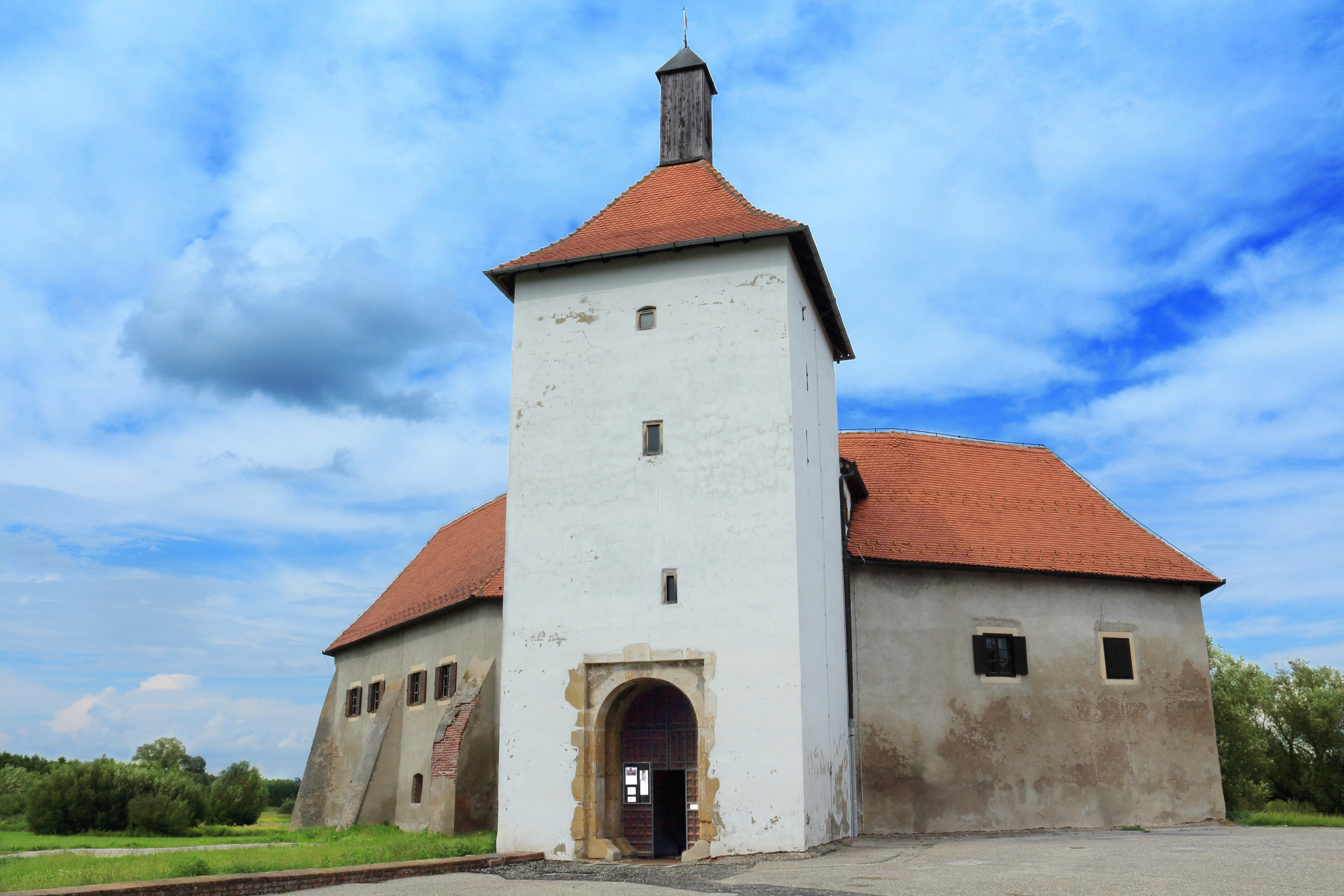
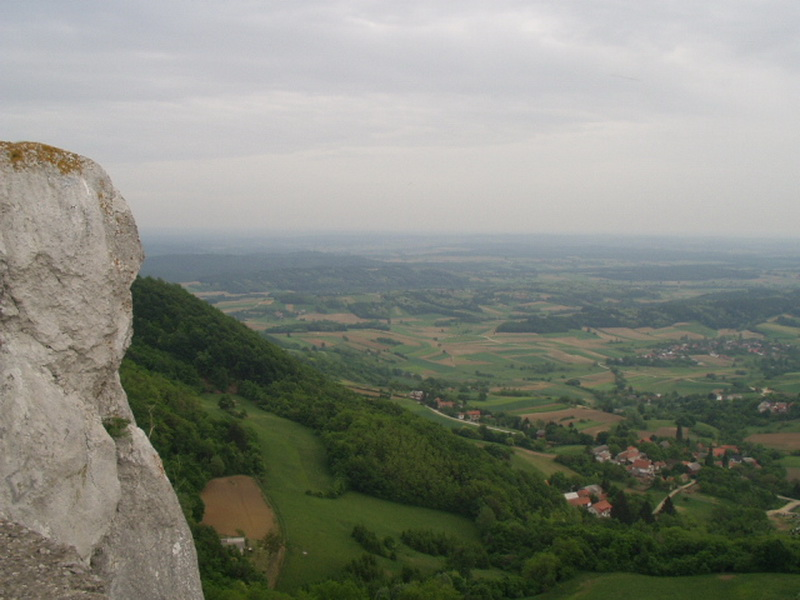

- Flag Coat of arms

- Koprivnica-Križevci County within Croatia
- Country: Croatia
- County seat: Koprivnica

Government
  - Župan (Prefect): Tomislav Golubić (SDP)
  - Assembly: 37 members

Area
  - Total: 1,748 km^{2} (675 sq mi)

Population (2021)
  - Total: 101,221
  - Density: 57.91/km^{2} (150.0/sq mi)
- Area code: 048
- ISO 3166 code: HR-06
- HDI (2022): 0.847 very high · 13th
- Website: www.kckzz.hr

Koprivnica-Križevci County (Croatian: Koprivničko-križevačka županija [kǒpriːʋnit͡ʃko-krǐːʒeʋat͡ʃkaː ʒupǎnija]; Hungarian: Kapronca-Kőrös megye) is a county in Northern Croatia. Its hyphenated name comes from two entities: the two of its largest cities, Koprivnica and Križevci; Koprivnica is the official capital of the county.

The county also includes a third town, Đurđevac, but its population is much smaller than the main two (7,378 in 2021).

The Koprivnica-Križevci County borders on the Međimurje County in the north, Varaždin County in the northwest, Zagreb County in the southwest, Bjelovar-Bilogora County in the south, Virovitica-Podravina County in the southeast and Hungary in the east.

== History ==
Koprivnica was first mentioned in 1272 in a document by prince Ladislaus IV of Hungary and was declared a free royal town by king Ludovic I in 1356. It has flourished as a trading place and a military fortress since that time.

The military aspect set it back when it was included in the Croatian Military Frontier in the 16th century during the wars with the Ottoman Turks. After Maria Theresa's decree of 1765, however, it resumed life as a peaceful little merchant town.

Koprivnica developed significantly in the 20th century with the advent of the Podravka food industry, and is known worldwide for its Vegeta spice.

Križevci, on the other hand, as a smaller city and second mentioned in the county name, may seem like an underdog to its neighbour Koprivnica. Its first mention was from 1193 by Béla III but it was divided into two parts which developed at different rates.

After centuries of division, empress Maria Theresa united the Lower and Upper Križevac into Križevci in 1752. The town was also hit by the wars with the Turks, but it regained importance in 1871 when the railway was built through it on the way from Budapest to Rijeka.

Modern Križevci is oriented towards entrepreneurship, while preserving its eight beautiful churches (one of which is a cathedral), built mostly in the Middle Ages.

== Administrative division ==
Koprivnica-Križevci county is divided into:

- City of Koprivnica (county seat)
- Town of Križevci
- Town of Đurđevac
- Municipality of Drnje
- Municipality of Đelekovec
- Municipality of Ferdinandovac
- Municipality of Gola
- Municipality of Gornja Rijeka
- Municipality of Hlebine
- Municipality of Kalinovac
- Municipality of Kalnik
- Municipality of Kloštar Podravski
- Municipality of Koprivnički Bregi
- Municipality of Koprivnički Ivanec
- Municipality of Legrad
- Municipality of Molve
- Municipality of Novigrad Podravski
- Municipality of Novo Virje
- Municipality of Peteranec
- Municipality of Podravske Sesvete
- Municipality of Rasinja
- Municipality of Sokolovac
- Municipality of Sveti Ivan Žabno
- Municipality of Sveti Petar Orehovec
- Municipality of Virje

== Demographics ==
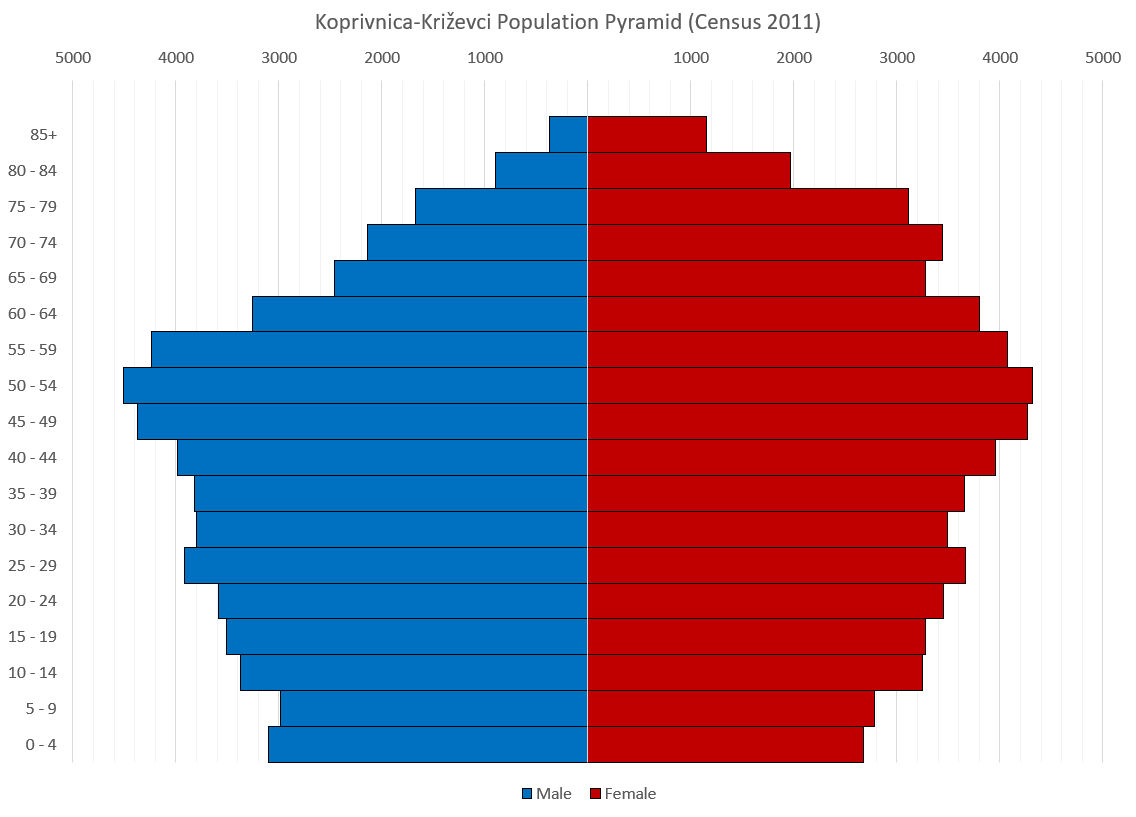
Population pyramid of Koprivnica-Križevci County per 2011 Census.

Historical populations of Koprivnica-Križevci County

Year	Pop.	±%
1857	87,464	—
1869	97,581	+11.6%
1880	105,529	+8.1%
1890	121,772	+15.4%
1900	132,581	+8.9%
1910	142,546	+7.5%
1921	139,054	−2.4%
1931	143,268	+3.0%
1948	140,565	−1.9%

Year	Pop.	±%
1953	142,362	+1.3%
1961	143,019	+0.5%
1971	138,994	−2.8%
1981	133,790	−3.7%
1991	129,397	−3.3%
2001	124,467	−3.8%
2011	115,584	−7.1%
2021	101,221	−12.4%

Source: Naselja i stanovništvo Republike Hrvatske 1857–2001, Croatian Bureau of Statistics, Zagreb, 2005

As of the 2021 census, the county had 101,221 residents. The population density is 58 people per km^{2}.

Koprivnica-Križevci County: Population trends 1857–2021
v

population	87464	97581	105529	121772	132581	142546	139054	143268	140565	142362	143019	138994	133790	129397	124467	115584	101221
	1857	1869	1880	1890	1900	1910	1921	1931	1948	1953	1961	1971	1981	1991	2001	2011	2021

Sources: Croatian Bureau of Statistics publications

== Administration ==
The current prefect of the Koprivnica-Križevci County is Tomislav Golubić and the county assembly consists of 37 seats.

Groups	Members per group
SDP-HSS-HSLS	14 / 37
Independents-HSU-HNS-DOMiNO-Most	9 / 37
HDZ-DP-HDS	8 / 37
Mreža	4 / 37
Independents	2 / 37
