= Minority languages of Croatia =

Languages of Croatia
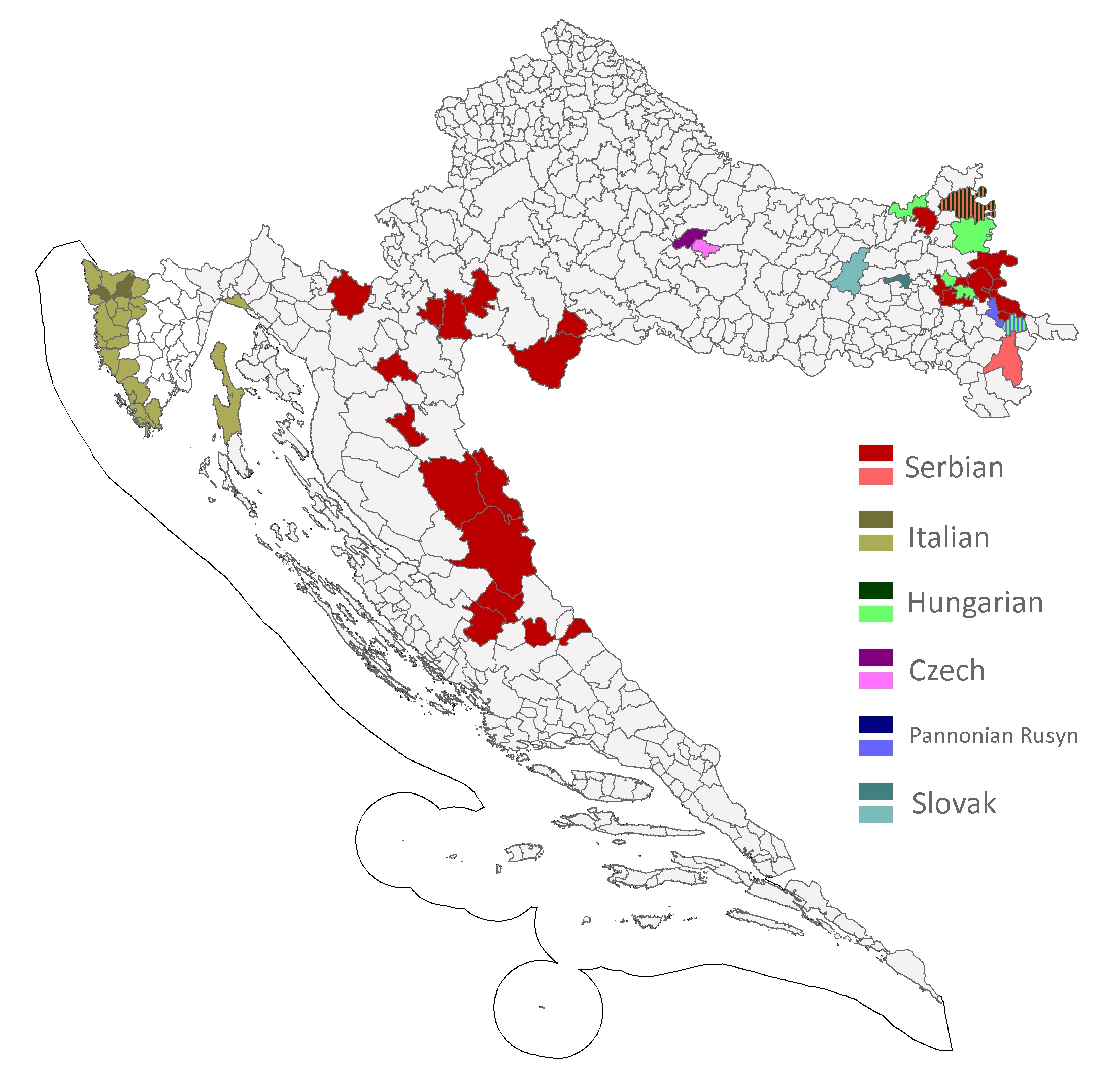
- Map of municipalities with official minority languages
- Minority: Czech; Hungarian; Italian; Pannonian Rusyn; Serbian; Slovak

The Constitution of Croatia in its preamble defines Croatia as a nation state of ethnic Croats, a country of traditionally present communities that the constitution recognizes as national minorities and a country of all its citizens. National minorities explicitly enumerated and recognized in the Constitution are Serbs, Czechs, Slovaks, Italians, Hungarians, Jews, Germans, Austrians, Ukrainians, Rusyns, Bosniaks, Slovenes, Montenegrins, Macedonians, Russians, Bulgarians, Poles, Romani, Romanians, Istro-Romanians, Turks ("Vlachs"), and Albanians. Article 12 of the constitution states that the official language in Croatia is Croatian, but also states that in some local governments another language and Cyrillic or some other script can be introduced in official use.

The official use of minority languages is defined by relevant national legislation and international conventions and agreements which Croatia signed. The most important national laws are Constitutional Act on the Rights of National Minorities, Law on Use of Languages and Scripts of National Minorities and Law on Education in Language and Script of National Minorities. Relevant international agreements are European Charter for Regional or Minority Languages and Framework Convention for the Protection of National Minorities. Certain rights were achieved through bilateral agreements and international agreements such as Treaty of Osimo and Erdut Agreement.

The required 33.3% of the minority population in certain local government units for obligatory introduction of official use of minority languages is considered high, taking into account that The Advisory Committee on the Framework Convention for the Protection of National Minorities of the Council of Europe considers a threshold from 10% to 20% reasonable. Croatia does not always show favorable views on issues of minority rights but Croatian European Union accession process positively influenced public usage of minority languages.

== Official minority languages ==
=== Serbian ===
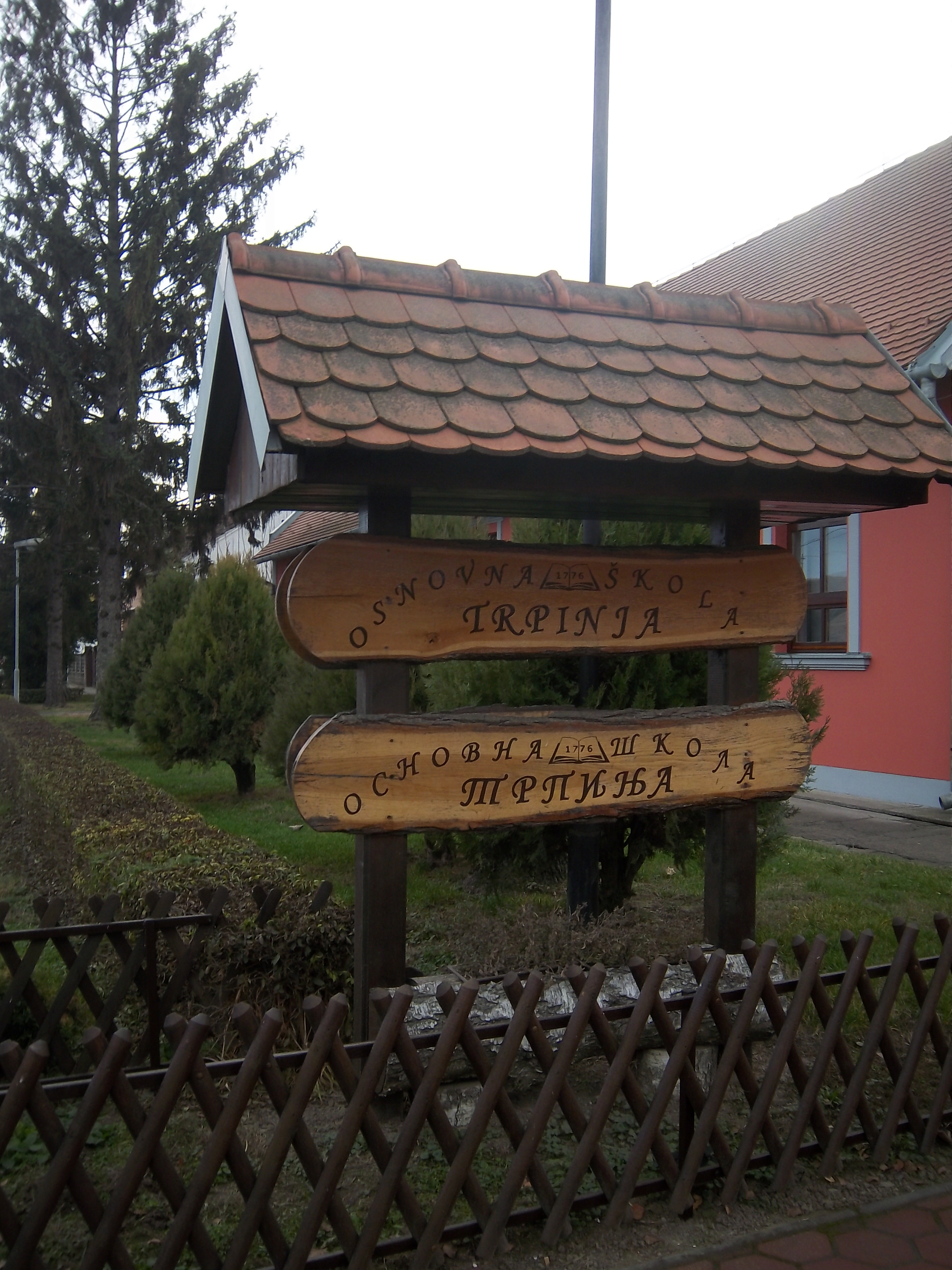
bi-lingual plate in front of the school in Trpinja

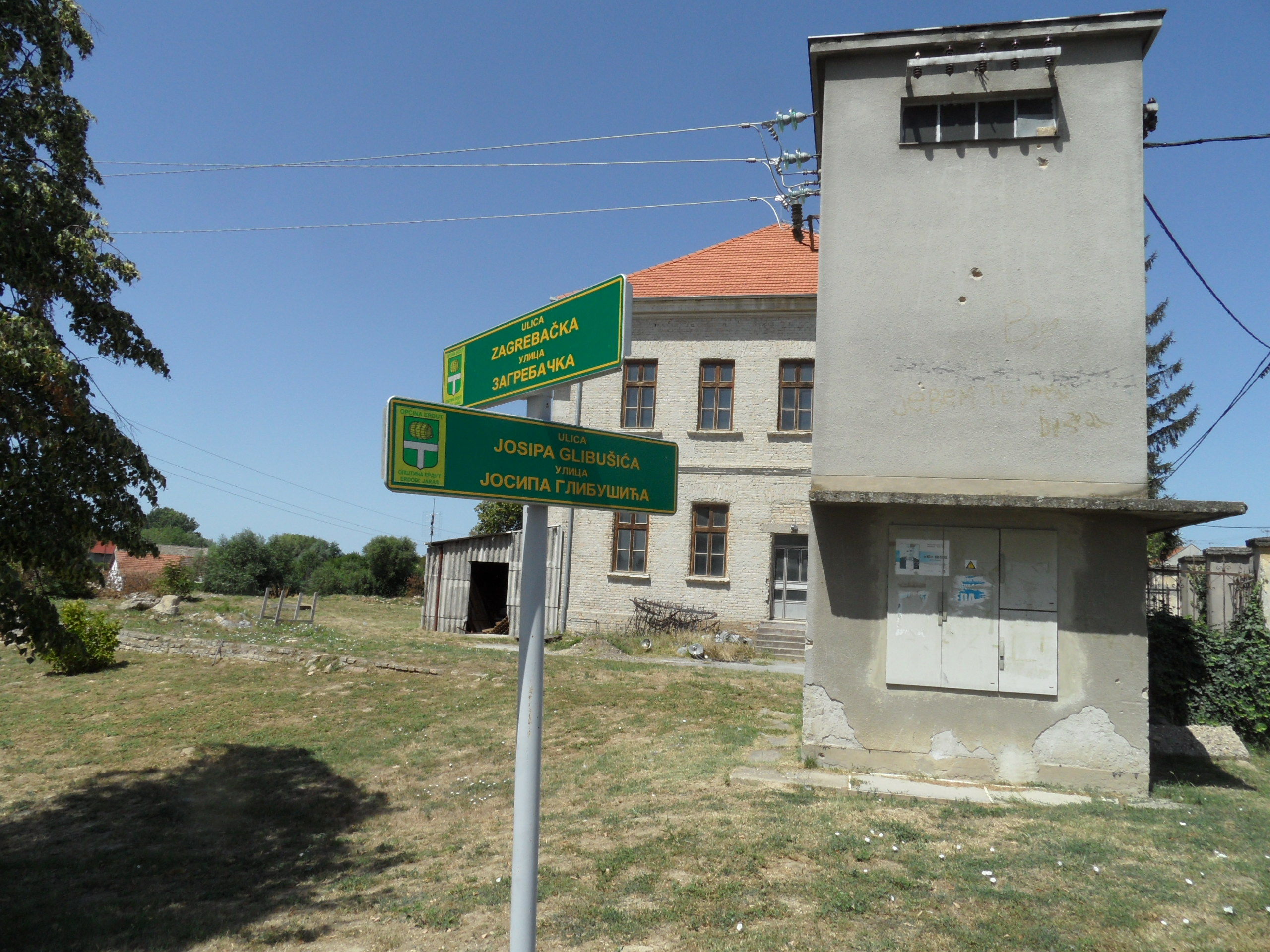
Bilingual street sign in Croatian and Serbian in Dalj, eastern Croatia

Education in Serbian is primarily offered in the area of former Eastern Slavonia, Baranja and Western Syrmia based on Erdut Agreement. With those school since 2005 there is also Kantakuzina Katarina Branković Serbian Orthodox Secondary School in Zagreb.

Serb National Council publish weekly magazine Novosti since December 1999. There are also monthly magazines Identitet, published by Serb Democratic Forum, Izvor, published by Joint Council of Municipalities, youth magazine Bijela Pčela and culture magazine Prosvjeta, both published by Prosvjeta and Forum published by Serb National Council from Vukovar. There are also three local radio stations in Serbian in eastern Slavonia such as Radio Borovo. Since 1996 Central library of Prosvjeta works as the official Central Library of Serbs in Croatia as well. Prosvjeta's library was established on 4 January 1948 and at that time it had 40,000 volumes mostly in national literature including most of the books from XVIII and XIX century. In 1953 authorities made a decision to close the library and to deposit its books in Museum of Serbs of Croatia, National and University Library in Zagreb and Yugoslav Academy of Sciences and Arts. Library was reestablished in January 1995 and until 2016 it included more than 25,000 volumes in its collection.

Department of South Slavic languages at the Faculty of Humanities and Social Sciences at the University of Zagreb has a The Chair of Serbian and Montenegrin literature. Among the others, lecturers of Serbian literature at the university over the time were Antun Barac, Đuro Šurmin and Armin Pavić.

==== Controversies ====
In the first years after introduction of new Constitutional Act on the Rights of National Minorities some local governments resisted implementation of its legal obligations. In 2005 Ombudsman report, municipalities of Vojnić, Krnjak, Gvozd, Donji Kukuruzari, Dvor and Korenica were mentioned as those that do not allow the official use of Serbian, although the national minority in these places meets the threshold provided for in the Constitutional Act. The report pointed out that Serbian minority in Vukovar can not use Serbian although minority constituted less than one percent less population than it was prescribed by law. After 2011 Croatian census Serbs of Vukovar meet the required proportion of population for co-official introduction of Serbian but it led to Anti-Cyrillic protests in Croatia. In April 2015 United Nations Human Rights Committee urged Croatia to ensure the right of minorities to use their language and alphabet. Committee report stated that particularly concerns the use of Serbian Cyrillic in the town of Vukovar and municipalities concerned. The Constitutional Court of Croatia upheld the legislation on the use of minority languages. It relied on a newly developed concept of national identity.

=== Italian ===
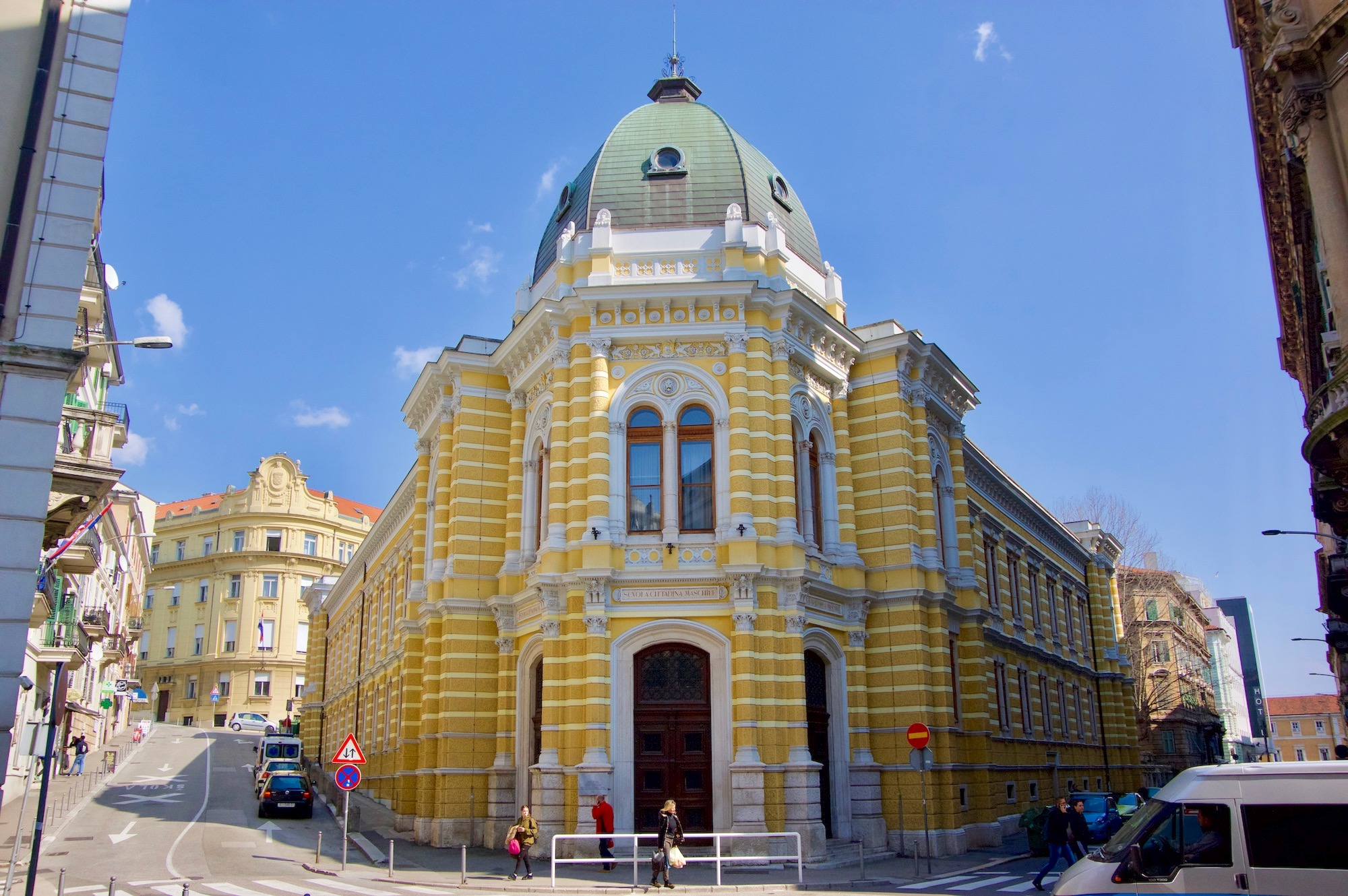
Italian Secondary School in Rijeka

The Italian language is an official minority language in Croatia, with many schools and public announcements published in both languages. Croatia's proximity and cultural connections to Italy have led to a relatively large presence of Italians in Croatia. Italians were recognized as a state minority in the Croatian Constitution in two sections: Istrian Italians and Dalmatian Italians. Their numbers drastically decreased following the Istrian–Dalmatian exodus (1943–1960).

Italian minority has realized much greater rights on bilingualism than other minority communities in Croatia. La Voce del Popolo is an Italian-language daily newspaper published by EDIT (EDizioni ITaliane) in the city of Rijeka. Central Library of Italians in Croatia operates as a section of Public library in Pula.

Even though today only 0.43% of the total population is Italian by citizenship, many more are ethnically Italian and a large percentage of Croatians speak Italian, in addition to Croatian. An estimated 14% of Croats speak Italian as a second language, which is one of the highest percentages in the European Union.

=== Hungarian ===
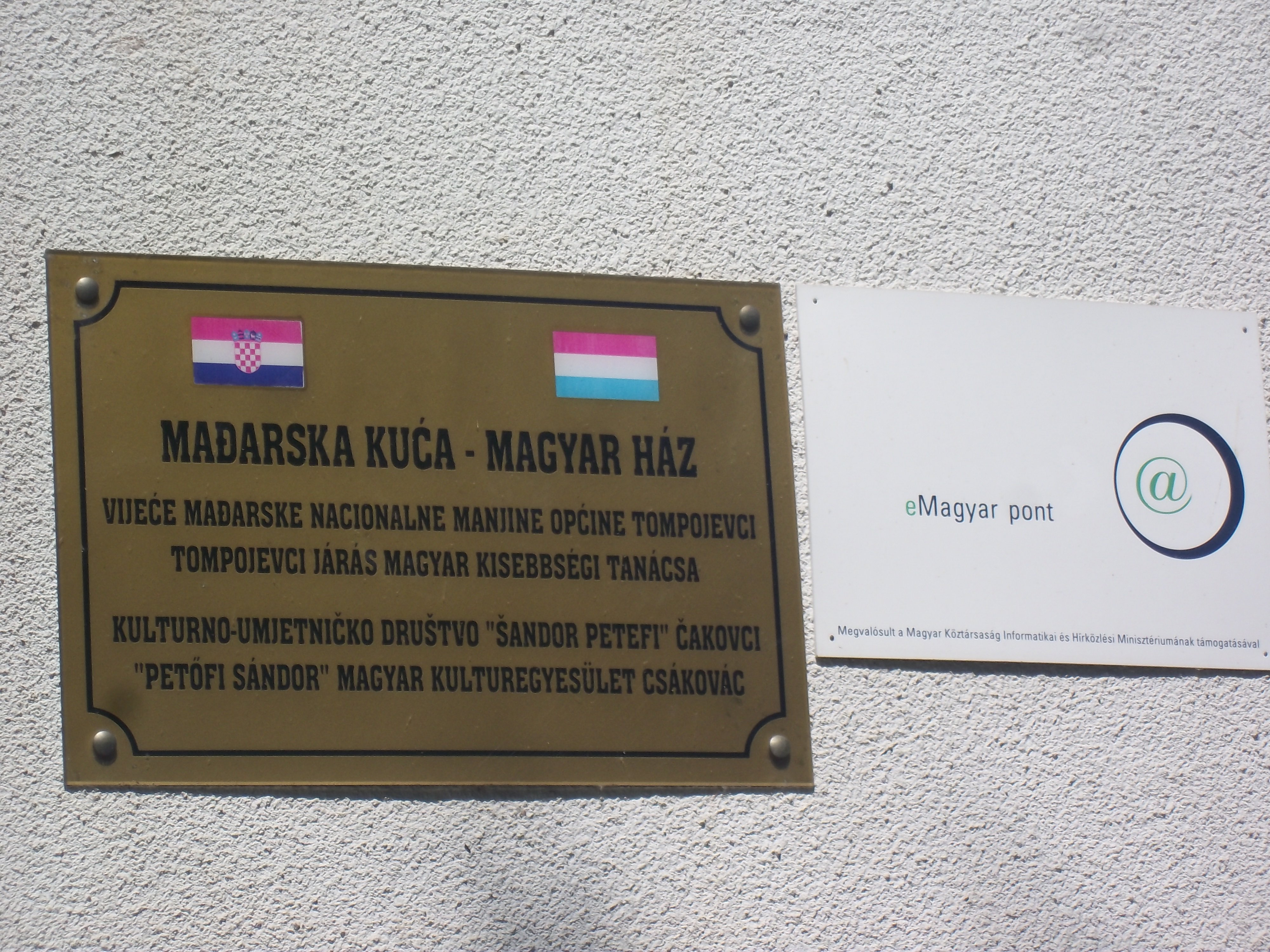
Inscription on the Hungarian House in Čakovci in Vukovar-Syrmia County.

In 2004, the Hungarian minority asked for introduction of Hungarian language in town of Beli Manastir as an official language, referring to the rights acquired prior to 1991. Hungarian minority at that time constituted 8,5% of town population. Central Library of Hungarians in Croatia operates as a section of Public library in Beli Manastir.

=== Czech ===
6,287 declared Czechs live in Bjelovar-Bilogora County. 70% of them stated that their native language is Czech. Ambassador of Czech Republic in Croatia stated that intention to limit usage of Serbian Cyrillic would negatively affect Czechs and other minorities in Croatia. Central Library of Czechs in Croatia operates as a section of Public library in Daruvar. In an interview in 2011 Zdenka Čuhnil, MP for the Czech and Slovak minorities, stated that Czech minority, based on its acquired rights, have the legal right to use its language in 9 local units (municipalities or towns) while in practice usage of that right is enabled only in one unit and partially in one more. She also stated that in the case of Slovak minority out of 6 units (5 based on acquired rights and one on the basis of proportionality) is free to use its rights only in one.

=== Slovak ===
In 2011 there was 11 elementary schools in which students from Slovak minority were able to learn Slovak. Those schools were located in Ilok, Osijek, Soljani, Josipovac Punitovački, Markovac Našički, Jelisavac, Miljevci, Zdenci, Lipovljani and Međurić. Gymnasium in Požega was the first high school in Croatia to introduce Slovak-language education into its elective curriculum. Union of Slovaks in cooperation with the Slovak Cultural Center in Našice publish the magazine Prameň in Slovak. On the 200th anniversary of birth of Štefan Moyses in 1997 Croatian branch of Matica slovenská set a bilingual memorial plate at the building of the Gornji Grad Gymnasium in Zagreb. In 2003 second bilingual plate commemorating the work of Martin Kukučín was set up in Lipik. Matica slovenská in Zagreb published more than 10 books in Slovak over the years. In 1998 Central Library of Slovaks in Croatia was established as a section of Public library in Našice and as of 2016 its users had access to more than 4,000 volumes.

=== Rusyn ===
Central Library of Rusyns and Ukrainians in Croatia operates as a section of Public libraries in Zagreb. Library was established on 9 December 1995 and today part of its collection is accessible in public libraries in Vinkovci, Lipovljani, Slavonski Brod, Vukovar and Petrovci.

=== German ===
Central Library of Austrians and Germans in Croatia operates as a section of Public library in Osijek.

=== Yiddish and Hebrew ===
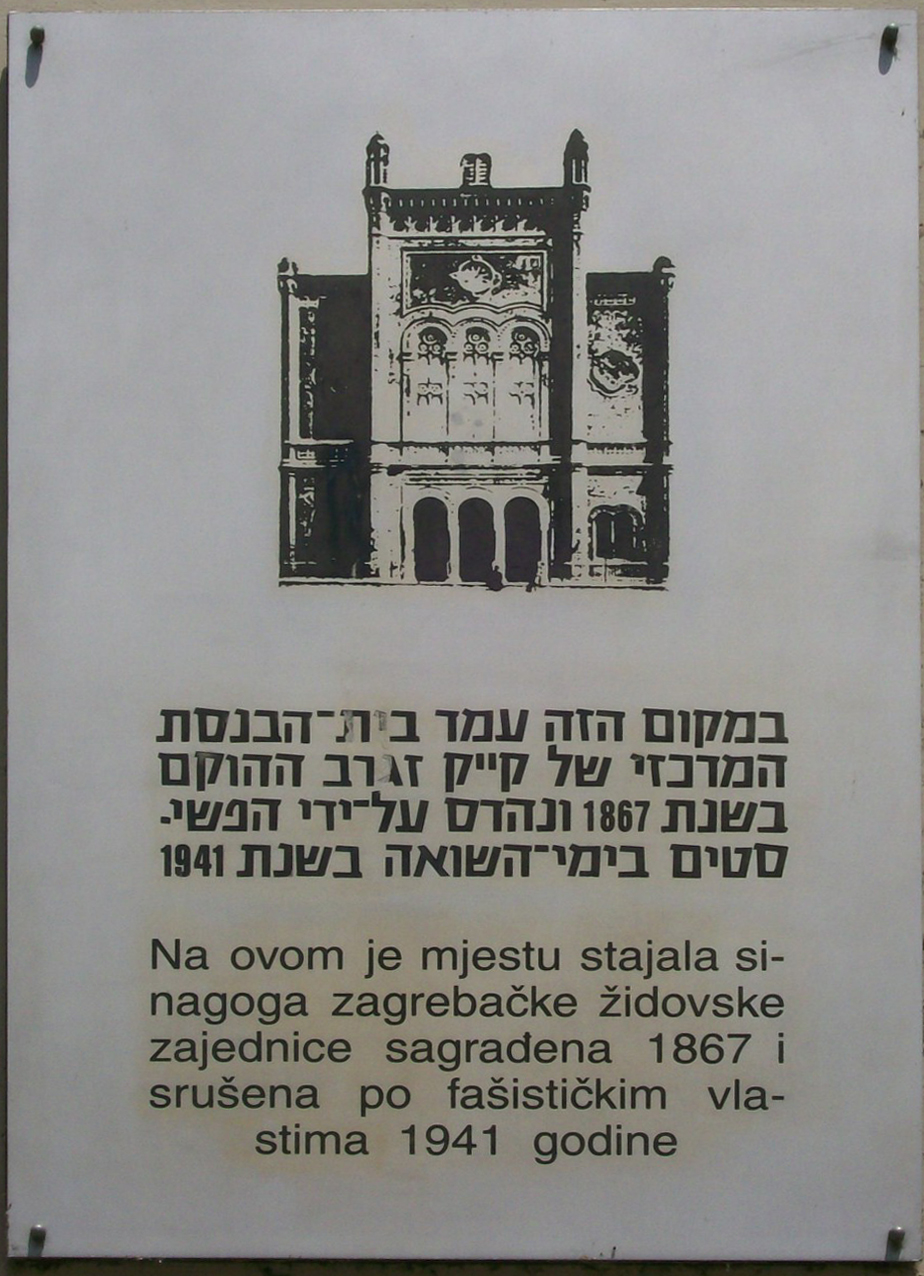
A memorial plaque in Hebrew and Croatian at place of Zagreb Synagogue, unveiled in 1986

Organisation Zagreb Yiddish Circle is club that organizes courses in Yiddish, lectures on Jewish history, linguistics and culture, movie nights, and hosts a Yiddish book club.

=== Ukrainian ===
Ukrainian-language classes are held in four schools in Lipovljani, Petrovci, Kaniža and Šumeće, attended by about 50 students. Central Library of Rusyns and Ukrainians in Croatia operates as a section of Public libraries in Zagreb. Library was established on 9 December 1995 and today part of its collection is accessible in public libraries in Vinkovci, Lipovljani, Slavonski Brod, Vukovar and Petrovci.

=== Romani ===
Croatia previously made a reservation to Article 7.5 of ratification by European Charter for Regional or Minority Languages (ECRML), which excluded non-territorial languages such as Romani from the application of the Charter. In the first evaluation report of 2 December 2000, expert groups and the Secretariat of the ECRML have recommended that Romani and Boyash Romanian be recognized as distinct minority languages used by the Roma. Croatian authorities are in the process of withdrawing the reservation. Veljko Kajtazi, Romani community MP in Croatia, stated that he will advocate to have the Roma language included on the list of minority languages in Croatia during his term in office.

Croatian Parliament formally recognised Romani Language Day on May 25, 2012, which was on their initiative also proclaimed by UNESCO in 2015. At the Faculty of Philosophy, University of Zagreb, two courses in the Romani language on the Romani language, literature, culture and history have been taught since November 5, 2012. Central Library of Roma in Croatia was established on 8 June 2020 in Zagreb, and is presently the only such library in Europe.

=== Istro-Romanian ===
Istro-Romanian is one of the smallest minority languages spoken in Croatia with fewer than 500 speakers concentrated mainly in the north-eastern part of the Istrian Peninsula. While the language is not officially recognized in the Constitution of Croatia under that name (the Constitution references Romanians and "Vlachs"), it is specifically recognized as such in the Statute of the Istrian Region and in the Statute of the Municipality of Kršan. In 2016, with funding from the Romanian government, the school in the village of Šušnjevica was fully renovated and is expected to start offering education in Istro-Romanian.

=== Other official languages ===
There are three other central libraries in Croatia. Bosniak's community central library is located in the town of Sisak, Albanian one in Zagreb and Slovenian in Karlovac.

== Municipalities with minority languages in official use ==
List of towns and municipalities with minority languages in official use:

Municipality	Name in minority language	Language	Affected settlements	Introduced based on	Population (2021)	Percentage of affected minority (2021)	County
Končanica	Končenice	Czech	All settlements	Constitutional Act	1,805	46.04%	Bjelovar-Bilogora
Daruvar	Daruvar	Czech	Ljudevit Selo, Daruvar, Donji Daruvar, Gornji Daruvar and Doljani	Town Statute	10,105	20.92%	Bjelovar-Bilogora
Kneževi Vinogradi	Hercegszöllős	Hungarian	Kneževi Vinogradi, Karanac, Zmajevac, Suza, Kamenac, Kotlina	Constitutional Act	3,357	38.70%	Osijek-Baranja
Bilje	Bellye	Hungarian	All settlements	Municipality Statute	4,772	25.94%	Osijek-Baranja
Ernestinovo	Ernestinovo	Hungarian	Laslovo	Municipality Statute	1,948	15.61%	Osijek-Baranja
Petlovac	Baranyaszentistván	Hungarian	Novi Bezdan	Municipality Statute	1,874	13.02%	Osijek-Baranja
Tompojevci	Tompojevci	Hungarian	Čakovci	Municipality Statute	1,116	8.06%	Vukovar-Syrmia
Tordinci	Tardhoz	Hungarian	Korođ	Municipality Statute	1,657	18.65%	Vukovar-Syrmia
Punitovci	Punitovci	Slovak	All settlements	Constitutional Act	1,562	33.16%	Osijek-Baranja
Našice	Našice	Slovak	Jelisavac	Town Statute	14,291	5.30%	Osijek-Baranja
Vrbovsko	Врбовско	Serbian	All settlements	Constitutional Act	3,876	32.38%	Primorje-Gorski Kotar
Vukovar	Вуковар	Serbian	All settlements	Constitutional Act	23,175	29.73%	Vukovar-Syrmia
Biskupija	Бискупија	Serbian	All settlements	Constitutional Act	1,177	81.90%	Šibenik-Knin
Borovo	Борово	Serbian	All settlements	Constitutional Act	3,555	90.69%	Vukovar-Syrmia
Civljane	Цивљане	Serbian	All settlements	Constitutional Act	171	73.68%	Šibenik-Knin
Donji Kukuruzari	Доњи Кукурузари	Serbian	All settlements	Constitutional Act	1,080	31.20%	Sisak-Moslavina
Dvor	Двор	Serbian	All settlements	Constitutional Act	2,996	67.26%	Sisak-Moslavina
Erdut	Ердут	Serbian	All settlements	Constitutional Act	5,436	53.68%	Osijek-Baranja
Ervenik	Ервеник	Serbian	All settlements	Constitutional Act	789	96.96%	Šibenik-Knin
Gračac	Грачац	Serbian	All settlements	Constitutional Act	3,136	43.37%	Zadar
Gvozd	Гвозд or Вргинмост	Serbian	All settlements	Constitutional Act	2,047	62.63%	Sisak-Moslavina
Jagodnjak	Јагодњак	Serbian	All settlements	Constitutional Act	1,500	62.87%	Osijek-Baranja
Kistanje	Кистање	Serbian	All settlements	Constitutional Act	2,650	51.89%	Šibenik-Knin
Krnjak	Крњак	Serbian	All settlements	Constitutional Act	1,332	58.03%	Karlovac
Markušica	Маркушица	Serbian	All settlements	Constitutional Act	1,773	90.24%	Vukovar-Syrmia
Negoslavci	Негославци	Serbian	All settlements	Constitutional Act	983	96.85%	Vukovar-Syrmia
Plaški	Плашки	Serbian	All settlements	Constitutional Act	1,650	39.76%	Karlovac
Šodolovci	Шодоловци	Serbian	All settlements	Constitutional Act	1,217	78.06%	Osijek-Baranja
Trpinja	Трпиња	Serbian	Village Ćelije excluded in municipality Statute	Constitutional Act	4,167	87.81%	Vukovar-Syrmia
Udbina	Удбина	Serbian	All settlements	Constitutional Act	1,334	42.65%	Lika-Senj
Vojnić	Војнић	Serbian	All settlements	Constitutional Act	3,602	38.45%	Karlovac
Vrhovine	Врховине	Serbian	All settlements	Constitutional Act	653	47.63%	Lika-Senj
Donji Lapac	Доњи Лапац	Serbian	All settlements	Constitutional Act	1,366	79.21%	Lika-Senj
Kneževi Vinogradi	Кнежеви Виногради	Serbian	Kneževi Vinogradi and Karanac	Municipality Statute	3,357	16.50%	Osijek-Baranja
Nijemci	Нијемци	Serbian	Banovci and Vinkovački Banovci	Municipality Statute	3,526	8.11%	Vukovar-Syrmia
Grožnjan	Grisignana	Italian	All settlements	Constitutional Act	656	35.82%	Istria
Brtonigla	Verteneglio	Italian	All settlements	Municipality Statute	1,523	31.78%	Istria
Buje	Buie	Italian	All settlements	Town Statute	4,441	23.85%	Istria
Cres	Cherso	Italian	All settlements	Town Statute	2,716	1.91%	Primorje-Gorski Kotar
Novigrad	Cittanova	Italian	All settlements	Town Statute	3,889	8.67%	Istria
Poreč	Parenzo	Italian	All settlements	Town Statute	16,607	2.54%	Istria
Pula	Pola	Italian	All settlements	City Statute	52,220	3.56%	Istria
Rijeka	Fiume	Italian	All settlements	City Statute	107,964	1.45%	Primorje-Gorski Kotar
Rovinj	Rovigno	Italian	All settlements	Town Statute	12,968	9.31%	Istria
Umag	Umago	Italian	All settlements	Town Statute	12,699	11.47%	Istria
Vodnjan	Dignano	Italian	All settlements	Town Statute	5,838	15.01%	Istria
Bale	Valle d'Istria	Italian	All settlements	Municipality Statute	1,170	20.51%	Istria
Fažana	Fasana	Italian	All settlements	Municipality Statute	3,463	3.81%	Istria
Funtana	Fontane	Italian	All settlements	Municipality Statute	911	1.54%	Istria
Kaštelir-Labinci	Castellier-Santa Domenica	Italian	All settlements	Municipality Statute	1,493	2.21%	Istria
Ližnjan	Lisignano	Italian	Šišan	Municipality Statute	4,087	3.89%	Istria
Motovun	Montona	Italian	All settlements	Municipality Statute	912	8.11%	Istria
Oprtalj	Portole	Italian	All settlements	Municipality Statute	748	10.96%	Istria
Tar-Vabriga	Torre-Abrega	Italian	All settlements	Municipality Statute	2,148	6.94%	Istria
Višnjan	Visignano	Italian	Višnjan, Markovac, Deklevi, Benčani, Štuti, Bucalovići, Legovići, Strpačići, Barat and Farini	Municipality Statute	2,096	4.10%	Istria
Vrsar	Orsera	Italian	All settlements	Municipality Statute	1,923	3.02%	Istria
Bogdanovci	Богдановци	Pannonian Rusyn	Petrovci	Municipality Statute	1,545	19.48%	Vukovar-Syrmia
Tompojevci	Томпојевци	Pannonian Rusyn	Mikluševci	Municipality Statute	1,116	16.40%	Vukovar-Syrmia

== History ==
During Napoleon I's invasion of Croatia in the early 19th century, a large portion was of the country was converted into the Illyrian Provinces (Provinces illyriennes) and incorporated as a French province in 1809. French rule established the official language of the autonomous province to be French followed by Croatian, Italian, German, and Slovene. According to France's Ministry for Europe and Foreign Affairs, about 6% of Croatians are fluent in basic conversation in French.

European Charter for Regional or Minority Languages became a legally binding for Croatia in 1997.

== See also ==
- Minority language
- Languages of Croatia
- Official language
- Demographics of Croatia
- Linguistic rights
- Language policy
- Languages of the European Union
