= Diklići =

Diklići is a place name found in former Yugoslavia. It may refer to:

- Diklići, Trebinje, Bosnia and Herzegovina
- Diklići, Ravno, Bosnia and Herzegovina
- Diklići, Croatia

== See also ==
- Diklić, surname
