= Farini =

Farini may refer to:

- Farini, Croatia, a village in the Višnjan municipality
- Farini, Emilia-Romagna, a town and comune in Italy
- Luigi Carlo Farini (1812-1866), Prime Minister of Italy
- Domenico Farini (1834-1900), soldier and politician, son of Luigi Carlo Farini
- The Great Farini (1838–1929), an entertainer
