= Antun Labak =

Croatian footballer

Personal information
- Date of birth: 14 July 1970 (age 56)
- Place of birth: Josipovac Punitovački, SR Croatia, Yugoslavia
- Height: 1.83 m (6 ft 0 in)
- Position: Striker

Youth career
- Croatia Đakovo

Senior career*
Years	Team	Apps	(Gls)
1991–1996	Osijek	103	(30)
1996–1997	Stuttgarter Kickers	24	(3)
1997–2001	Energie Cottbus	124	(32)
2002	LR Ahlen	9	(2)
2002–2005	Eintracht Trier	75	(14)
Total		335	(81)

Managerial career
- 2014: Zrinski Jurjevac
- 2016–2018: Đakovo Croatia
- 2018: Marsonia (assistant)
- 2018: Zrinski Jurjevac
- 2020–2022: Vihor Jelisavac
- 2022–2023: Zrinski Jurjevac
- * Club domestic league appearances and goals

Antun Labak (born 14 July 1970) is a Croatian retired professional footballer who played as a striker. He succeeded Josip Milardović as manager of Zrinski Jurjevac in October 2022.

== Managerial career ==
He was assistant to head coach Robert Špehar at Marsonia and later managed Đakovo Croatia. Labak was appointed manager of Vihor Jelisavac in June 2020.
