= Markóc =

- Village
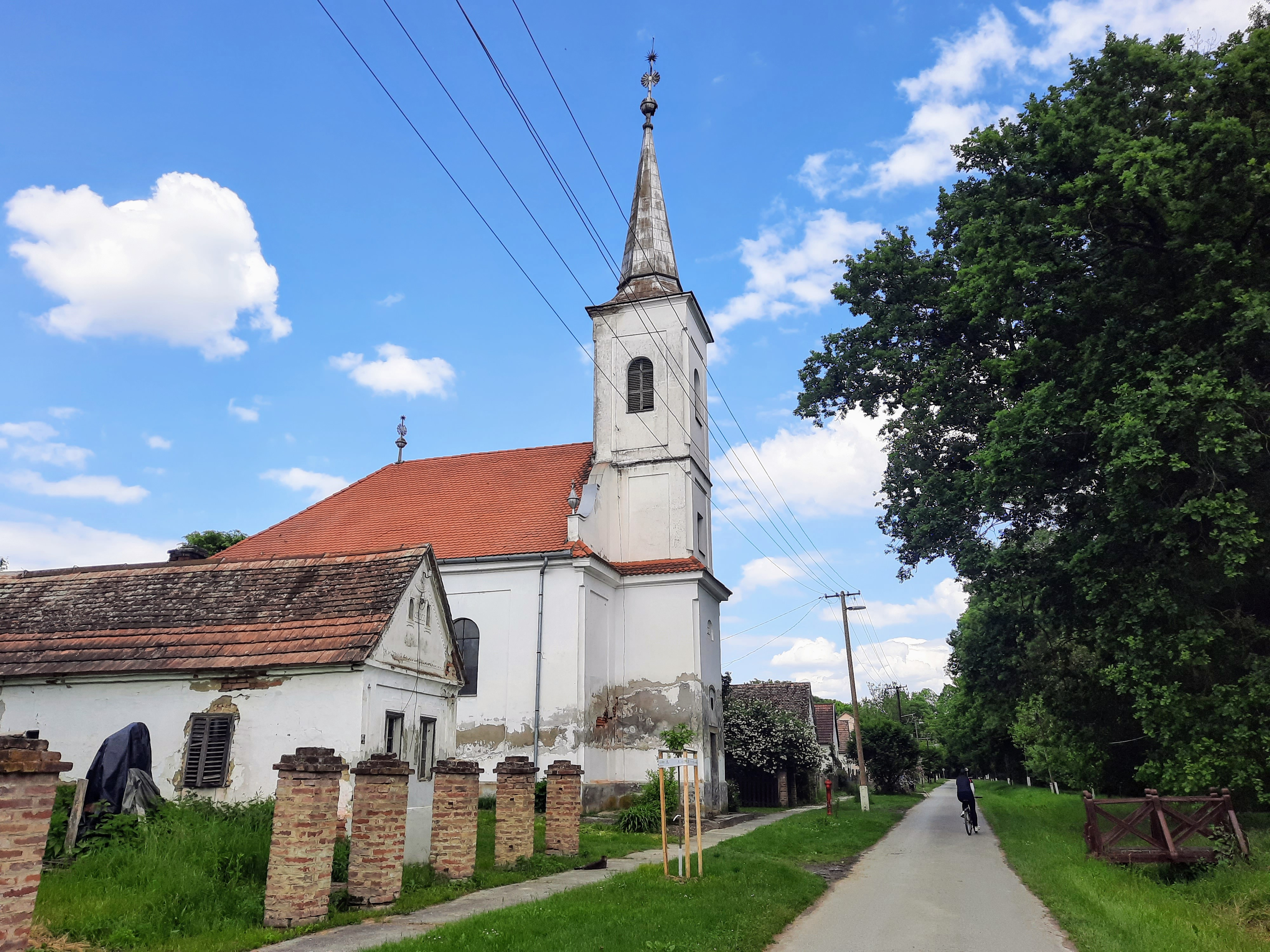
- Interactive map of Markóc
- Coordinates: 45°52′N 17°46′E
- Country: Hungary
- County: Baranya
- Time zone: UTC+1 (CET)
  - Summer (DST): UTC+2 (CEST)

Markóc is a village in Baranya county, Hungary.

== Etymology ==
The name is of Slavic origin *Markьcь or Markovc(i), see Markovac, Markovci. 1403 Markochel (Markolch?), 1492 Markowcz.

== Demographics ==
In 2001, the population of Baranya county numbered 407,448 inhabitants, including:

- Hungarians = 375,611 (92.19%)
- Germans = 22,720 (5.58%)
- Romani = 10,623 (2.61%)
- Croats = 7,294 (1.79%)
- others.
