= Cerion =

Cerion may refer to:

- Cerion (gastropod), a genus of small to medium-sized tropical air-breathing land snails in the family Cerionidae
- Cerion (fungus), a genus of fungi in the family Rhytismataceae
- Cerion, Croatia, a village in Istria
