= Markovac =

Markovac may refer to several places:

- Markovac (Čelinac), a village near Čelinac, Bosnia and Herzegovina
- Markovac (Mladenovac), a village in Serbia
- Markovac (Vršac), a village in Serbia
- Markovac (Velika Plana), a village in Serbia
- Markovac, Bjelovar-Bilogora County, a village in Croatia
- Markovac, Istria County, a village near Višnjan, Croatia
- Markovac, Požega-Slavonia County, a village near Velika, Croatia
- Markovac, Šibenik-Knin County, a village near Biskupija, Croatia
- Dubravski Markovac, a village near Dubrava, Zagreb County, Croatia
- Markovac Križevački, a village in Croatia
- Markovac Našički, a village in Croatia
- Donji Markovac, a village near Farkaševac, Croatia
- Trojstveni Markovac, a village in Croatia

== See also ==
- Marko (disambiguation)
