= Milan Pavličić =

Croatian footballer

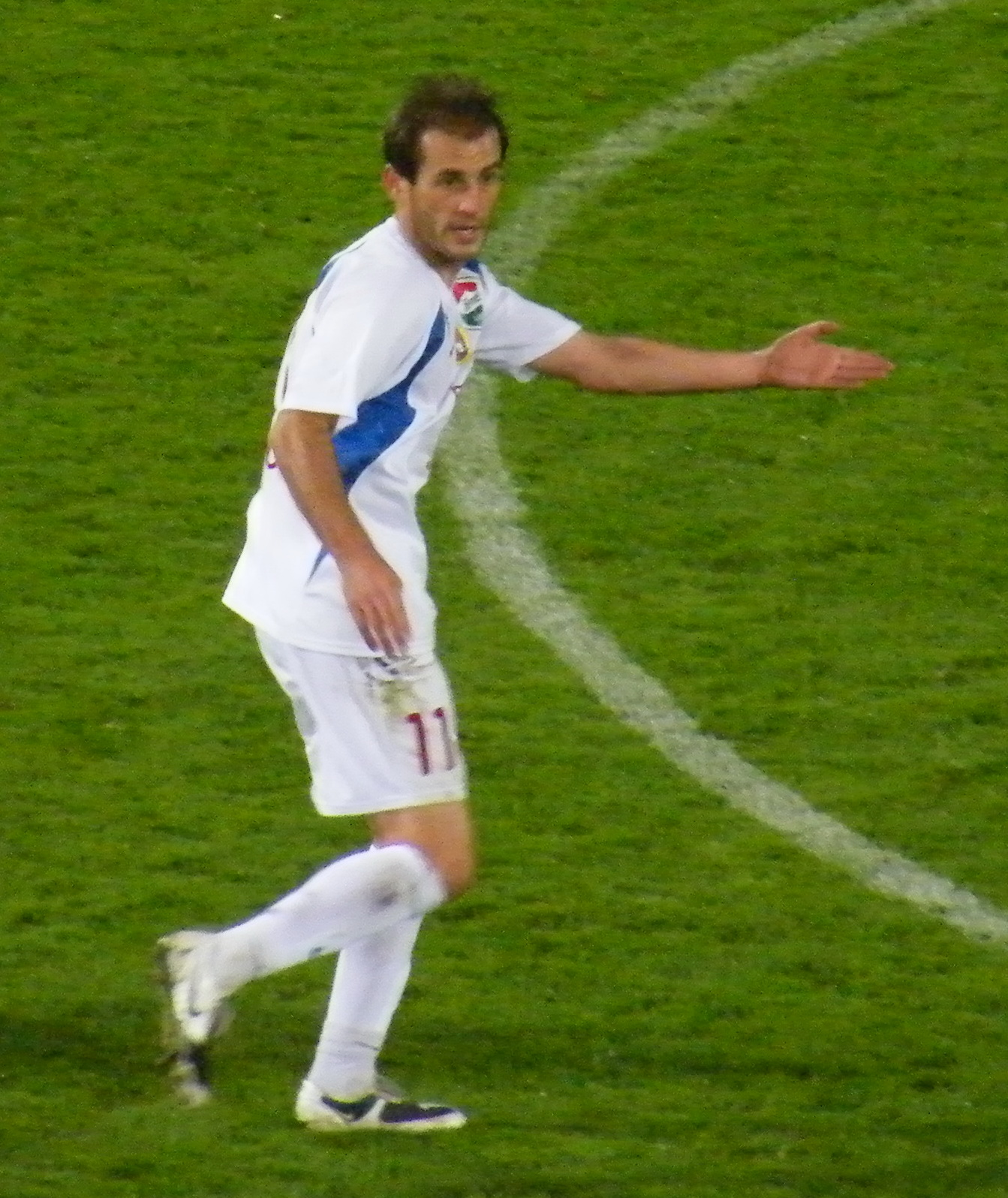

Personal information
- Date of birth: 20 December 1980 (age 45)
- Place of birth: Osijek, SFR Yugoslavia
- Height: 1.74 m (5 ft 9 in)
- Position: Forward

Senior career*
Years	Team	Apps	(Gls)
1999–2003	Osijek	48	(21)
2003–2006	Varteks	64	(9)
2006–2008	Osijek	57	(8)
2008–2009	Fehérvár	19	(4)
2009–2012	Osijek	26	(3)
2012	Radnički Niš	7	(0)
2013–2014	Grafičar Vodovod		
2014–2015	Borac Kneževi Vinogradi		
2015–2016	Tomislav Livana		
2016–2017	Vihor Jelisavac		
2018–2020	SV Hajduk Wiesbaden	34	(14)

International career^{‡}
2000	Croatia U20	4	(1)
- * Club domestic league appearances and goals as of 6 August 2012 ‡ National team caps and goals as of 6 August 2012

Milan Pavličić (born 20 December 1980) is a Croatian retired football forward.

== Club career ==
Born in Osijek, SR Croatia, Pavličić played between 1999 and 2008 in the Croatian First League with NK Osijek and NK Varteks.

In summer 2008, he joined FC Fehérvár in the Hungarian NBI. In the following summer, he returned to NK Osijek.

On 8 August 2012, he moved abroad again by signing a 2-year contract with newly promoted Serbian SuperLiga side FK Radnički Niš.

He then returned to Croatia and played for lower-league clubs such as NK Grafičar Vodovod and also with Borac Kneževi Vinogradi, Tomislav Livana and Vihor Jelisavac, before moving to Germany and joining SV Hajduk Wiesbaden.

== International career ==
He represented Croatia at U-20 level.
