= Hrvoje Babec =

Croatian footballer

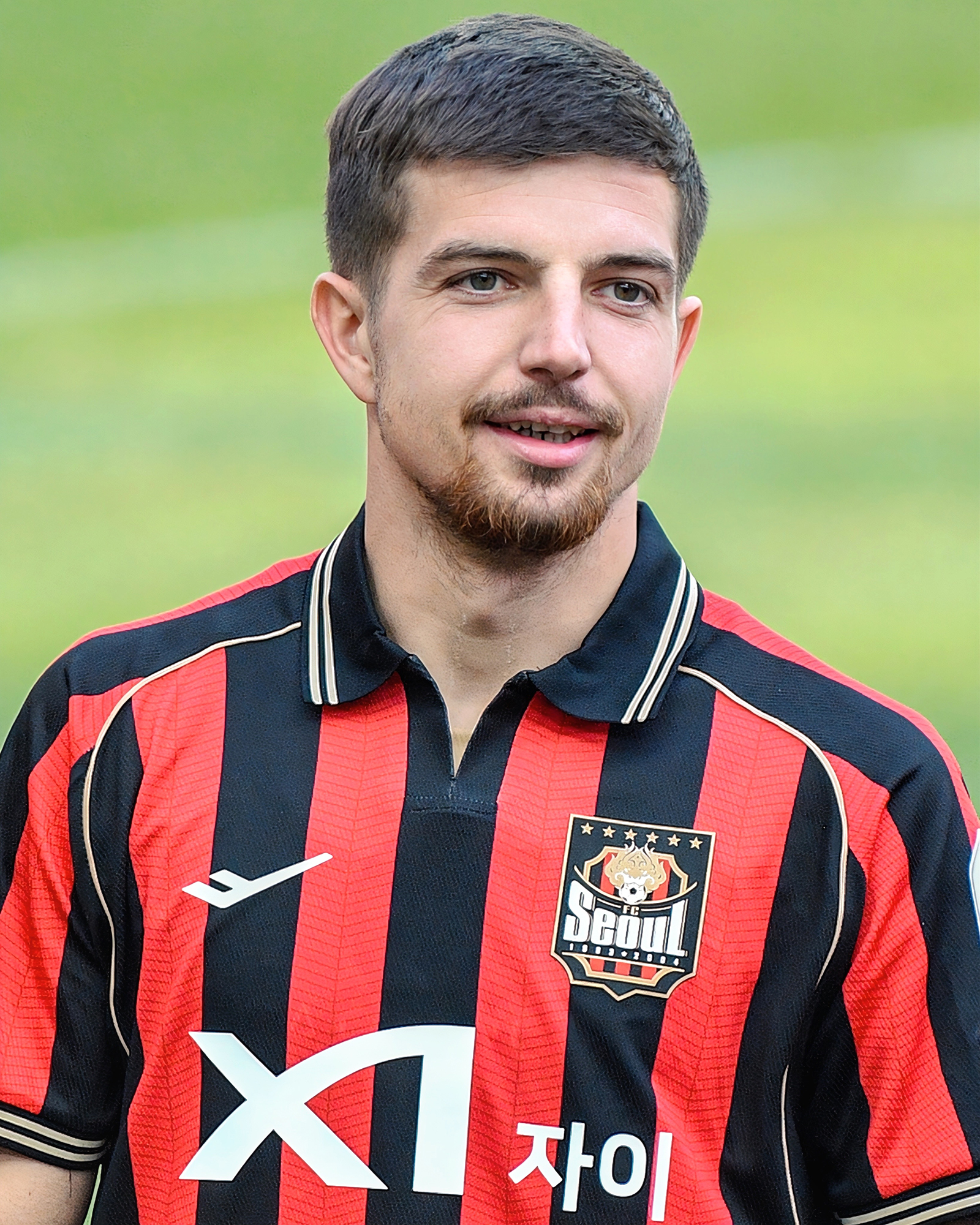
- Babec in 2026

Personal information
- Date of birth: 28 July 1999 (age 27)
- Place of birth: Virovitica, Croatia
- Height: 1.87 m (6 ft 2 in)
- Position: Midfielder

Team information
- Current team: FC Seoul
- Number: 6

Youth career
- 2008-2011: Virovitica
- 2011: Osijek
- 2012-2015: KNŠ Hypo Limač
- 2016-2018: Metz

Senior career*
Years	Team	Apps	(Gls)
2017–2018	Metz II	8	(0)
2018–2019	Vihor Jelisavac	24	(7)
2019–2022	Gorica	92	(6)
2022–2025	Riga	74	(8)
2025	→ Osijek (loan)	18	(2)
2025–2026	Osijek	15	(1)
2026–	Seoul	31	(3)

International career
2015–2016	Croatia U17	10	(0)
2017	Croatia U18	2	(0)
2021	Croatia U21	4	(0)
- * Club domestic league appearances and goals as of 11:15, 18 October 2026 (UTC)

Hrvoje Babec (born 28 July 1999) is a Croatian professional footballer who plays as a midfielder for K League 1 club FC Seoul.

== Career ==
=== Early career ===
Born in Virovitica, Babec grew up in the nearby village of Brezik, traveling to train with Virovitica. He was noted early by scouts from bigger clubs and moved to NK Osijek. At the start of 2012 Babec then moved to the Hypo-Limač football academy, run by former Croatia internationals Petar Krpan and Matko Babić. After winning the national amateur club U-17 championship with the team, still 15 years old, he was scouted by foreign scouts and went to train with the Belgian RFC Seraing, and, since he couldn't be signed by them, moved forward after half a year later to France, to join the academy of RFC Seraing's partner club, FC Metz.

In Metz, Babec would go on to become the captain of the FC Metz U-19 team, getting his first taste of senior football, playing for Metz II. In 2018, following managerial advice, Babec left France, and went on trial with Dinamo Zagreb B, but the transfer fell through. In September 2018, then, looking for minutes, Babec moved to the Croatian third-tier club Vihor Jelisavac for one season.

=== HNK Gorica ===
On 14 July 2019, he signed with Gorica. Babec made his professional debut with Gorica in a 1–1 Croatian First Football League win over NK Inter Zaprešić on 20 July 2019.

== International career ==
Babec was born in Croatia, and was called up to represent the Croatia U21 at the 2021 UEFA European Under-21 Championship.

== Honours ==
Riga

- Latvian Cup: 2023

FC Seoul

- K League 1: 2026
