= Anžići =

Anžići Ansicci
- Village
- Location within Croatia
- Coordinates: 45.255°N 13.773°E
- Country: Croatia
- County: Istria County
- Municipality: Višnjan

Area
  - Total: 0.39 sq mi (1.0 km^{2})

Population (2021)
  - Total: 52
  - Density: 130/sq mi (52/km^{2})
- Time zone: UTC+1 (CET)
  - Summer (DST): UTC+2 (CEST)
- Postal code: 52463 Višnjan
- Area code: 052

Anžići (Italian: Ansicci) is a village in Croatia located in Istria, in the municipality of Višnjan, in Istria County.

== Demographics ==
According to the 2021 census, its population was 52. In 2001, the village had 44 inhabitants.

Demographic evolution
Year	1948	1953	1961	1971	1981	1991	2001
Pop.	66	68	62	63	48	49	44
±%	—	+3.0%	−8.8%	+1.6%	−23.8%	+2.1%	−10.2%

== See also ==
- Antonci, Poreč
