= Municipium Iasorum =

Territory in Roman-era Pannonia, now in Croatia

Approximate location of the Municipium Iasorum

Municipium Iasorum or Res publica Iasorum was an autonomous territory in ancient Roman Pannonia (in present-day Croatia), located in the area around present-day town of Daruvar. Its administrative center was the town of Municipium Iasorum, located in or near present-day Daruvar. The territory of the region extended from the Sava to the Drava.

== Name ==
Terms Res Publica Iasorum and Municipium Iasorum referred to both the administrative center of the region; and the area that was under its jurisdiction.

Other terms for the region (and town) include Jasoru Republic, Respublik Iasoru and Respublica Jassorum, while other terms for the town itself included Aquae Balissae, Jasi and Jazora.

== History ==
The first written sources that could refer to these areas of southern Pannonia offer information about the Pannonian (Illyrian)-Celtic tribe of the Iasi. Iasi were autochtonic people of Pannonia, but there is possibility of their distant Iranian origin, due to the similarity of their ethnic name with name of Sarmatian Iazyges.

The first contact of the Iasi with the Romans is attributed to the period of the latter's penetration to Segestica in 159 or 156 BC. After the repression of the major rebellion headed by Bato (6-9 AD), the Romans founded a military camp in the Daruvar basin, at the site previously occupied by the Iasian oppidum. Through the process of Romanization, the tribal civitas acquired the status of Res Publica Iasorum. With the partition of Pannonia at the beginning of the 2nd century, it belonged to Pannonia Superior.

During the reign of Hadrian, Italic immigrants, veterans and other foreign bearers of the rights of Roman citizenship organized themselves, together with the local inhabitants, into Municipium Iasorum at the site of the ancient oppidum in the Daruvar basin. The city was the administrative center of the Iasi tribe, but the extensive territory of the tribe had other prominent settlements, such as Aquae Iasae (near today's Varaždinske Toplice) and at least one settlement called Iovia (near today's Ludbreg), that were not part of the Municipium.

== Inscriptions ==
Inscriptions founded in the ruins of ancient Roman bath near Daruvar are indicating that republic dedicated this bath to Roman emperor Commodus (180-192 AD).

One of the inscriptions founded near Daruvar says:

- DIVO LUC AUREL
- COMMODO CAES
- PATRI PATRIAE
- HAS THERMAS
- DEDICA VIT
- RESPUBLIK IASORU

Another inscription founded in the area says:

- THERMAE
- IASORVENSES H C

== Literature ==
- Taube, Friedrich Wilhelm von (1777). Historische und geographische Beschreibung des Königreiches Slavonien und des Herzogthumes Syrmien. Vol. 1. Leipzig.
- Taube, Friedrich Wilhelm von (1777). Historische und geographische Beschreibung des Königreiches Slavonien und des Herzogthumes Syrmien. Vol. 2. Leipzig.
- Taube, Friedrich Wilhelm von (1778). Historische und geographische Beschreibung des Königreiches Slavonien und des Herzogthumes Syrmien. Vol. 3. Leipzig.
