= Kolumbera =

- Village
- Location within Croatia
- Coordinates: 45.277765°N 13.7015757°E
- Country: Croatia
- County: Istria County
- Municipality: Višnjan

Area
  - Total: 0.27 sq mi (0.7 km^{2})

Population (2021)
  - Total: 28
  - Density: 100/sq mi (40/km^{2})
- Time zone: UTC+1 (CET)
  - Summer (DST): UTC+2 (CEST)
- Postal code: 52463 Višnjan
- Area code: 052

Kolumbera is a village in Višnjan municipality in Istria County, Croatia.

== Demographics ==
According to the 2021 census, its population was 28.
