= Gambetići =

Gambetići Gambetti, Milokanović
- Village
- Interactive map of Gambetići
- Coordinates: 45.239°N 13.744°E
- Country: Croatia
- County: Istria County
- Municipality: Višnjan

Area
  - Total: 0.81 sq mi (2.1 km^{2})

Population (2021)
  - Total: 15
  - Density: 18/sq mi (7.1/km^{2})
- Time zone: UTC+1 (CET)
  - Summer (DST): UTC+2 (CEST)
- Postal code: 52463 Višnjan
- Area code: 052

Gambetići (Italian: Gambetti) is a village in Višnjan-Visignano municipality in Istria County, Croatia.

== History ==
On 1 August 2021, a tornado of intensity IF2 and maximum width 200 metres (660 ft) touched down at Gambetići, travelling 7.3 kilometres (4.5 mi) through Fabci to Livaki by Škropeti.

== Demographics ==
Village of: Population trends 1857–2021
v

population			27	28	42	46			43	40	30	31	24	23	16	15	15
	1857	1869	1880	1890	1900	1910	1921	1931	1948	1953	1961	1971	1981	1991	2001	2011	2021

Note:Under Sveti Ivan in 1857, 1869, 1921 and 1931. "Milokanović" from 1890 to 1910. Considered a dio naselja from 1880 to 1910. Sources: Croatian Bureau of Statistics publications
