= Kurjavići =

Kurjavići Curiavici
- Village
- Location within Croatia
- Coordinates: 45.2703396°N 13.7645832°E
- Country: Croatia
- County: Istria County
- Municipality: Višnjan

Area
  - Total: 0.62 sq mi (1.6 km^{2})

Population (2021)
  - Total: 21
  - Density: 34/sq mi (13/km^{2})
- Time zone: UTC+1 (CET)
  - Summer (DST): UTC+2 (CEST)
- Postal code: 52463 Višnjan
- Area code: 052

Kurjavići (Italian: Curiavici) is a village in Višnjan-Visignano municipality in Istria County, Croatia.

== Demographics ==
According to the 2021 census, its population was 21.
