= Diklići, Ravno =

Diklići Диклићи
- Village
- Location within Bosnia and Herzegovina
- Coordinates: 42.7822012°N 18.0776167°E
- Country: Bosnia and Herzegovina
- Entity: Republika Srpska; Federation of Bosnia and Herzegovina
- Canton: Herzegovina-Neretva
- Municipality: Trebinje; Ravno

Area
  - Total: 2.25 sq mi (5.83 km^{2})

Population (2013)
  - Total: 1
  - Density: 0.44/sq mi (0.17/km^{2})
- Time zone: UTC+1 (CET)
  - Summer (DST): UTC+2 (CEST)

Diklići (Serbian Cyrillic: Диклићи) is a village in the municipality of Trebinje, Republika Srpska, Bosnia and Herzegovina and partially in the municipality of Ravno, Bosnia and Herzegovina.

== History ==
During World War II Partisan forces attacked a German train between the railway stations of Diklići and Gojšina, killing 2 German soldiers and 1 Domobran.

During the Yugoslav Wars, the village was attacked and burnt down by Croat forces.

== Demographics ==
According to the 1991 census, it was inhabited by 13 people, all ethnic Serbs.

According to the 2013 census, its population was just 1, a Serb living in the Trebinje part.

== Sources ==
- Vojnoistorijski institut (1969). Zbornik dokumenata i podataka o narodnooslobodilačkom ratu naroda Jugoslavija. Vol. 3. Belgrade: Vojnoistorijski institut. p. 469.
- Vojnoistorijski institut (1970). Zbornik dokumenata i podataka o narodnooslobodilačkom ratu naroda Jugoslavija. Vol. 4. Belgrade: Vojnoistorijski institut. p. 619.
