= Lipovac Majur =

- Village
- Location within Croatia
- Coordinates: 45.6179464°N 17.1695184°E
- Country: Croatia
- County: Bjelovar-Bilogora County
- Municipality: Daruvar

Area
  - Total: 1.3 sq mi (3.4 km^{2})

Population (2021)
  - Total: 67
  - Density: 51/sq mi (20/km^{2})
- Time zone: UTC+1 (CET)
  - Summer (DST): UTC+2 (CEST)

Lipovac Majur is a village in Croatia.

== Demographics ==
According to the 2021 census, its population was 67.
