= Daruvarski Vinogradi =

- Village
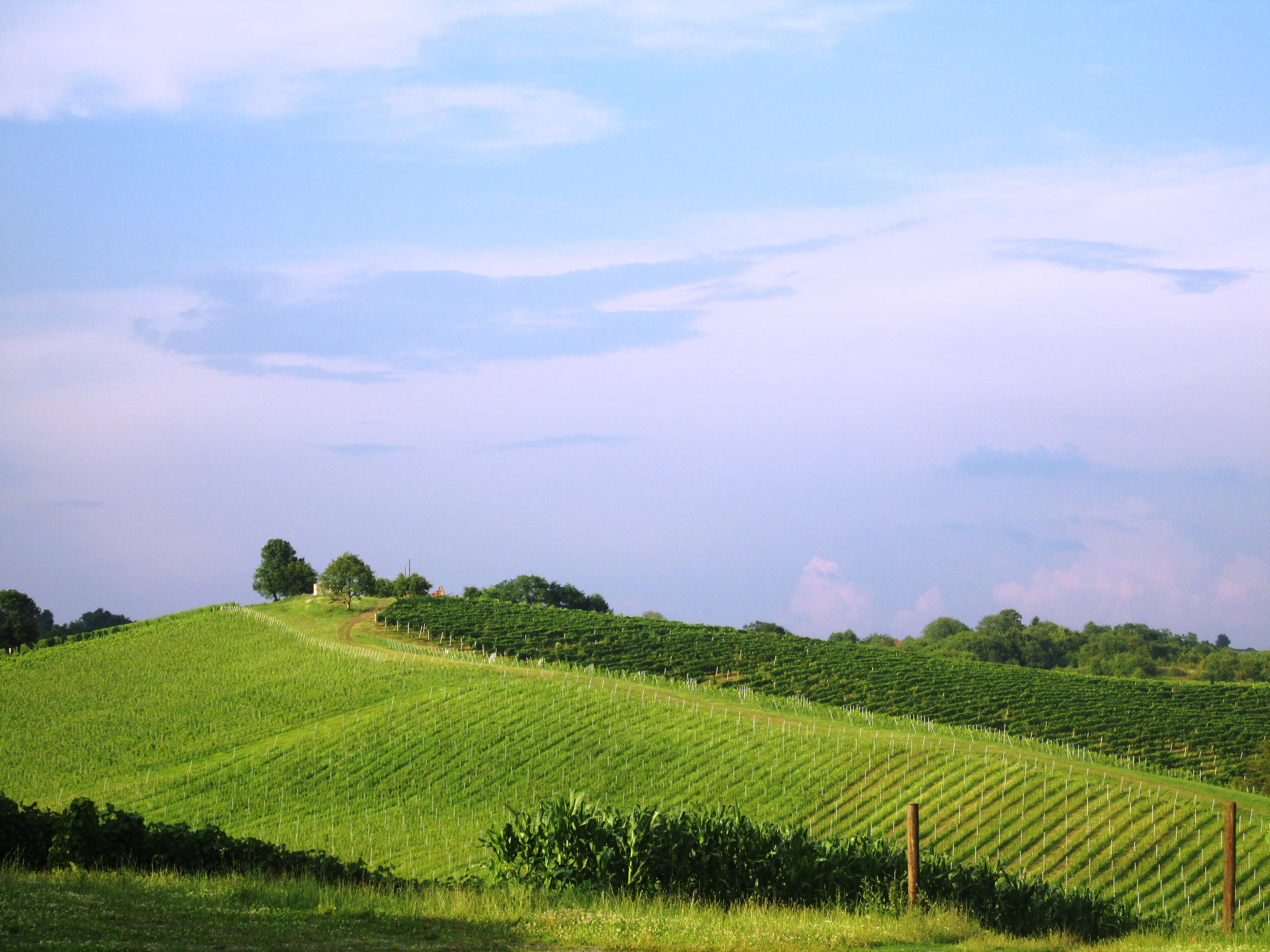

- Location within Croatia
- Coordinates: 45.6021713°N 17.2354418°E
- Country: Croatia
- County: Bjelovar-Bilogora County
- Municipality: Daruvar

Area
  - Total: 0.46 sq mi (1.2 km^{2})

Population (2021)
  - Total: 182
  - Density: 390/sq mi (150/km^{2})
- Time zone: UTC+1 (CET)
  - Summer (DST): UTC+2 (CEST)

Daruvarski Vinogradi is a village in Croatia.

== Demographics ==
According to the 2021 census, its population was 182.
