= Diklić =

Diklić (Serbian Cyrillic: Диклић) is a Serbo-Croatian surname, predominantly borne by ethnic Serbs. It may refer to:

- Arsen Diklić (1922–1995), Yugoslav Serbian poet, novelist and film director
- Bogdan Diklić (born 1953), Yugoslav and Serbian actor
- Jasna Diklić (born 1946), Yugoslav and Bosnian actress
- Spomenka Hribar née Diklić (born 1941), Slovenian author, philosopher, sociologist, politician, columnist, and public intellectual

== See also ==
- Diklići (disambiguation)
