= Pršurići =

Pršurići Persurici
- Village
- Location within Croatia
- Coordinates: 45.2374673°N 13.7004179°E
- Country: Croatia
- County: Istria County
- Municipality: Višnjan

Area
  - Total: 0.73 sq mi (1.9 km^{2})

Population (2021)
  - Total: 45
  - Density: 61/sq mi (24/km^{2})
- Time zone: UTC+1 (CET)
  - Summer (DST): UTC+2 (CEST)
- Postal code: 52463 Višnjan
- Area code: 052

Pršurići (Italian: Persurici) is a village in Višnjan-Visignano municipality in Istria County, Croatia.

== Demographics ==
According to the 2021 census, its population was 45.
