= Zoričići =

Zoričići Zori
- Village
- Location within Croatia
- Coordinates: 45.2605073°N 13.7326766°E
- Country: Croatia
- County: Istria County
- Municipality: Višnjan

Area
  - Total: 0.50 sq mi (1.3 km^{2})

Population (2021)
  - Total: 26
  - Density: 52/sq mi (20/km^{2})
- Time zone: UTC+1 (CET)
  - Summer (DST): UTC+2 (CEST)
- Postal code: 52463 Višnjan
- Area code: 052

Zoričići (Italian: Zori) is a village in Višnjan municipality in Istria County, Croatia.

== Demographics ==
According to the 2021 census, its population was 26.
