= Cvitani =

Cvitani Civitani
- Village
- Location within Croatia
- Coordinates: 45.2439713°N 13.7424004°E
- Country: Croatia
- County: Istria County
- Municipality: Višnjan

Area
  - Total: 0.42 sq mi (1.1 km^{2})

Population (2021)
  - Total: 20
  - Density: 47/sq mi (18/km^{2})
- Time zone: UTC+1 (CET)
  - Summer (DST): UTC+2 (CEST)
- Postal code: 52463 Višnjan
- Area code: 052

Cvitani (Italian: Civitani) is a village in Višnjan-Visignano municipality in Istria County, Croatia.

== Demographics ==
According to the 2021 census, its population was 20.
