= Novaki Motovunski =

Novaki Motovunski Novacco di Montona
- Village
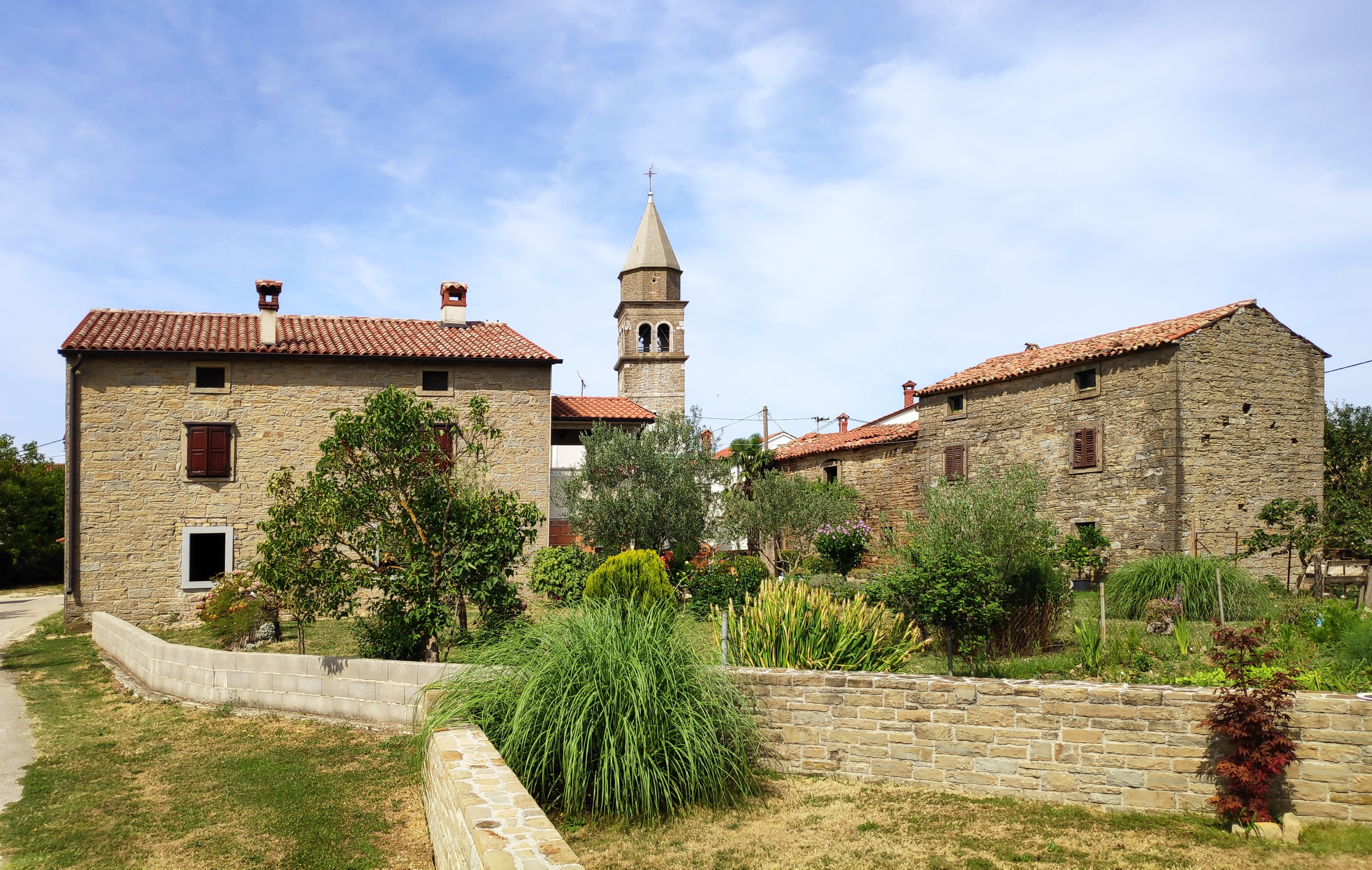

- Location within Croatia
- Coordinates: 45.2974668°N 13.8368868°E
- Country: Croatia
- County: Istria County
- Municipality: Karojba

Area
  - Total: 2.8 sq mi (7.3 km^{2})

Population (2021)
  - Total: 373
  - Density: 130/sq mi (51/km^{2})
- Time zone: UTC+1 (CET)
  - Summer (DST): UTC+2 (CEST)
- Postal code: 52424 Motovun
- Area code: 052

Novaki Motovunski (Novacco di Montona in Italian) is a village in the municipality of Karojba in Istria, Croatia.

== Demographics ==
According to the 2021 census, its population was 373.
