= Daruvar =

Spa town in Slavonia, Croatia

- Town
- Town of Daruvar; Grad Daruvar; Město Daruvar
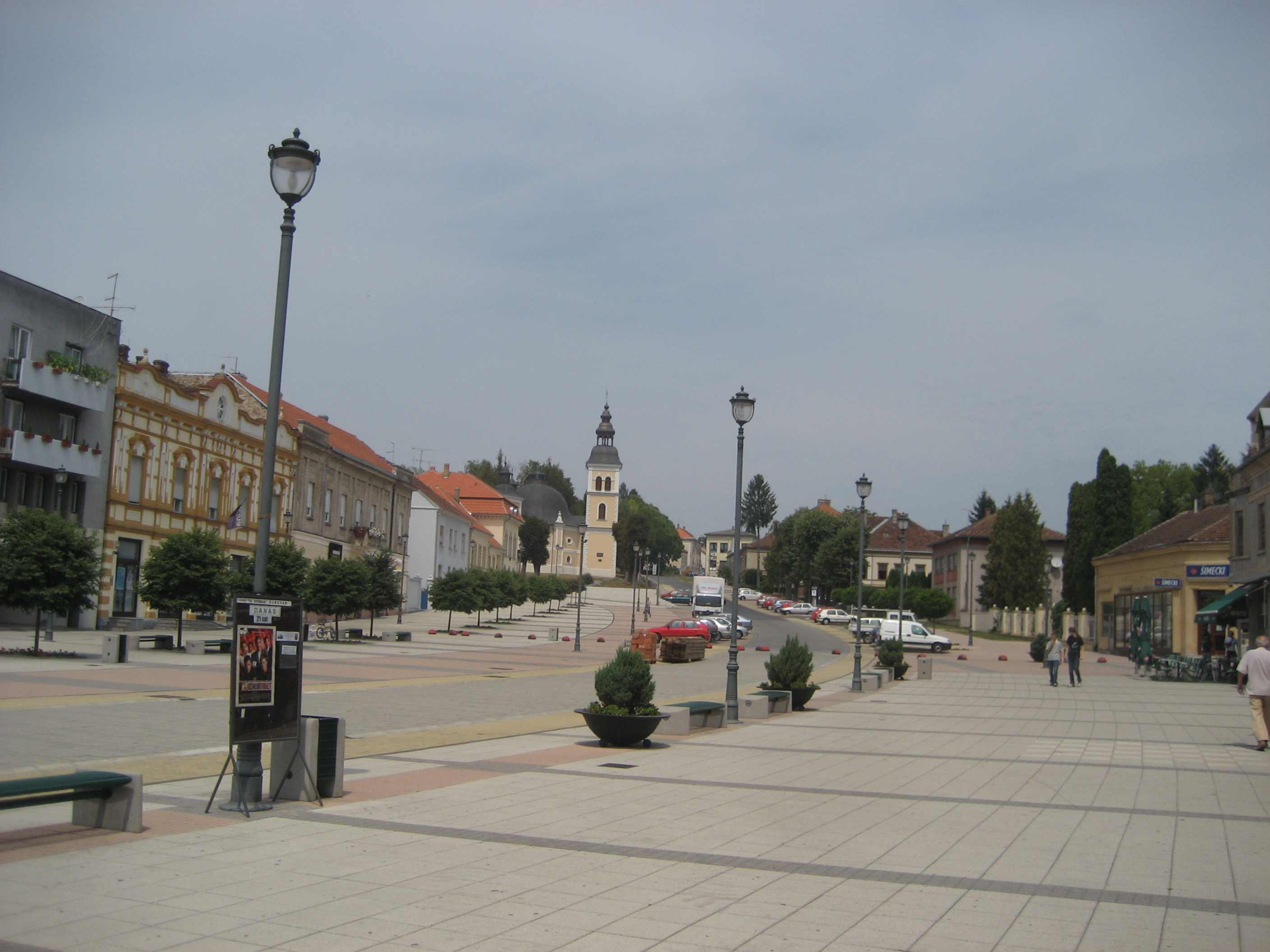
- Main street in Daruvar

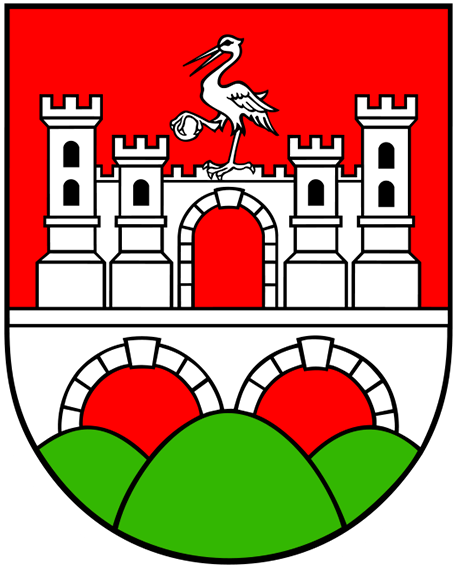
- Coat of arms
- Interactive map of Daruvar
- Location of Daruvar in Croatia
- Coordinates: 45.592895°N 17.223685°E
- Country: Croatia
- Region: Slavonia
- County: Bjelovar-Bilogora County

Government
  - Mayor: Damir Lneniček (HDZ)

Area
  - Town: 64.7 km^{2} (25.0 sq mi)
  - Urban: 8.5 km^{2} (3.3 sq mi)

Population (2021)
  - Town: 10,105
  - Density: 156/km^{2} (405/sq mi)
  - Urban: 7,440
  - Urban density: 880/km^{2} (2,300/sq mi)
- Time zone: UTC+1 (CET)
  - Summer (DST): UTC+2 (CEST)
- Website: daruvar.hr

Daruvar (Note: Czech: Daruvar, German: Daruwar, Hungarian: Daruvár, Serbian: Дарувар, Latin: Aquae Balissae) is a spa town and municipality in Slavonia, northeastern Croatia, with a population of 8,567. The area including the surrounding villages (Daruvarski Vinogradi, Doljani, Donji Daruvar, Gornji Daruvar, Lipovac Majur, Ljudevit Selo, Markovac, and Vrbovac) had a population of 11,633 in 2011.

It is located in the foothills of the Papuk mountain and along the Toplica River. The main political and cultural centre of the Czech national minority in Croatia, Daruvar has a winemaking tradition reportedly dating back more than 2,000 years.

== Geography ==
Daruvar is located 125 km from Zagreb, the national capital, and 130 km from Osijek, the main city of Slavonia to the east. The closest cities are Pakrac, Lipik, Novska, Križevci, Bjelovar, and Virovitica.

== Administration ==
Daruvar is located in the Bjelovar-Bilogora County. In 2021, the town had 10,105 residents in the following 9 settlements:

- Daruvar, population 7440
- Daruvarski Vinogradi, population 182
- Doljani, population 650
- Donji Daruvar, population 624
- Gornji Daruvar, population 346
- Lipovac Majur, population 67
- Ljudevit Selo, population 217
- Markovac, population 71
- Vrbovac, population 508

== Etymology ==
Its name is a conjunction of the Hungarian words daru (English: crane (bird)) and vár (English: castle). This etymology is reflected in the coat of arms of the city.

== History ==
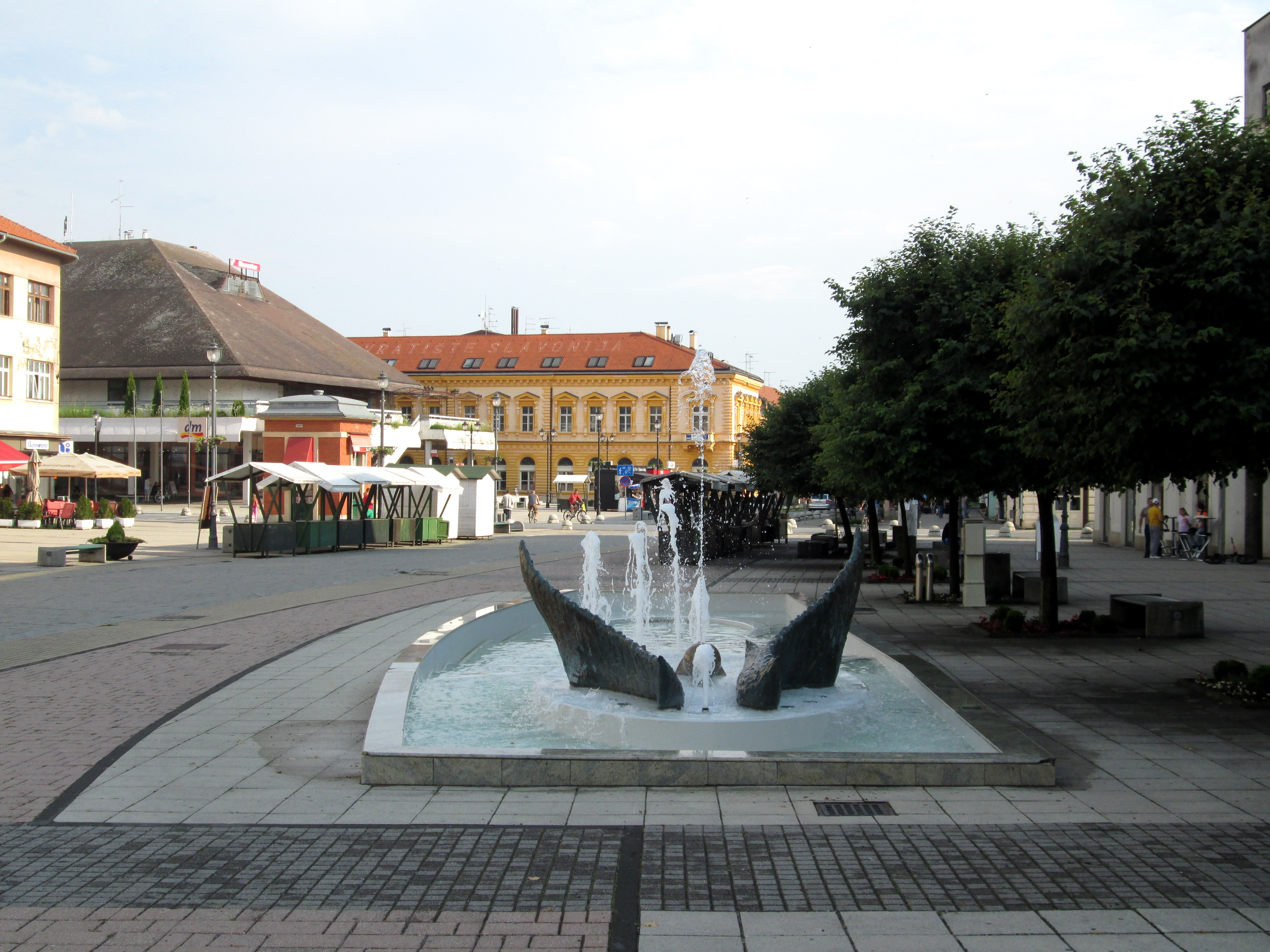
Daruvar town center

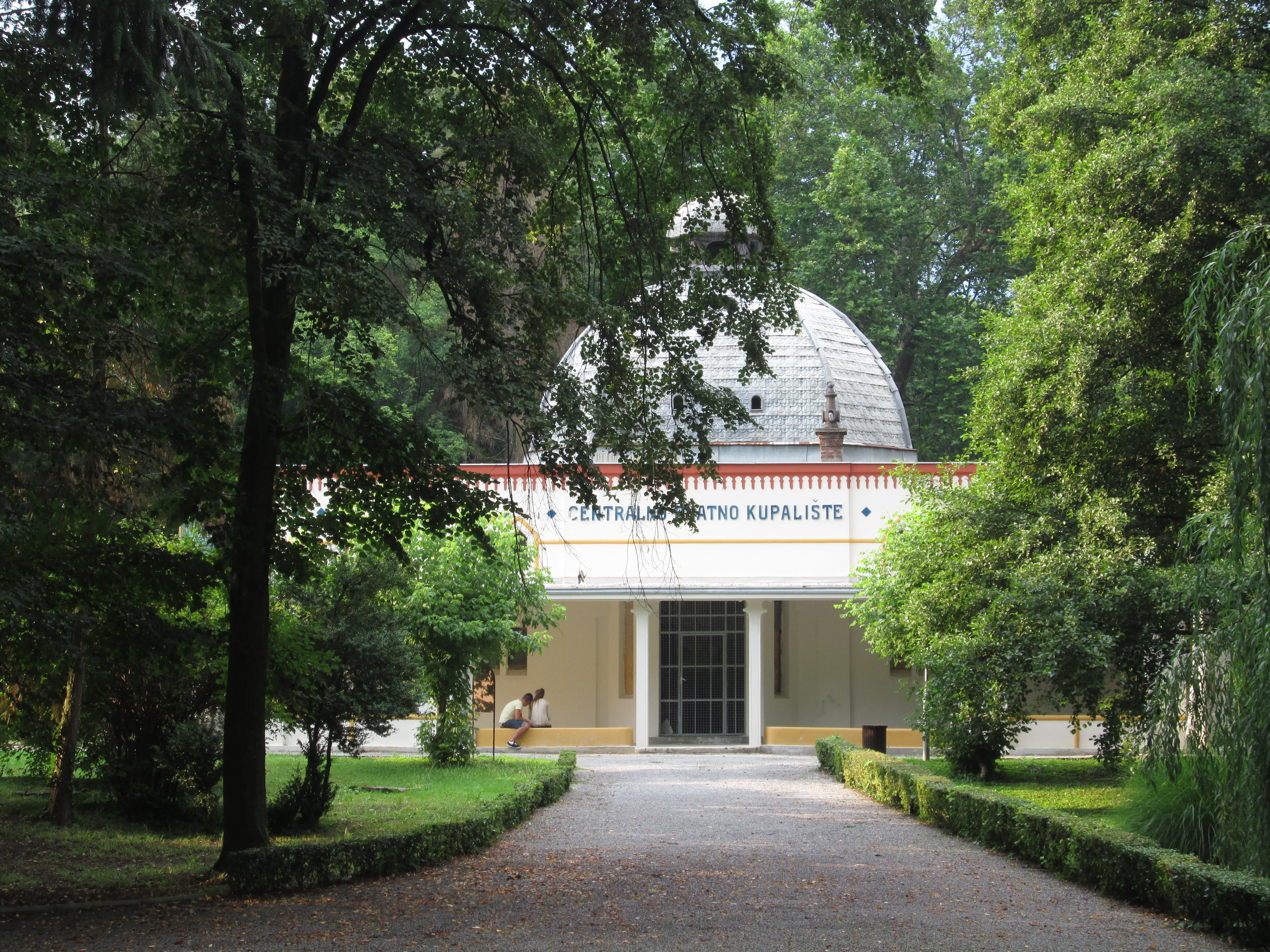
Daruvarske Toplice Park

Archaeological findings here of stone axes can be traced to the Stone Age. The history of Daruvar can be traced to the 4th century BC, when the first organized habitation developed near the warm geothermal spas in today's Daruvar valley. Celtic - Pannonian tribes living here and familiar with water treatments benefiting health, were Iassi, (meaning healers), so called by both Greek and Roman writers.

As allies of the Roman Empire, the tribes provided support to Emperor Augustus during the siege of Siscia (today's Sisak). In the year 35CE, Iassi were granted local autonomy known as Res Publica Iasorum. The center was Aquae Balissae, meaning very strong springs.

In the year 124, during the reign of Hadrian, the area gained additional autonomy as Municipium Iassorum. Stretching between the rivers Sava and Drava, on the roads which ran between Siscia-Mursa, (Sisak- Osijek), Salona–Aquincum, and Sirmium–Poetovio, the town was easy to access. After Hadrian, emperors Marcus Aurelius, Commodus, Septimius Severus, and Constantine I all visited Aquae Balissae's thermal complex, its decorated temple, its forum, and its amphitheatre (although it was smaller than the one in Pula).

After the fall of the Western Roman Empire and the destruction of local tribes by Avar Kaghanate in 6th century, this area was resettled by Croats, a Slavic tribe that reached the Balkans in 7th century.

In the 11th century the region became part of a mightier entity, that of Križevci, a rapidly growing and politically important city. It became part of the archdiocese of Zagreb mentioned by legislators for the first time in 1334.

Since the city was on a busy crossroads, there were four trading points within the valley — Četvrtkovac, Dimičkovine, Podborje, and Toplice (toplice = "spas" in Croatian). For more than a millennium, the spas continued to attract people as a destination. The population in that period was exclusively Catholic.

In the 15th and 16th centuries, all that changed. Expansion of the Ottoman Empire disrupted the steady development, and Turks occupied lands here in 1543. The Monastery of St King Ladislaus was degraded, becoming a Turkish defensive post looking into the Krajina, a military zone created to protect the Habsburg Empire just west of the city. Local people fled from Turks.

In 1699 the Habsburg Empire expelled the Turks. The ethnically mixed area came under the rule of Vienna in 1745. Podborje, Sirač, and Pakrac were bought by count Antun Janković, who in 1771 renamed Podborje as Daruvar, (daru = "crane" in Hungarian), after a building of his called the Crane's castle.

In 1837 Daruvar was declared a free city by decree of king Ferdinand I. The monarch's government recruited migrant farmers from southern Bavaria and other areas to repopulate the area and re-establish agriculture in the Danube River valley. They also recruited people skilled in crafts and trade. Germans, Hungarians, Czechs, Italians (around so called Little Italy), and others were invited to come. The government promised that they could practice their own religions (most were Catholic) and languages.

The DVD "Tvornica pumpi MPD" was founded in Daruvar in 1850.

The Daruvar Manor was renovated in 1868-1870 under the supervision of the Viennese architect Koenig.

In the late 19th and early 20th century, Daruvar was part of the Požega County of the Kingdom of Croatia-Slavonia. Parts of Daruvar's suburbs were briefly captured by militants from the Serbian Autonomous Oblast of Western Slavonia during the Croatian War of Independence.

== Climate ==
Since records began in 1978, the highest temperature recorded at the local weather station at an elevation of 152 metres (499 ft) was 40.0 °C (104.0 °F), on 10 August 2017. The coldest temperature was −25.2 °C (−13.4 °F), on 16 January 1963.

Climate data for Daruvar
| Month | Jan | Feb | Mar | Apr | May | Jun | Jul | Aug | Sep | Oct | Nov | Dec | Year |
|---|---|---|---|---|---|---|---|---|---|---|---|---|---|
| Mean daily maximum °C (°F) | 3 (37) | 6 (42) | 11 (52) | 14 (58) | 21 (69) | 23 (74) | 26 (79) | 26 (78) | 22 (71) | 16 (60) | 8 (47) | 4 (40) | 15 (59) |
| Mean daily minimum °C (°F) | −2 (29) | −1 (31) | 3 (38) | 7 (45) | 12 (54) | 15 (59) | 17 (62) | 16 (60) | 12 (54) | 8 (46) | 3 (37) | 0 (32) | 8 (46) |
| Average precipitation mm (inches) | 53 (2.1) | 53 (2.1) | 48 (1.9) | 79 (3.1) | 86 (3.4) | 110 (4.3) | 86 (3.4) | 86 (3.4) | 61 (2.4) | 69 (2.7) | 81 (3.2) | 74 (2.9) | 880 (34.7) |
Source: Weatherbase

== Demographics ==
According to the census of 2011, the population of the Daruvar municipality (township) was 11,633. In ethnic terms, 61.28% are Croats, 21.36% Czechs, 12.28% Serbs, and 0.98% Hungarians. As for the religion, 75.49% are Catholics, 10.23% Orthodox, and 7.62% are agnostics and atheists.

The Czech population is of significant size having its own newspaper, schools, societies and clubs (Česká beseda or 'Czech word', Jednota or 'Unity' in Czech), and publishing company. The entire area (Veliki Zdenci, Grubišno Polje, Končanica), is actually bilingual with Czech being the second official language. There are numerous local ethnic festivities celebrating important points in different cultures; for example youth meetings, harvest celebrations, as well as events geared toward the city's Czech community and celebration of local Czech culture.

Town of Daruvar: Population trends 1857–2021
v

| population | 2278 | 3467 | 4017 | 5031 | 5881 | 7215 | 7056 | 8078 | 9553 | 10002 | 11228 | 12355 | 13546 | 14210 | 13243 | 11633 | 10105 |
| | 1857 | 1869 | 1880 | 1890 | 1900 | 1910 | 1921 | 1931 | 1948 | 1953 | 1961 | 1971 | 1981 | 1991 | 2001 | 2011 | 2021 |

Sources: Croatian Bureau of Statistics publications

== Politics ==
=== Minority councils and representatives ===
Although though the Government of the Republic of Croatia does not guarantee official Croatian-Czech bilinguialism, the statute of Daruvar itself does. Preserving traditional Czech place names and assigning street names to Czech historical figures is legally mandated and carried out.

Directly elected minority councils and representatives are tasked with consulting tasks for the local or regional authorities in which they are advocating for minority rights and interests, integration into public life and participation in the management of local affairs. At the 2023 Croatian national minorities councils and representatives elections Czechs and Serbs of Croatia each fulfilled legal requirements to each elect their own 15 members minority council of the City of Daruvar while Hungarians were electing individual representative.

== Spas ==
Water treatments benefiting health were well known to mentioned Iassi tribes here almost 2,500 years ago, later widely used by Romans and in the Middle Ages. In 1772 the owner of the area Antun Janković started building around the springs, envisioning correctly that the town might become a healing, leisure, and recreation center again as it was through the course of history. He erected numerous buildings, many of them still functional (Anton's spa, Ivan's spa). After 1897 the newly opened railroad brought new visitors. Restaurant Teresa, Swiss villa, Villa Arcadia, and Big Mud Spa with its prominent dome and today well known city mark were all built during the turn of 19 and 20th century.

Daruvarske Toplice is a special hospital complex for rehabilitation specializing in treatment of female fertility (primary and secondary sterility), with two clinics for esthetic surgery. Warm waters (33 to 47 °C) are also used in postoperative rehabilitation, treatment of inflammations, rheumatism, the trauma of bones, hips, head, spine, and locomotion. More spas are around Pakrac and Lipik, where there is also a mineral water bottling plant. The park within the complex is positioned containing 65 different kind of trees such as a 250-year-old Ginkgo tree from China, Variegatum from Arizona, and others. Hotel Termal, renovated and extended in 1996, is also here. A smaller hotel, Balisse, is a few minutes walking distance away in the traffic-friendly downtown.

== Tourism ==
The area is rich in monuments. Historic Kistalovac, Pavlovina, Sirač, Bagenovać, Dobra Kuća, and Stupčanica are examples of numerous local castles belonging to the Croatian nobility of the times passed by. Franciscan monasteries like those of St. Margareth, St. Ana, St. Three Kings, and the Church of Holy Trinity are witnesses of the rich religious culture.

== Sports ==
The local chapter of the HPS is HPD "Vrani Kamen", which had 81 members in 1936 under the Ljubomir Vladen presidency. Membership fell to 67 in 1937. Membership rose to 78 in 1938.

== Economy ==
German people who came here in the 18th century as well as Czechs in the 19th were the keystone of the revival participating in agriculture, food processing plants, culture, and education. The development was accelerated at the turn of the century by being connected to the railroad track from Banova Jaruga to Barcs in Hungary. An important historic moment in 1897 was witnessed by the emperor Franz Joseph himself. Since 1840 a brewery is operating here producing today more than 250,000 hectoliters of beer based upon an old and famous Czech recipes, with Old Bohemian (Staročeško pivo) brand being the most known. Zdenka of Veliki Zdenci is well known for its milk and melted cheese processing plant.

Fish is cultivated in artificial lakes around Končanica and processed within Irida. Here are local high quality vines as Graševina (ranking the highest), Rhein Riesling, Chardonnay, and Sauvignon. Here fruit, maize, wheat, meat, and other agriculture products are produced for local, national, and wider markets. Dalit, created in 1905, is a metal processing plant, once one of the biggest in what was once Yugoslavia, employing today 320, but in the late 1970s almost 2,000 people. A flat glass factory is in Lipik. There are small graphics and printing (Daruvarska Tiskara d.d., Logos) facilities and the textile plant Vesna, which employs around 200. Growing is the importance of trade, tourism, and communication. 2300 people are employed, one-third of them women.

== Education ==
The first school was opened in 1856. A school for women was opened here in 1866.

== Notable people ==
- Eva Fischer - oil artist
- David Frankfurter - Croatian Jew known for assassinating Swiss branch leader of the German NSDAP Wilhelm Gustloff in 1936 in Davos, Switzerland

== See also ==
- List of Croatian municipalities with minority languages in official use

== Bibliography ==
- Herout, Vjenceslav (2016). "Prilog za povijest daruvarskog pučkog školstva za drugu polovinu 19. stoljeća" [A contribution for the history of Daruvar folk schooling for the second half of the 19th century] (PDF). Zbornik Janković (in Croatian). I (1). Matica hrvatska, Daruvar branch: 51–72.
