= Škropeti =

Škropeti Scropetti
- Village
- Location within Croatia
- Coordinates: 45.2748188°N 13.8281232°E
- Country: Croatia
- County: Istria County
- Municipality: Karojba

Area
  - Total: 3.3 sq mi (8.6 km^{2})

Population (2021)
  - Total: 431
  - Density: 130/sq mi (50/km^{2})
- Time zone: UTC+1 (CET)
  - Summer (DST): UTC+2 (CEST)
- Postal code: 52423 Karojba
- Area code: 052

Škropeti (Italian: Scropetti) is a village in the municipality of Karojba in Istria, Croatia.

== History ==
On 1 August 2021, a tornado of intensity IF2 and maximum width 200 metres (660 ft) touched down at Gambetići, travelling 7.3 kilometres (4.5 mi) through Fabci to Livaki by Škropeti.

== Demographics ==
According to the 2021 census, its population was 431.

== Natural landmarks ==
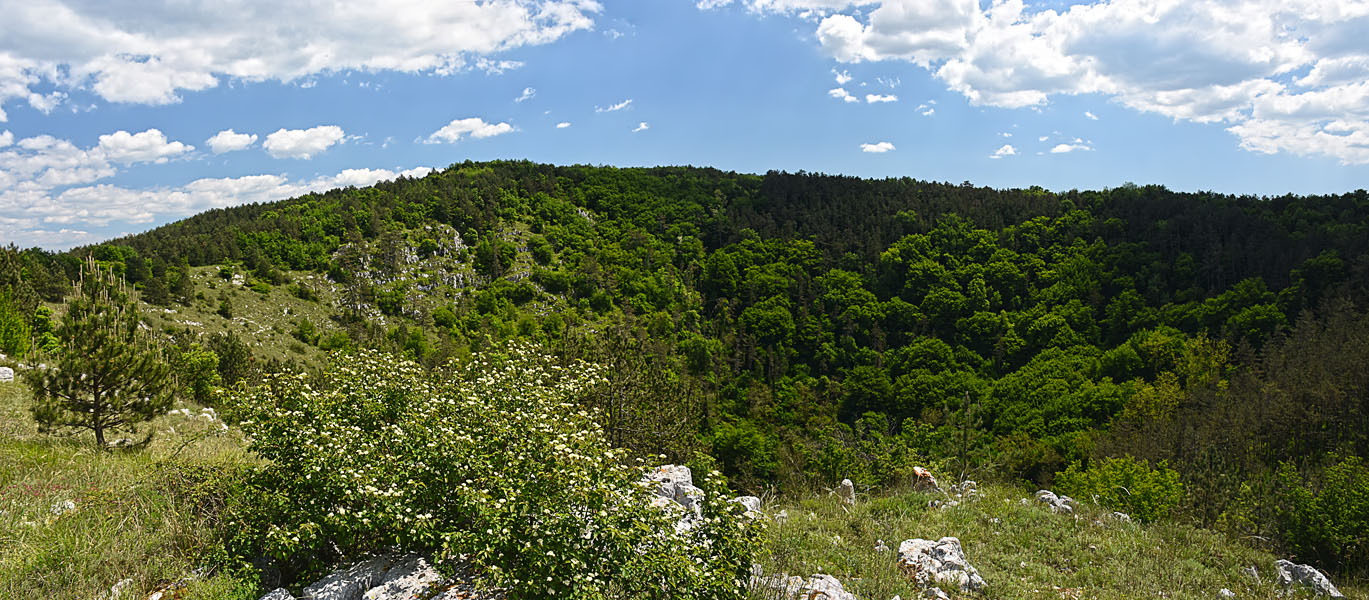
Sopajac sinkhole

Sopajac (Veli dol), situated SW of the village is the biggest sinkhole in Istria.
