= Krndija, Osijek-Baranja County =

Krndija
- Village (Selo)
- Location within Osijek-Baranja County Location within Croatia
- Coordinates: 45.45°N 18.38°E
- Country: Croatia
- County: Osijek-Baranja
- Municipality: Punitovci

Area
  - Total: 17.9 km^{2} (6.9 sq mi)

Population (2021)
  - Total: 39
  - Density: 2.2/km^{2} (5.6/sq mi)
- Postal code: 31424 Punitovci
- Vehicle registration: DJ

Krndija is a village in eastern Croatia, part of the municipality of Punitovci, population 64 (2011).
