= Vrbovac, Daruvar =

Vrbovac
- Village
- Location within Croatia
- Coordinates: 45.5895894°N 17.2322885°E
- Country: Croatia
- County: Bjelovar-Bilogora County
- Municipality: Daruvar

Area
  - Total: 2.1 sq mi (5.5 km^{2})

Population (2021)
  - Total: 508
  - Density: 240/sq mi (92/km^{2})
- Time zone: UTC+1 (CET)
  - Summer (DST): UTC+2 (CEST)

Vrbovac is a village in Croatia.

== Demographics ==
According to the 2021 census, its population was 508.
