= Karojba =

Karojba Caroiba del Subiente
- Municipality
- Karojba Municipality
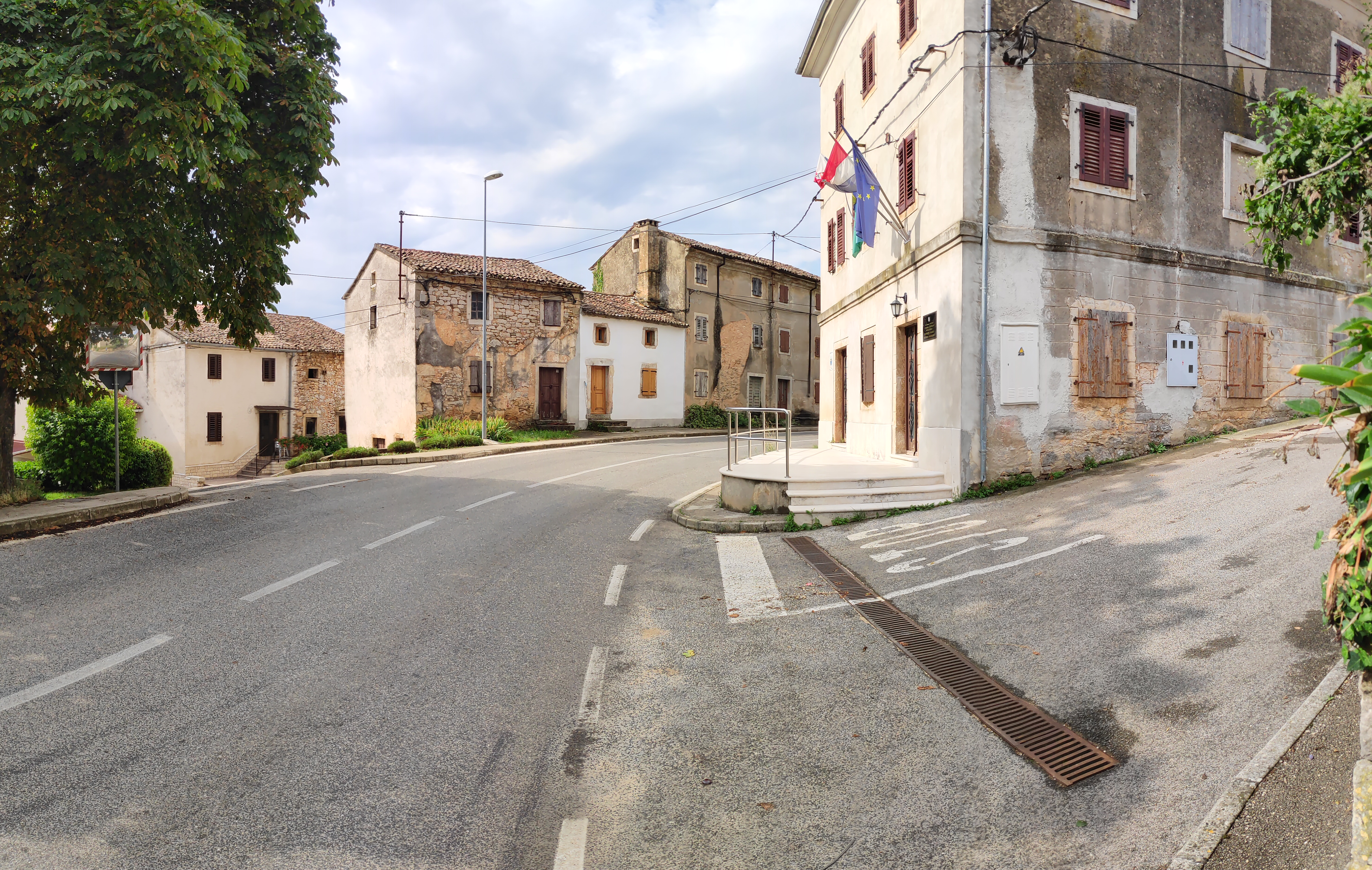

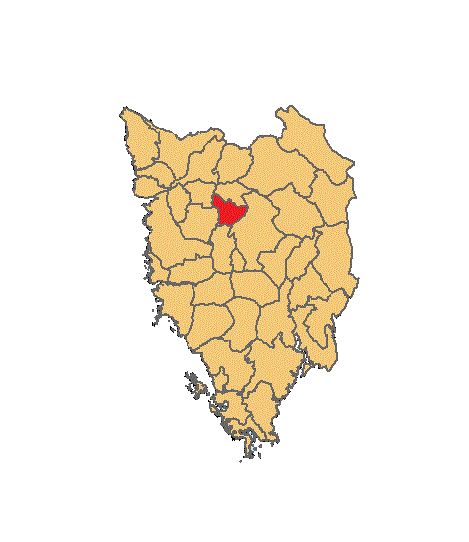
- Location of Karojba municipality in Istria
- Interactive map of Karojba
- Location within Croatia
- Coordinates: 45°18′N 13°49′E
- Country: Croatia
- County: Istria County

Government
  - Mayor: Marko Lakošeljac

Area
  - Municipality: 13.4 sq mi (34.7 km^{2})
  - Urban: 4.7 sq mi (12.1 km^{2})

Population (2021)
  - Municipality: 1,404
  - Density: 105/sq mi (40.5/km^{2})
  - Urban: 413
  - Urban density: 88.4/sq mi (34.1/km^{2})
- Time zone: UTC+1 (CET)
  - Summer (DST): UTC+2 (CEST)
- Postal code: 52424 Motovun
- Area code: 052
- Website: karojba.hr

Karojba (Italian: Caroiba del Subiente) is a village and municipality in Istria, Croatia located 18 km north-west of Pazin.

== Demographics ==
According to the Croatian 2021 census, the whole of Karojba Municipality has 1,404 inhabitants, while the settlement of Karojba proper has 413 inhabitants. The population was 1,438 in 2011.

In 2021, the municipality consisted of the following settlements:

- Karojba, population 413
- Novaki Motovunski, population 373
- Rakotule, population 187
- Škropeti, population 431
Karojba: Population trends 1857–2021
v

population	1233	1275	1371	1560	1596	1809	1892	2047	2140	2131	1801	1573	1558	1470	1489	1438	1404
	1857	1869	1880	1890	1900	1910	1921	1931	1948	1953	1961	1971	1981	1991	2001	2011	2021

Sources: Croatian Bureau of Statistics publications
