= Fabci, Croatia =

Fabci Fabaz
- Village
- Location within Croatia
- Coordinates: 45.244323°N 13.7579532°E
- Country: Croatia
- County: Istria County
- Municipality: Višnjan

Area
  - Total: 0.69 sq mi (1.8 km^{2})

Population (2021)
  - Total: 45
  - Density: 65/sq mi (25/km^{2})
- Time zone: UTC+1 (CET)
  - Summer (DST): UTC+2 (CEST)
- Postal code: 52463 Višnjan
- Area code: 052

Fabci (Italian: Fabaz) is a village in Višnjan-Visignano municipality in Istria County, Croatia.

== History ==
On 1 August 2021, a tornado of intensity IF2 and maximum width 200 metres (660 ft) touched down at Gambetići, travelling 7.3 kilometres (4.5 mi) through Fabci to Livaki by Škropeti.

== Demographics ==
According to the 2021 census, its population was 45.
