= Rakotule =

Village in Croatia

Rakotule Raccotole di Montona
- Village
- Location within Croatia
- Coordinates: 45°18′N 13°48′E
- Country: Croatia
- County: Istria County
- Municipality: Karojba

Area
  - Total: 2.6 sq mi (6.7 km^{2})

Population (2021)
  - Total: 187
  - Density: 72/sq mi (28/km^{2})
- Time zone: UTC+1 (CET)
  - Summer (DST): UTC+2 (CEST)
- Postal code: 52424 Motovun
- Area code: 052

Rakotule (Italian: Raccotole di Montona) is a village in the Republic of Croatia, part of the Municipality of Karojba, Istria County.

== Demographics ==
According to the 2021 census, its population was 187 inhabitants.
