= Farini, Croatia =

Farini
- Village
- Location within Croatia
- Coordinates: 45°16′20″N 13°42′5″E
- Country: Croatia
- County: Istria County
- Municipality: Višnjan

Population (2021)
  - Total: 48
- Time zone: UTC+1 (CET)
  - Summer (DST): UTC+2 (CEST)
- Postal code: 52463
- Area code: (+385) 52

Farini is a village in the municipality of Višnjan, Istria County, Croatia, 10 kilometres from the Western Croatian coast.

== Demographics ==
According to the 2021 census, its population was 48. It was 53 in 2011. In the 1991 census, Farini's population of 51 was demographically made up of 35% Croats, 25% Italians, 6% Hungarians and 33% other ethnicities. According to one source, Farini has occasional floods and earthquakes.
