= Markovac, Bjelovar-Bilogora County =

Markovac
- Village
- Location within Croatia
- Country: Croatia
- County: Bjelovar-Bilogora County
- Municipality: Daruvar

Area
  - Total: 4.9 sq mi (12.7 km^{2})

Population (2021)
  - Total: 71
  - Density: 14/sq mi (5.6/km^{2})
- Time zone: UTC+1 (CET)
  - Summer (DST): UTC+2 (CEST)

Markovac is a village in the Slavonia region of Croatia, located east of Daruvar.

== History ==
Before the breakup of Yugoslavia in 1991, the village was primarily inhabited by Serbs, with only one half-Croatian, half-Serbian family. The Serbian population left the village in December 1991, during the war. Since then, a few Croatian families have moved in from Bosnia and Herzegovina. From 1997 onwards, Serbian families started selling their properties to the Croatian Government or new settlers from Bosnia and Herzegovina for small amounts of money.

Most of the pre-war population of the village lives outside Croatia. The majority live in Serbia, with a few families in Germany, Bosnia and Herzegovina, the United States, and Australia.

Before the war, Markovac had a primary school up to grade four. The teacher was Nikola Fasaic, a former Catholic priest from Sirač. After the fourth grade, the children went to school in Daruvar.

== Religion ==
After World War II people joined or supported the Communist Party of Yugoslavia, so some of the Serbs didn't follow the religion of their fathers. But people would still celebrate their Slava (patron saint), and the priest would go through the village and be invited into the house by the householder to celebrate his Slava.

The population was Serbian Orthodox; the village didn't have a church, so some people went to the Serbian Orthodox church in Bijela. That church was burned to the ground after the Serbian population left in December 1991.

Since 1991 there are Roman Catholics in the village. The Serbian people attend the Serbian Orthodox church in Daruvar.

== Demographics ==
According to the 2021 census, its population was 71. It was 80 in 2011.
