= Antonci, Poreč =

Antonci
- Village
- Location within Croatia
- Country: Croatia
- County: Istria County
- Municipality: Poreč

Area
  - Total: 0.93 sq mi (2.4 km^{2})

Population (2021)
  - Total: 230
  - Density: 250/sq mi (96/km^{2})
- Time zone: UTC+1 (CET)
  - Summer (DST): UTC+2 (CEST)
- Postal code: 52440 Poreč
- Area code: 052

Antonci is a small village close to Poreč in the Croatian region of Istria (Istria County).

== Demographics ==
According to the 2021 census, its population was 230. The population was 164 in 2011.

== See also ==
- Barbariga, Croatia
