= Štuti =

Štuti Stuti
- Village
- Location within Croatia
- Coordinates: 45.2866325°N 13.7287739°E
- Country: Croatia
- County: Istria County
- Municipality: Višnjan

Area
  - Total: 0.23 sq mi (0.6 km^{2})

Population (2021)
  - Total: 20
  - Density: 86/sq mi (33/km^{2})
- Time zone: UTC+1 (CET)
  - Summer (DST): UTC+2 (CEST)
- Postal code: 52463 Višnjan
- Area code: 052

Štuti (Italian: Stuti) is a village in Višnjan-Visignano municipality in Istria County, Croatia.

== Demographics ==
According to the 2021 census, its population was 20.
