= Diklići, Croatia =

Diklići Decli
- Village
- Location within Croatia
- Coordinates: 45.2853378°N 13.768777°E
- Country: Croatia
- County: Istria County
- Municipality: Višnjan

Area
  - Total: 0.19 sq mi (0.5 km^{2})

Population (2021)
  - Total: 50
  - Density: 260/sq mi (100/km^{2})
- Time zone: UTC+1 (CET)
  - Summer (DST): UTC+2 (CEST)
- Postal code: 52463 Višnjan
- Area code: 052

Diklići (Italian: Decli) is a village in Višnjan-Visignano municipality in Istria County, Croatia.

== Demographics ==
According to the 2021 census, its population was 50.
