= Punitovci =

Punitovci Punitovci (Slovak)
- Municipality
- Location within Osijek-Baranja County Location within Croatia
- Coordinates: 45.43°N 18.42°E
- Country: Croatia
- Region: Slavonia
- County: Osijek-Baranja County

Area
  - Municipality: 40.6 km^{2} (15.7 sq mi)
  - Urban: 10.2 km^{2} (3.9 sq mi)

Population (2021)
  - Municipality: 1,562
  - Density: 38.5/km^{2} (99.6/sq mi)
  - Urban: 566
  - Urban density: 55.5/km^{2} (144/sq mi)
- Website: punitovci.hr

Punitovci (Slovak: Punitovci, Hungarian: Panyit) is a municipality in Osijek-Baranja County, Croatia. There are a total of 1,803 inhabitants.

In the 2011 census, 62% were Croats and 37% were Slovaks.

The population is distributed in four settlements:

- Josipovac Punitovački
- Jurjevac Punitovački
- Krndija
- Punitovci

== Politics ==
=== Minority councils ===
Directly elected minority councils and representatives are tasked with consulting the local or regional authorities where they advocate for minority rights and interests, integration into public life and participation in the management of local affairs. At the 2023 Croatian national minorities councils and representatives elections, Slovaks of Croatia fulfilled the legal requirements to elect 10 members municipal minority councils of the Punitovci Municipality.

In November 2023, the Government of the Republic of Croatia decided to declare an end to mandatory bilingualism in Punitovci on the basis of the 2021 census, which showed the Slovak population fraction had fallen below the required one third, at 33.16%. While this did impact funding, the existence of guarantees at the municipal level prevented any change. Preserving traditional Slovak place names and assigning street names to Slovak historical figures is legally mandated, but not carried out. Almost uniquely among all municipalities in Croatia where it is mandated (along with the Serbs of Udbina), neither minority national symbols nor holidays are officially celebrated.
