= Doljani, Bjelovar-Bilogora County =

Doljani
- Village
- Location within Croatia
- Coordinates: 45.5603304°N 17.2039039°E
- Country: Croatia
- County: Bjelovar-Bilogora County
- Municipality: Daruvar

Area
  - Total: 3.8 sq mi (9.9 km^{2})

Population (2021)
  - Total: 650
  - Density: 170/sq mi (66/km^{2})
- Time zone: UTC+1 (CET)
  - Summer (DST): UTC+2 (CEST)

Doljani is a village in Croatia.

== Demographics ==
According to the 2021 census, its population was 650.
