= Markovac, Istria County =

Markovac San Marco
- Village
- Location within Croatia
- Coordinates: 45.2934552°N 13.6991626°E
- Country: Croatia
- County: Istria County
- Municipality: Višnjan

Area
  - Total: 0.54 sq mi (1.4 km^{2})

Population (2021)
  - Total: 155
  - Density: 290/sq mi (110/km^{2})
- Time zone: UTC+1 (CET)
  - Summer (DST): UTC+2 (CEST)
- Postal code: 52463 Višnjan
- Area code: 052

Markovac (Italian: San Marco) is a village in Višnjan-Visignano municipality in Istria County, Croatia.

== Demographics ==
According to the 2021 census, its population was 155.
