= Jelisavac =

- Village (Selo)
- Location within Osijek-Baranja County Location within Croatia Location within Europe
- Country: Croatia
- County: Osijek-Baranja

Area
  - Total: 8.6 sq mi (22.4 km^{2})

Population (2021)
  - Total: 1,024
  - Density: 118/sq mi (45.7/km^{2})
- Time zone: UTC+1 (CET)
  - Summer (DST): UTC+2 (CEST)

Jelisavac is a village in Croatia. It is connected by the D2 highway.
