= Josipovac Punitovački =

Josipovac Punitovački Josipovec Punitovský
- Village (Selo)
- Location within Croatia
- Coordinates: 45.424°N 18.411°E
- Country: Croatia
- County: Osijek-Baranja County
- Municipality: Punitovci

Area
  - Total: 6.6 km^{2} (2.5 sq mi)

Population (2021)
  - Total: 693
  - Density: 110/km^{2} (270/sq mi)
- Time zone: UTC+1 (CET)
  - Summer (DST): UTC+2 (CEST)

Josipovac Punitovački (Slovak: Josipovec Punitovský) is a village in Croatia, part of the municipality of Punitovci, population 787 (2011). The village is majority Slovak (~70%).
