= NK Vihor Jelisavac =

Croatian football club

- Full name: Nogometni klub Vihor Jelisavac
- Founded: 1962
- Ground: Koreja
- Chairman: Ivan Komak
- League: Treća HNL East
Home colours

NK Vihor Jelisavac is a football club from Jelisavac, Osijek-Baranja County, Croatia, currently playing in the third division Treća HNL.

== History ==
Vihor were founded in 1962.

=== 2018–19 season ===
Vihor were promoted to the 3rd division in 2018 after finishing second in the 4th division. They started their 2018–19 campaign well having invested to upgrade their squad after the promotion, including hiring players from Hungary. Vihor finished in fourth place in the 3rd division heading into the 2018–19 winter break, having six wins and a draw at their home Koreja sports ground.
