= Višnjan =

Višnjan Visignano
- Municipality
- Višnjan Municipality; Općina Višnjan - Comune di Visignano
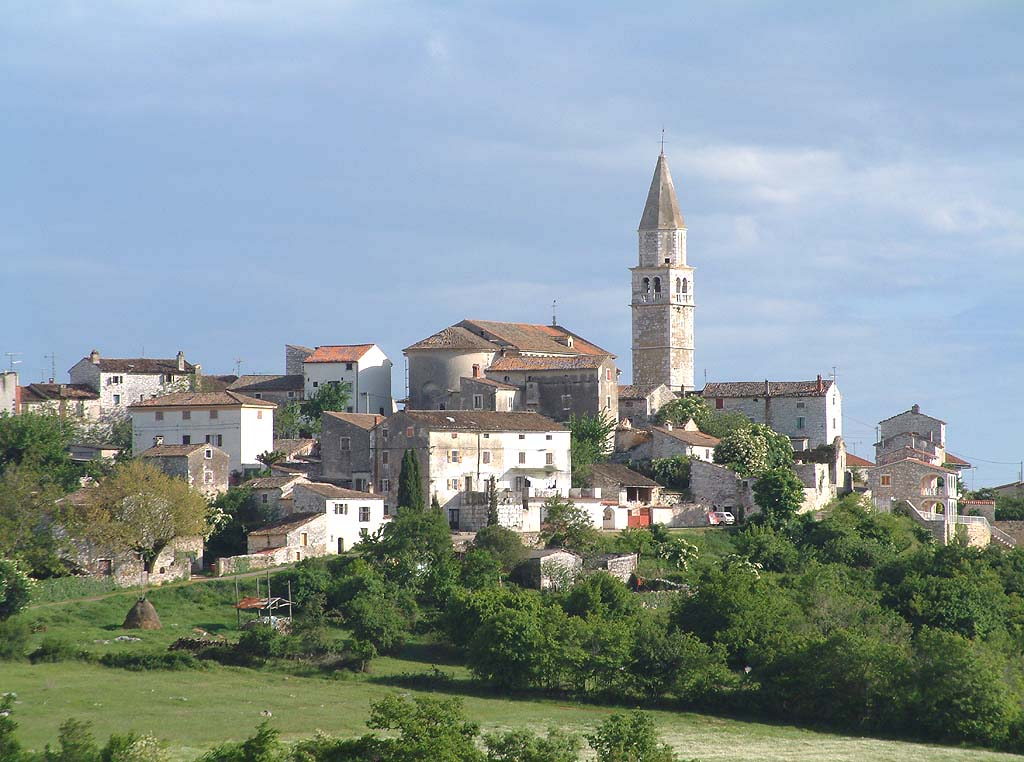

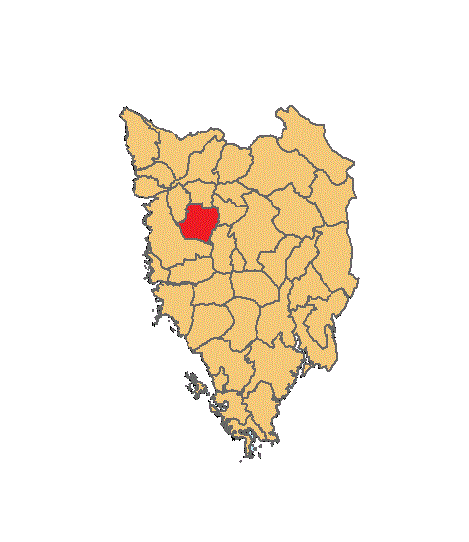
- Location of Višnjan in Istria
- Interactive map of Višnjan
- Location within Croatia
- Coordinates: 45°16′39″N 13°43′34″E
- Country: Croatia
- County: Istria County

Government
  - Mayor: Angelo Mattich

Area
  - Municipality: 24.5 sq mi (63.5 km^{2})
  - Urban: 0.50 sq mi (1.3 km^{2})

Population (2021)
  - Municipality: 2,096
  - Density: 85.5/sq mi (33.0/km^{2})
  - Urban: 664
  - Urban density: 1,300/sq mi (510/km^{2})
- Time zone: UTC+1 (CET)
  - Summer (DST): UTC+2 (CEST)
- Postal code: 52440 Poreč
- Area code: 52
- Website: visnjan.hr

Višnjan (Italian: Visignano) is a village and municipality in Istria, west Croatia. Višnjan is the site of Višnjan Observatory (an astronomical observatory). The observatory is home of several long-running international summer programs for youth in astronomy, archeology, marine biology and other disciplines.

== Geography ==
Višnjan is located 12 kilometers east of Poreč and 3 kilometers west of Pula-Koper road. Višnjan is located on elevation of 244 m and average municipality elevation is between 200-300 m. One of the most notable sinkholes in Istria, Baredine, is located in the municipality.

== Demographics ==
According to the 2021 census, its population was 2,096 with 664 living in the village of Višnjan itself.

The municipality consists of the following 56 settlements:

- Anžići, population 52
- Babudri, population 5
- Bačva, population 16
- Barat, population 21
- Barići, population 27
- Baškoti, population 51
- Benčani, population 18
- Bokići, population 17
- Broskvari, population 16
- Bucalovići, population 1
- Bujarići, population 0
- Butori, population 3
- Cerion, population 44
- Cvitani, population 20
- Deklevi, population 15
- Diklići, population 50
- Fabci, population 45
- Farini, population 48
- Gambetići, population 15
- Kelci, population 0
- Kočići, population 18
- Kolumbera, population 28
- Korlevići, population 18
- Košutići, population 15
- Kurjavići, population 21
- Legovići, population 12
- Majkusi, population 18
- Mališi, population 11
- Maretići, population 0
- Markovac, population 155
- Milanezi, population 18
- Prašćari, population 10
- Prhati, population 59
- Prkovići, population 0
- Pršurići, population 45
- Radoši kod Višnjana, population 48
- Radovani, population 32
- Rafaeli, population 9
- Rapavel, population 89
- Ribarići, population 0
- Sinožići, population 59
- Smolici, population 39
- Srebrnići, population 8
- Strpačići, population 31
- Sveti Ivan, population 16
- Štuti, population 20
- Tićan, population 15
- Tripari, population 19
- Vejaki, population 17
- Višnjan, population 664
- Vranići kod Višnjana, population 41
- Vrhjani, population 13
- Zoričići, population 26
- Ženodraga, population 22
- Žikovići, population 12
- Žužići, population 24
Višnjan: Population trends 1857–2021
v

population	1900	2095	3014	3533	4195	4683	3947	3846	4078	3639	3186	2736	2416	2252	2187	2274	2096
	1857	1869	1880	1890	1900	1910	1921	1931	1948	1953	1961	1971	1981	1991	2001	2011	2021

Sources: Croatian Bureau of Statistics publications

According to the 2001 census Višnjan had a population of 625 with a total municipal population of 2,187 of which 71.7% were Croats, 9.1% were Italians and 6.2% declared themselves as Istrians. Like most settlements in Istrian interior Višnjan is experiencing depopulation in the last decades as people are migrating towards the coast.

=== Language ===
According to the 1921 census, the majority of the population were Italian speakers.

Preserving traditional Italian place names and assigning street names to Italian historical figures is legally mandated and carried out.

== History ==
In the village of Strpačići, 1 km from Višnjan copper earrings and needles were found. Illyrians came to the region somewhere between 2000 and 1000 BC and were later replaced by Celts. The remains of the Celtic era can be found on the nearby Montemez hill which is Celtic for nice hill. Remnants of pottery can be found all over the area as well in the town itself. A few kilometers west from Višnjan there is a prehistoric and medieval settlement called Dilian with a monastery and church named Saint Mihovil dating from the 11th century. Višnjan was first mentioned in a document from 1003 AD. Višnjan was surrounded by a defense wall until the 18th century. The City was entered through a gate crowned with a Venetian lion and an open book. Višnjan was part of the Motovun municipality until 1847 when it became an independent municipality. It was subsequently incorporated into Poreč municipality in 1947. In 1976 an astronomical observatory was built in Višnjan and the town became the astronomy centre of Yugoslavia. In 1993 Višnjan again became an independent municipality.

Višnjan is partially surrounded by walls built in the 13th and 14th centuries, and in the town there is a Gothic church of St. Anton from the 15th century and the church of St. Quirik and Julita from the 19th century.

== Economy ==
Most of Višnjan's economy comes from agriculture mostly olive growing and viticulture. Višnjan is also known as one of the last resorts in Istria of autochthon Istrian bovine Boškarin. Boškarin, the first geno-park in Croatia, was founded With the intention of preserving Boškarin in Višnjan. Most of the people work on the coast and travel daily to work.
