= D49 road (Croatia) =

Road in Croatia

D49 state road

Route information
- Length: 19.0 km (11.8 mi)

Major junctions
- From: D38 in Pleternica
- To: A3 in Lužani interchange

Location
- Country: Croatia
- Counties: Požega-Slavonia, Brod-Posavina
- Major cities: Pleternica

Highway system
- Highways in Croatia

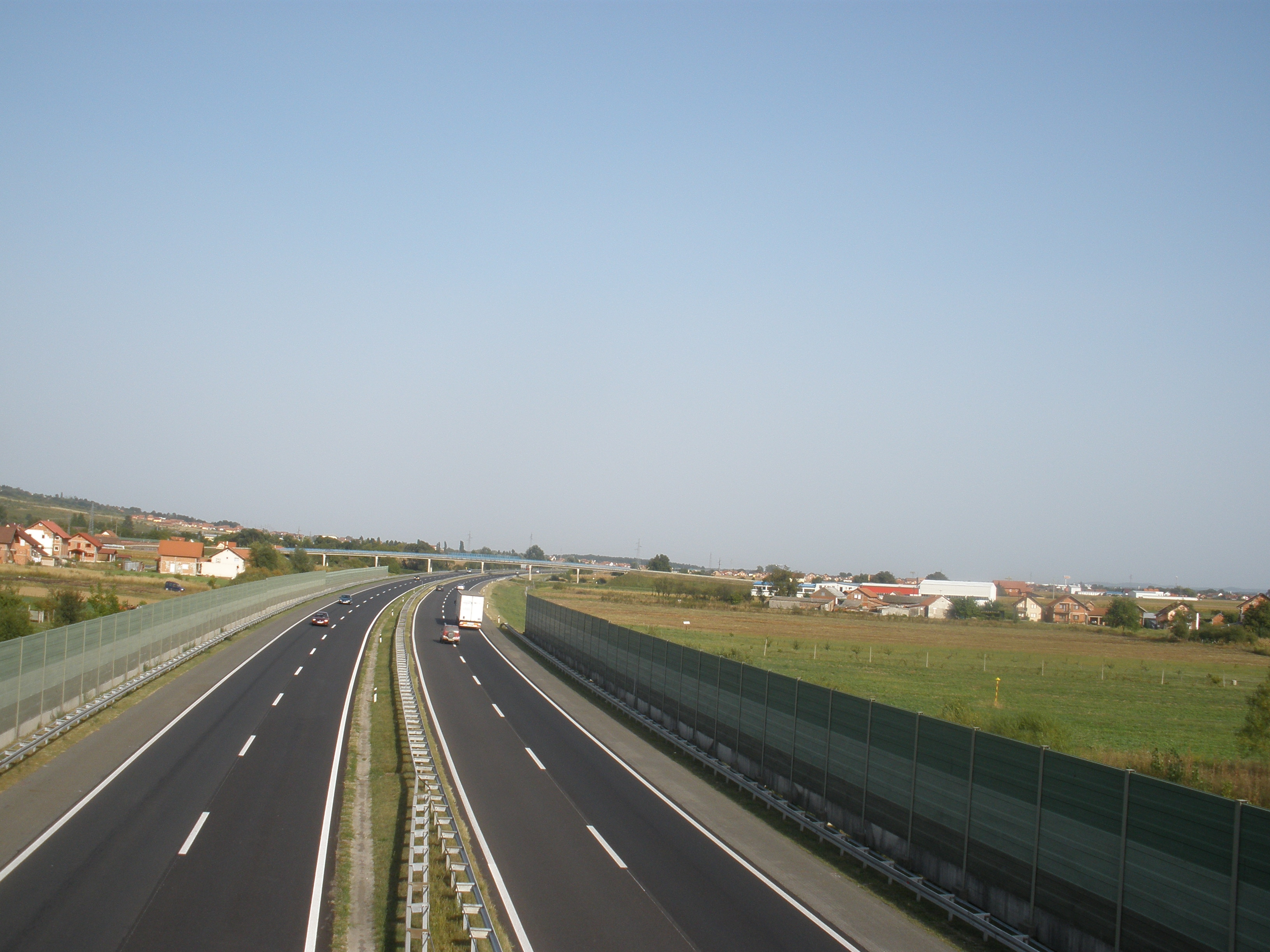
The D49 road links Pleternica to the A3 motorway

D49 is a state road in the Slavonia region of Croatia that connects the A3 motorway's Lužani interchange to the D38 state road, facilitating access from the A3 motorway to Pleternica and its surroundings. The road is 19.0 km long.

The road, as well as all other state roads in Croatia, is managed and maintained by Hrvatske Ceste, state owned company.

== Traffic volume ==
Traffic is regularly counted and reported by Hrvatske Ceste, operator of the road.

D49 traffic volume
| Road | Counting site | AADT | ASDT | Notes |
| D49 | 3509 Batrina north | 1,275 | 1,574 | Between Ž4185 and Ž4158 junctions. |

== Road junctions and populated areas ==
D49 junctions
| Type | Slip roads/Notes |
| | Pleternica; D38 to Požega (to the west) and to Đakovo (to the east). D525 to Slavonski Brod. The northern terminus of the road. |
| | Bresnica |
| | Sulkovci |
| | Ratkovica |
| | Dragovci; Ž4185 to Brodski Drenovac and Bilice. |
| | Batrina; Ž4158 to Vrbova, Staro Petrovo Selo and Nova Gradiška. |
| | Ž4244 to Lužani, Oriovac and Stari Slatinik. |
| | Lužani interchange. A3 to Zagreb (to the west) and to Slavonski Brod(to the east). Southern terminus of the road. |

== See also ==
- A3 motorway
