= D525 road =

Road in Croatia

D525 state road

Route information
- Length: 25.6 km (15.9 mi)

Major junctions
- From: D49 in Pleternica
- A3 in Slavonski Brod zapad (west) interchange
- To: D53 in Slavonski Brod

Location
- Country: Croatia
- Counties: Požega-Slavonia, Brod-Posavina
- Major cities: Pleternica, Slavonski Brod

Highway system
- Highways in Croatia

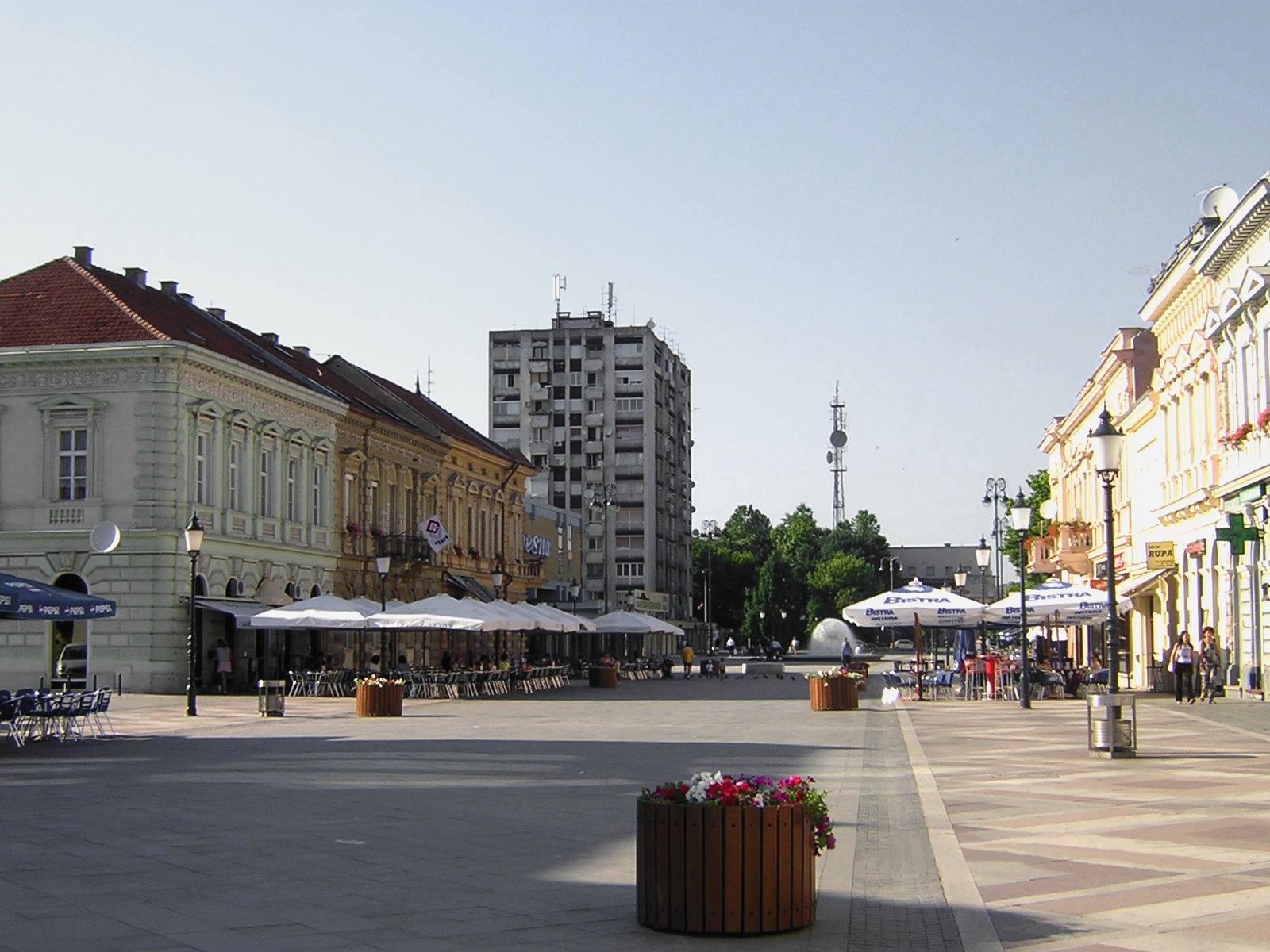
Slavonski Brod, at the southern terminus of the D525 road

D525 is a state road in the Slavonia region of Croatia that connects the A3 motorway's Slavonski Brod zapad (west) interchange to the D53 and D49 state roads, facilitating access from the A3 motorway to Slavonski Brod form the west and to Pleternica. The road is 25.6 km long.

The road, as well as all other state roads in Croatia, is managed and maintained by Hrvatske Ceste, state owned company.

== Traffic volume ==
Traffic is regularly counted and reported by Hrvatske Ceste, operator of the road.

D525 traffic volume
Road	Counting site	AADT	ASDT	Notes
D525	3508 Krajačići	2,038	2,325	Between Ž4162 and Ž4244 junctions.

== Road junctions and populated areas ==
D525 junctions
Type	Slip roads/Notes
	Pleternica; D49 to Batrina (to the south) and to the centre of Pleternica and D38 state road (to the north) which in turn leads to Požega and Đakovo. The D38 junction is approximately 200 m (660 ft) to the north. The northern terminus of the road.
	Frkljevci
	Kadanovci
	Bilice; Ž4162 to Ravan and Brodski Zdenci. Ž4185 to Brodski Drenovac and Dragovci.
	Grižići
	Krajačići
	Stari Slatinik; Ž4244 to Oriovac and Lužani.
	Gornji Andrijevci
	Sibinj
	Bartolovci; Ž4202 to Brodski Varoš, Garčin and Strizivojna.
	Slobodnica
	Slavonski Brod zapad (west) interchange. A3 to Zagreb (to the west) and to Županja (to the east).
	Slavonski Brod; D53 to Slavonski Brod border crossing to Bosanski Brod, Bosnia and Herzegovina (to the south) and to Čaglin and Našice (to the north). Southern terminus of the road.

== See also ==
- A3 motorway
