= Mihaljević =

Mihaljević or Mihaljevic is a surname, a patronymic of Mihael or Mihovil.

Notable people with the surname include:

- Amy Mihaljevic (1978–1989), American elementary school student kidnapped and murdered in Ohio
- Branko Mihaljević (1931–2005), composer, writer, journalist and radio editor
- Filip Mihaljević (shot putter) (born 1994), Croatian discus thrower and shot putter
- Filip Mihaljević (footballer, born 1992), Croatian football forward
- Filip Mihaljević (footballer, born 2000), Croatian football midfielder
- George Mihaljević (born 1936), Croatian-American former football player and coach
- Igor Mihaljević (born 1979), Croatian heavyweight kickboxer
- Joe Mihaljevic (born 1960), American retired soccer forward
- Mihailo Mihaljević (1748–1794), Austrian colonel who led the Serbian Free Corps during the Austro-Turkish War (1788-1791)
- Radoslav Mihaljević (1426–1436), Serbian magnate in the service of Despots Stefan Lazarević and Đurađ Branković

== See also ==
- Branko Mihaljević Children's Theatre, a theatre located in Osijek, Croatia
- Mihaljevići (disambiguation)
- Mihajlović
- Maljević
- Miljević
