= Starci =

Starci may refer to:

- Starci, Serbia, a village near Aleksandrovac
- Starci, Croatia, a village near Staro Petrovo Selo
- Stârci, a village near Costeşti, Romania
