= Kalinić =

Kalinić (Serbian Cyrillic: Калинић, pronounced [kǎlinitɕ]) is a surname found in Croatia and Serbia. It may refer to:

People

- Ivica Kalinić (b. 1956), former Croatian football player and manager
- Lovre Kalinić (b. 1990), Croatian footballer
- Nikola Kalinić (footballer) (b. 1988), Croatian footballer
- Nikola Kalinić (basketball) (b. 1991), Serbian basketballer
- Pavle Kalinić (b. 1959), Croatian politician and writer
- Sretko Kalinić (b. 1974), Serbian gangster
- Tamara Kalinic (b. 1989), Serbian fashion model and blogger
- Zoran Kalinić (b. 1958), former Yugoslav table tennis player

Places

- Kalinić, Požega-Slavonia County, a village in eastern Croatia
