= Andrija Štampar =

Croatian scholar (1888 - 1958)

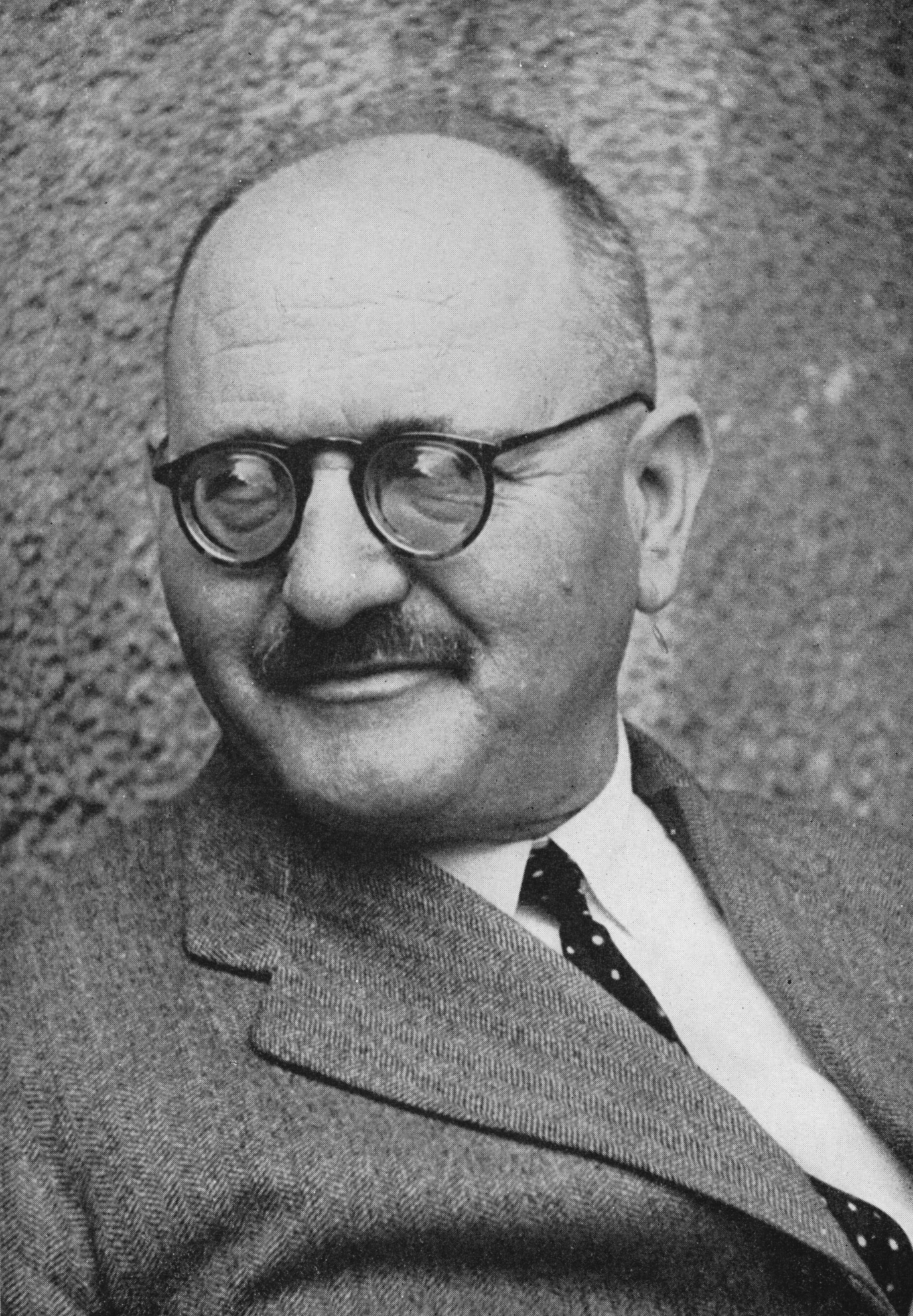
- Štampar in 1939
- Born: 1 September 1888; Brodski Drenovac, Kingdom of Croatia-Slavonia, Austria-Hungary
- Died: 26 June 1958 (aged 69); Zagreb, PR Croatia, FPR Yugoslavia
- Occupation: Physician
- Writing career
- Notable awards: Leon Bernard Foundation Prize and Medal; 1955

Andrija Štampar (1 September 1888 – 26 June 1958) was a distinguished scholar in the field of social medicine from Croatia.

== Education ==
Štampar was born on 1 September 1888 in Brodski Drenovac (part of Pleternica), at the time part of the Austro-Hungarian Empire, in modern Požega-Slavonia County. From 1898 to 1906, he attended grammar school in Vinkovci. During his secondary schooling, Štampar was a brilliant pupil and, at that time, he wrote his first literary attempt, published in the periodical Pobratim in 1902. He enrolled at the medical school in Vienna in 1906, which was at the time the most important medical center in the world. As a medical student, he initiated the editing of medical papers and wrote pamphlets and articles to educate people in health matters. In 1909, in Nova Gradiška, he started publishing the Public Health Library series, discussing numerous health and prevention topics. On 23 December 1911, he was awarded the Doctor of General Medicine (doctor medicinae universae).

== Career ==
On 1 January 1912, Štampar started working at the town hospital at Karlovac and remained at this post until 8 August 1913. He enrolled in the Croatian Medical Association, an organization of physicians, and published a few articles in their journal.

By a decree of the Župan (Prefect) of the Požega District, he was appointed district health officer of Nova Gradiška in 1913. In 1919, he attended the Congress of Inter-Allied Countries for Social Hygiene in Paris, lecturing on children's health. At that time, he had a clear concept of organizing the public health service. Andrija Štampar is universally known as "the man of action".

At age 31, he was named principal of Belgrade's Department of Public Health. Thanks to Štampar's endeavours, a special Institute of Social Medicine affiliated with the University of Zagreb School of Medicine was founded. From 1924, he was a member of several international expert committees, which, through his efforts, received grants from the Rockefeller Foundation.

King Alexander's dictatorship suddenly put a stop to his work at the Ministry of Public Health in 1930, and, in 1931, he was put on the retired list by the King's decree and came into personal conflict with King Alexander due to his refusal to enter the government. He was offered the portfolio of the Minister of the Interior, but he refused and asked for free elections as a condition.

== International activities ==
From 1931 to 1933, Štampar was permanently employed as the Health Organization of the League of Nations expert. He entered upon a new kind of work; study travels, extensive lecturing in different parts of the world, and confronting health problems at the international level. From October 1931 until January 1932, Štampar was in the United States and Canada as the guest of the Rockefeller Foundation. The League of Nations also entrusted him with the task of acquainting himself with the work of a special American Committee dealing with the costs of medical care.

He also spent time in China, from 1933 to 1936. The Health Organization sent him as an advisor to help the Chinese health administration control the mass infectious diseases that cropped up after devastating floods in 1931.

Dr. Štampar has come to China to help our Government in its work on reconstruction based on the plan of technical cooperation with the League of Nations. He went round several provinces, from Kansu and Shanghai in the West to Kwangtung and Kwangsi in the South, and made a valuable contribution to the reconstruction of our villages, especially in the field of rural health protection services. On his departure, we wish to give this to him as a remembrance of his work in China, hoping he will visit us again.
-- Ching Feng

In 1936, he received an offer from the League of Nations secretary general for the post of an expert at the Health Organization in Geneva. In 1938, he received an invitation from Harvard University in Boston, where he delivered a lecture. After Boston, he toured a great part of North America and lectured on hygiene and social medicine at a series of universities (Yale, Cornell, Johns Hopkins, Cincinnati, Vanderbilt, McHarry, Tulane, Texas, Los Angeles, Berkeley, Portland, Minnesota, Toronto, McGill, Columbia, Galvestone).

The International Health Conference held in New York in the summer of 1946 was attended by the official representatives of 51 nations. With only a few minor alterations, they accepted the World Health Organization (WHO) draft. The First World Health Assembly was called with the ratification of the WHO Constitution. It was in session from 24 June to 24 July 1948. In Geneva, Štampar was elected as the first president of the assembly unanimously. At the 8th regular session of the WHO in Mexico City, in 1955, Štampar was awarded the Leon Bernard Foundation Prize and Medal, the greatest international recognition of merit in the field of social medicine.

A statue has been dedicated to Štampar in Morocco for his work in curing malaria.

== Zagreb ==
Andrija Štampar founded the School of Public Health in Zagreb in 1927.

By the decree of 5 March 1939, eight years after his election as full professor of hygiene and social medicine in Zagreb, he finally became a professor at Zagreb University. Elected by the council of the medical school in Zagreb, Štampar became the school's dean for the academic year 1940/41. With the energy so characteristic of him, he set to work on the reform of medical training.

On the third day of the occupation of Zagreb, Štampar was arrested by the Ustaša police. Released, he was arrested again by the German police and sent to Graz, where he was imprisoned and interned until the arrival of the Soviet Red Army. On his return in May 1945, he resumed his duty as professor of hygiene and social medicine at the medical school and became head of the School of Public Health in Zagreb.

Štampar was the rector of Zagreb University for the academic year 1945/46. In 1952, he was again elected the medical school dean for 5 consecutive years. He also had an important role in founding the medical school at Rijeka in 1955.

Academic offices
Preceded by Stjepan Horvat	Rector of the University of Zagreb; 1945–1946	Succeeded by Grga Novak
Preceded by Tomo Matić	President of the Yugoslav Academy of Sciences and Arts; 1947–1958	Succeeded by Grga Novak
