= Sesvete (disambiguation) =

Sesvete can refer to one of the following:

- Sesvete, a district of the City of Zagreb, Croatia
  - NK Sesvete, a football club in Zagreb, Croatia
- Sesvete, Požega-Slavonia County, a village near Požega, Croatia
- Podravske Sesvete, a village and a municipality in Podravina, Croatia
