= Grga Novak =

Croatian historian (1888–1978)

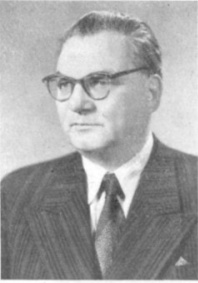
- Born: 2 April 1888; Hvar, Dalmatia, Austria-Hungary (modern Croatia)
- Died: 7 September 1978; Zagreb, SR Croatia, SFR Yugoslavia (modern Croatia)
- Known for: Archaeology, History of Dalmatia
- Scientific career
- Fields: History, archaeology, geography
- Institutions: University of Zagreb, Yugoslav Academy of Sciences and Arts (Note: Later renamed to the Croatian Academy of Sciences and Arts)

Grga Novak (2 April 1888 – 7 September 1978) was a Croatian historian, archaeologist and geographer, and President of the Yugoslav Academy of Sciences and Arts (Note: Later renamed to the Croatian Academy of Sciences and Arts) from 1958 to 1978. Born on the island of Hvar, he was Professor of Ancient History in the University of Zagreb, where he was also Rector between 1946 and 1947. He is best known for pioneering archaeology in Croatia, and his publications on the history of Dalmatia, Split, Dubrovnik, Hvar and the Adriatic Islands.

== Biography ==
Grga Novak studied history, archaeology, and geography in Zagreb, Prague and Vienna, receiving his doctorate in 1913. From 1920, he taught in the Philosophy Faculty in Skoplje (then part of the University of Belgrade), then moved to the University of Zagreb, where he taught ancient history from 1924 to 1959. Dr Novak was a fellow of the Yugoslav Academy of Sciences and Arts in Zagreb from 1939, serving as its President from 1958 to 1978.

== Research and publications ==
Grga Novak was the most important Croatian scholar of his generation in the field of history and archaeology. His area of expertise covered the Ancient World (Greece, Rome, Egypt), in addition to having a deep knowledge of the history of Croatia, especially Dalmatia and the Adriatic Sea and its islands. He wrote extensively, lectured and travelled.

The most important publications of this distinguished Croatian historian were his History of Split (in three volumes), histories of Hvar, Vis, and Dubrovnik, as well as a comprehensive history of Dalmatia in the ancient world. Dr Novak also published five volumes of Governors' reports about Dalmatia, based on material from Venetian archives. His book on the prehistoric sites of Hvar, with the results of his archaeological research form the basis for the further excavation and research of the Adriatic Islands Project.

The Mediterranean Institute Grga Novak on Hvar was established in 1998 by a group of writers and scholars to promote scholarship, art and public activity in Dalmatia. One of the founding members is Slobodan Prosperov Novak, the nephew of Grga Novak.

The Archaeological Collection and Lapidarium of Dr. Grga Novak is displayed in the former Dominican Saint Mark's church in Hvar, as part of the Hvar Heritage Museum. It is the most comprehensive private Neolithic collection of artifacts in the Mediterranean region.

== Works ==
- —— (1932) [1928]. Razvitak moći plovidbe na Jadranu (Our Sea. The Development of Navigation in the Adriatic) (in Croatian) (2nd ed.). Zagreb: Mjesni odbor II. Jadranske straže. p. 356.
- —— (1955). Prethistorijski Hvar. Grapčeva špilja (Prehistoric Hvar Grapčeva cave) (in Croatian). Zagreb: Yugoslav Academy of Sciences and Arts. p. 381.
- —— (1961). Jadransko more u sukobima i borbama kroz stoljeća (Adriatic Sea Conflicts and Battles Through the Centuries) (in Croatian). Belgrade: Vojnoizdavački zavod JNA Vojno Delo. p. 586.
- —— (1961). Vis. Od VI. st prije nove ere do 1941.godine (Vis From 4th Century A.D. to 1941) (in Croatian). Zagreb: Yugoslav Academy of Sciences and Arts. p. 281.
- —— (1964). Mletačka uputstva i izvještaji (English: Venetian Directives and Reports; Latin: Commissiones et relationes venetae) Part IV. From 1572-1590. Monumenta spectantia historiam Slavorum Meridionalium, vol. 47 (in Croatian). Zagreb: Yugoslav Academy of Sciences and Arts. p. 503.
- —— (1966). Mletačka uputstva i izvještaji (English: Venetian Directives and Reports; Latin: Commissiones et relationes venetae) Part V. From 1591-1600. Monumenta spectantia historiam Slavorum Meridionalium, vol. 48 (in Croatian). Zagreb: Yugoslav Academy of Sciences and Arts. p. 364.
- —— (1967). Egipat. Prethistorija-Faraoni-Osvajači-Kultura (Egypt: Prehistory-Pharaohs-Conquerors-Culture) (in Croatian). Zagreb: Yugoslav Academy of Sciences and Arts. p. 285.
- —— (1970). Mletačka uputstva i izvještaji (English: Venetian Directives and Reports; Latin: Commissiones et relationes venetae) Part VI. From 1588-1620. Monumenta spectantia historiam Slavorum Meridionalium, vol. 49 (in Croatian). Zagreb: Yugoslav Academy of Sciences and Arts. p. 345.
- —— (1972) [1924]. Hvar Kroz Stoljeća (Hvar Through the Centuries). Historijski Arhiv - Hvar (Historical Archives of Hvar) (in Croatian). Vol. I (3rd ed.). Narodni Odbor Općine Hvar (National Council of Hvar Municipality).
- —— (1972). Povijest Dubrovnika (History of Dubrovnik) (in Croatian and French) (1 ed.). Zagreb: Historical Institute of the Yugoslav Academy of Sciences and Arts in Dubrovnik. p. 57.
- —— (1972). Mletačka uputstva i izvještaji (English: Venetian Directives and Reports; Latin: Commissiones et relationes venetae) Part VII. From 1621-1671. Monumenta spectantia historiam Slavorum Meridionalium, vol. 50 (in Croatian). Zagreb: Yugoslav Academy of Sciences and Arts. p. 349.
- —— (1977). Mletačka uputstva i izvještaji (English: Venetian Directives and Reports; Latin: Commissiones et relationes venetae) Part VIII. From 1672-1680. Monumenta spectantia historiam Slavorum Meridionalium, vol. 51 (in Croatian). Zagreb: Yugoslav Academy of Sciences and Arts. p. 268.
- —— (1978) [1957]. Povijest Splita (History of Split) (in Croatian). Vol. I. (2nd ed.). Split: Čakavski sabor. p. 695.
- —— (1978) [1961]. Povijest Splita (History of Split) (in Croatian). Vol. II. (2nd ed.). Split: Čakavski sabor. pp. 721–1242.
- —— (1978) [1965]. Povijest Splita (History of Split) (in Croatian). Vol. III. (2nd ed.). Split: Čakavski sabor. pp. 1269–1820.
- —— (2004) [1944]. Slobodan Prosperov Novak (ed.). Prošlost Dalmacije (Ancient Dalmatia) Vol I. Od najstarijih vremena do Kandijskog rata (in Croatian) (3rd ed.). Split: Slobodna Dalmacija i Marjan Tisak.
- —— (2004) [1944]. Slobodan Prosperov Novak (ed.). Prošlost Dalmacije (Ancient Dalmatia) Vol II. Od Kandijskog rata do Rapalskog ugovora (in Croatian) (3rd ed.). Split: Slobodna Dalmacija i Marjan Tisak.

== Notes ==
Academic offices
Preceded by Andrija Štampar	Rector of the University of Zagreb; 1946–1947	Succeeded by Andro Mohorovičić
Preceded by Andrija Štampar	Chairman of the Yugoslav Academy of Sciences and Arts; 1958–1978	Succeeded by Jakov Sirotković
