= Bzenica =

Bzenica can refer to one of the following:

- Bzenica, a village in Požega-Slavonia County, Croatia
- Bzenica, a village in Banská Bystrica Region, Slovakia
