= Srednje Selo =

Srednje Selo may refer to:

- Srednje Selo, Požega-Slavonia County, a village near Pleternica
- Srednje Selo, Split-Dalmatia County, a village on the island of Šolta
- Srednje Selo, Karlovac County, a village near Cetingrad
