= Komorica =

Komorica can refer to one of the following:

- Komorica, a village in Požega-Slavonia County, Croatia
- Komorica, an Adriatic Sea island in Šibenik-Knin County, Croatia
