= Pieter Mulier =

Belgian fashion designer

- Born: 1978 (age 47–48); Ostend, Belgium
- Education: Institut Saint-Luc (MA)
- Occupations: Fashion designer; architect
- Organization: Chief Creative Officer of Versace (beginning July 1, 2026)

Pieter Mulier (born 1978) is a Belgian fashion designer and trained architect. He became the Creative Director of Versace on July 1, 2026. He previously worked as Creative Director of Alaïa from 2021 to 2026 and as Global Creative Director of Calvin Klein. He has been described as the right hand of Raf Simons.

== Biography ==
Mulier was born in 1978 in Ostend, Belgium. He studied architecture at the Institut Saint-Luc, where he earned a Masters of Interior Architecture.

He began his career as an intern at Raf Simons in 2002 and became its head designer by 2003. In this role, he oversaw menswear. He went on to join Simons at Jil Sander, first as a consultant and then as an employee, before following Simons to Dior and then to Calvin Klein, where he served as Global Creative Director. During this time, they took every runway bow side by side. He then took time off from the fashion industry from 2018 to 2021.

Mulier was named Chief Creative Officer of Alaïa in 2021, the first leader after the death of founder Azzedine Alaïa. For his work in this role, he was awarded International Fashion Designer of the Year by the Council of Fashion Designers of America. His final collection for the brand was inspired by his desire for "clothes that cry". The final wedding dress he designed for the brand was for Tamara Kalinic.

He was named Chief Creative Officer of Versace in 2026, which has been described as "unsurprising" due to Simons' role as Co-Creative Director of Versace's parent company Prada. He officially assumed the role on July 1, 2026. His first piece at Versace was for Nicole Kidman.

He has become known for his sculptural designs which combine wearable and experimental stylization. He has also become known for his invitations and show notes: these have included personal WhatsApp texts, letters addressed to Azzedine Alaïa, and folding leather chairs.

He has been described as Simons' right hand and as one of fashion's most wanted designers.

== Personal life ==
Mulier spent sixteen years in a relationship with Matthieu Blazy. The two broke up in 2023.
