= Mihaljevići =

Mihaljevići may refer to:

- Mihaljevići, Bratunac, a village in Bosnia and Herzegovina
- Mihaljevići, Busovača, a village in Bosnia and Herzegovina
- Mihaljevići, Požega-Slavonia County, a village in Croatia
- Mihaljevići, a hamlet of Ceklin, a village in Montenegro
