= Buk, Croatia =

Buk
- Village
- Location within Croatia
- Coordinates: 45°17′15″N 17°51′16″E
- Country: Croatia
- Region: Slavonia
- County: Požega-Slavonia County
- City: Pleternica

Area
  - Total: 7.3 km^{2} (2.8 sq mi)
- Elevation: 168 m (551 ft)

Population (2021)
  - Total: 168
  - Density: 23/km^{2} (60/sq mi)
- Time zone: UTC+1 (CET)
  - Summer (DST): UTC+2 (CEST)
- Postal code: 34310
- Area code: 034

Buk is a village in Požega-Slavonia County, Croatia. The village is administered as a part of the City of Pleternica. According to national census of 2011, population of the village is 192. The village is connected by the D38 state road.
