= Nova Kapela–Batrina railway station =

Railway station in Croatia

Coordinates: 45°11′24″N 17°39′1″E

Nova Kapela–Batrina
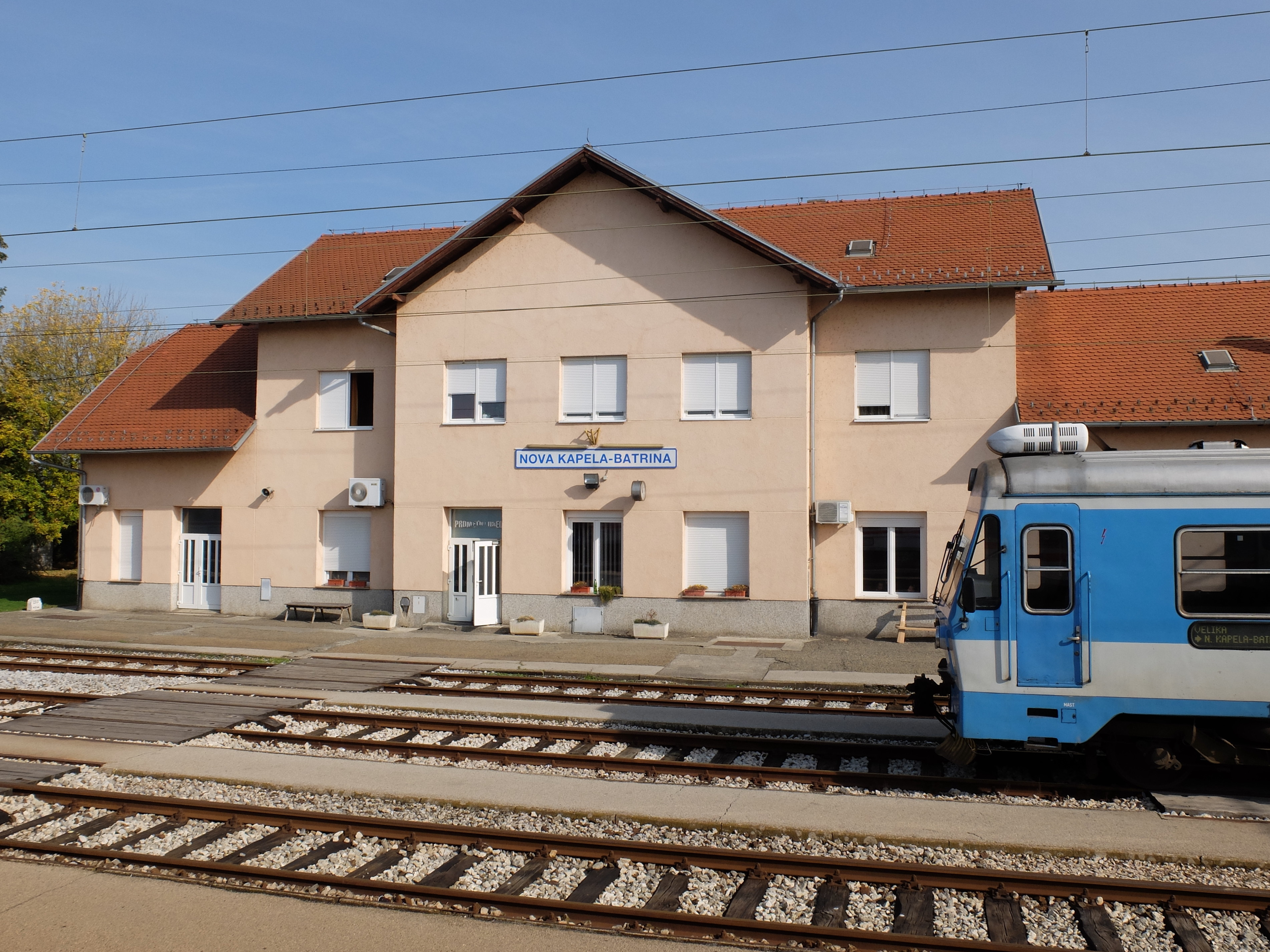

General information
- Location: Croatia
- Tracks: 7
Location

Nova Kapela–Batrina railway station (Croatian: Željeznička stanica Nova Kapela–Batrina) is a railway station on Novska–Tovarnik railway. Located between two settlements, Nova Kapela and Batrina. Railroad continued to Staro Petrovo Selo in one, in the other direction to Oriovac and the third direction towards to Dragovci. Nova Kapela–Batrina railway station consists of 7 railway track.

== See also ==
- Croatian Railways
- Zagreb–Belgrade railway
