= Frkljevci =

- Village
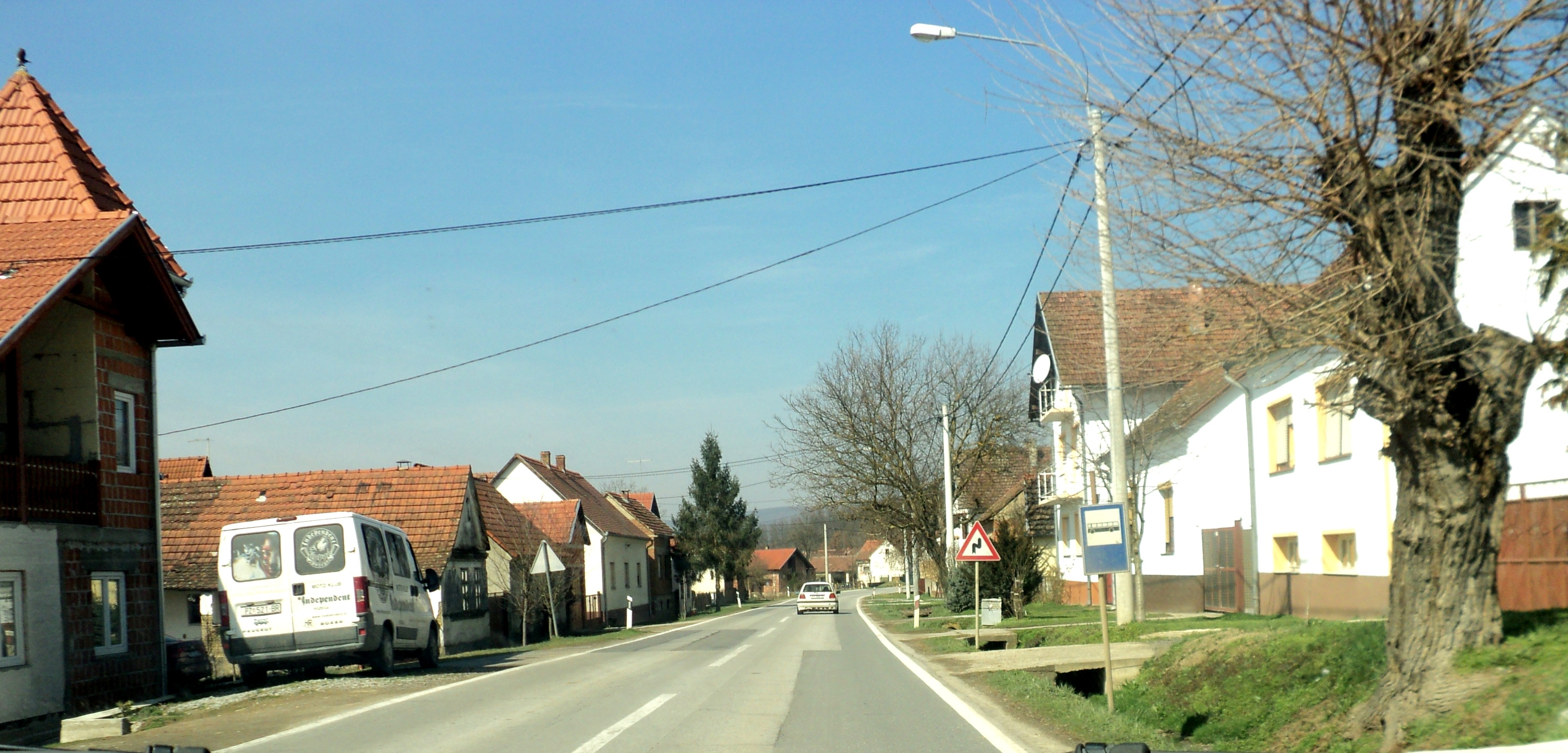
- Frkljevci

- Location within Croatia
- Coordinates: 45°15′43″N 17°49′12″E
- Country: Croatia
- Region: Slavonia
- County: Požega-Slavonia County
- City: Pleternica

Area
  - Total: 6.2 km^{2} (2.4 sq mi)
- Elevation: 121 m (397 ft)

Population (2021)
  - Total: 287
  - Density: 46/km^{2} (120/sq mi)
- Time zone: UTC+1 (CET)
  - Summer (DST): UTC+2 (CEST)
- Postal code: 34310
- Area code: 034

Frkljevci is a village in Požega-Slavonia County, Croatia. The village is administered as a part of the City of Pleternica. According to national census of 2011, population of the village is 345. The village is connected by the D525 state road.
