= Gradac, Požega-Slavonia County =

Gradac
- Village
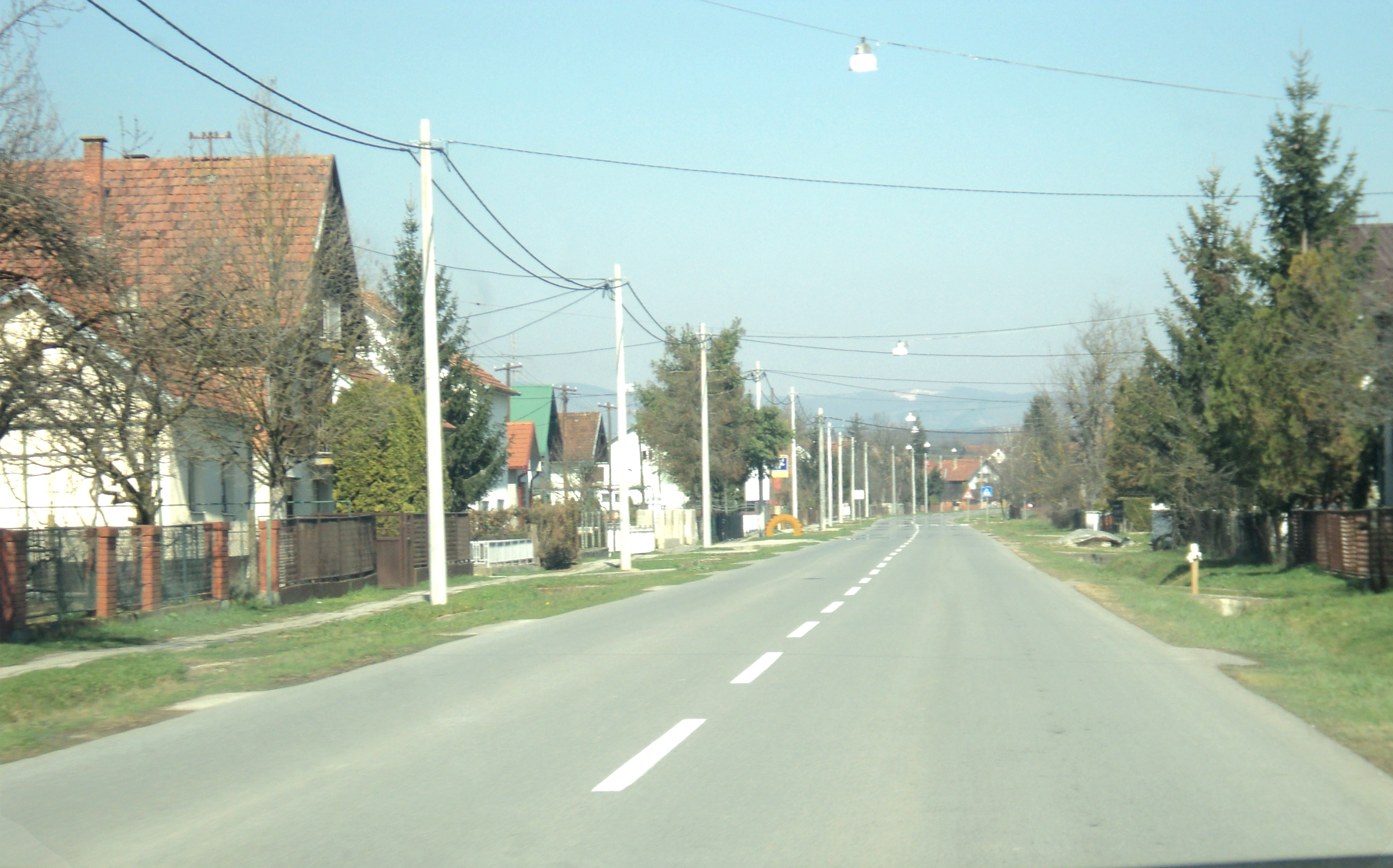
- Gradac

- Location within Croatia
- Coordinates: 45°18′37″N 17°48′34″E
- Country: Croatia
- Region: Slavonia
- County: Požega-Slavonia County
- City: Pleternica

Area
  - Total: 6.4 km^{2} (2.5 sq mi)
- Elevation: 127 m (417 ft)

Population (2021)
  - Total: 789
  - Density: 120/km^{2} (320/sq mi)
- Time zone: UTC+1 (CET)
  - Summer (DST): UTC+2 (CEST)
- Postal code: 34310
- Area code: 034

Gradac is a village in Požega-Slavonia County, Croatia. The village is administered as a part of the City of Pleternica. According to national census of 2001, population of the village is 1,090.
