= Ćosinac =

- Village
- Location within Croatia
- Coordinates: 45°21′06″N 17°50′49″E
- Country: Croatia
- Region: Slavonia
- County: Požega-Slavonia County
- Town: Pleternica

Area
  - Total: 2.2 km^{2} (0.85 sq mi)
- Elevation: 176 m (577 ft)

Population (2021)
  - Total: 39
  - Density: 18/km^{2} (46/sq mi)
- Time zone: UTC+1 (CET)
  - Summer (DST): UTC+2 (CEST)
- Postal code: 34312
- Area code: 034

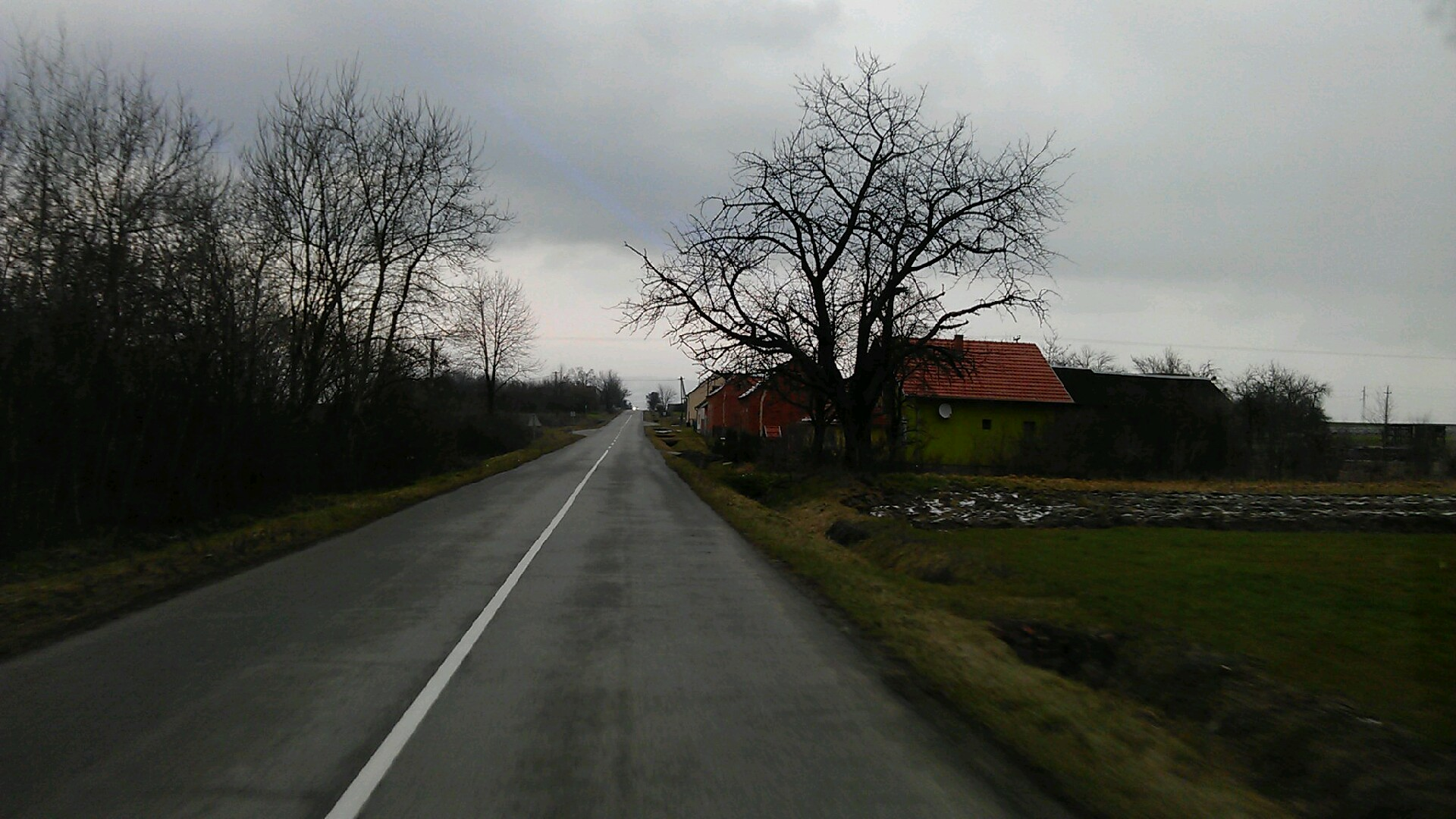
Ćosinac

Ćosinac is a village in Požega-Slavonia County, Croatia. The village is administratively located in the Town of Pleternica. According to national census of 2011, population of the village is 54.
