= Bresnica, Croatia =

Bresnica
- Village
- Location within Croatia
- Coordinates: 45°16′43″N 17°47′08″E
- Country: Croatia
- Region: Slavonia
- County: Požega-Slavonia County
- City: Pleternica

Area
  - Total: 3.2 km^{2} (1.2 sq mi)
- Elevation: 135 m (443 ft)

Population (2021)
  - Total: 175
  - Density: 55/km^{2} (140/sq mi)
- Time zone: UTC+1 (CET)
  - Summer (DST): UTC+2 (CEST)
- Postal code: 34310
- Area code: 034

Bresnica is a village in Požega-Slavonia County, Croatia. The village is administered as a part of the City of Pleternica. According to national census of 2011, population of the village is 218. The village is connected by the D49 state road.
