= Ratkovica =

- Village
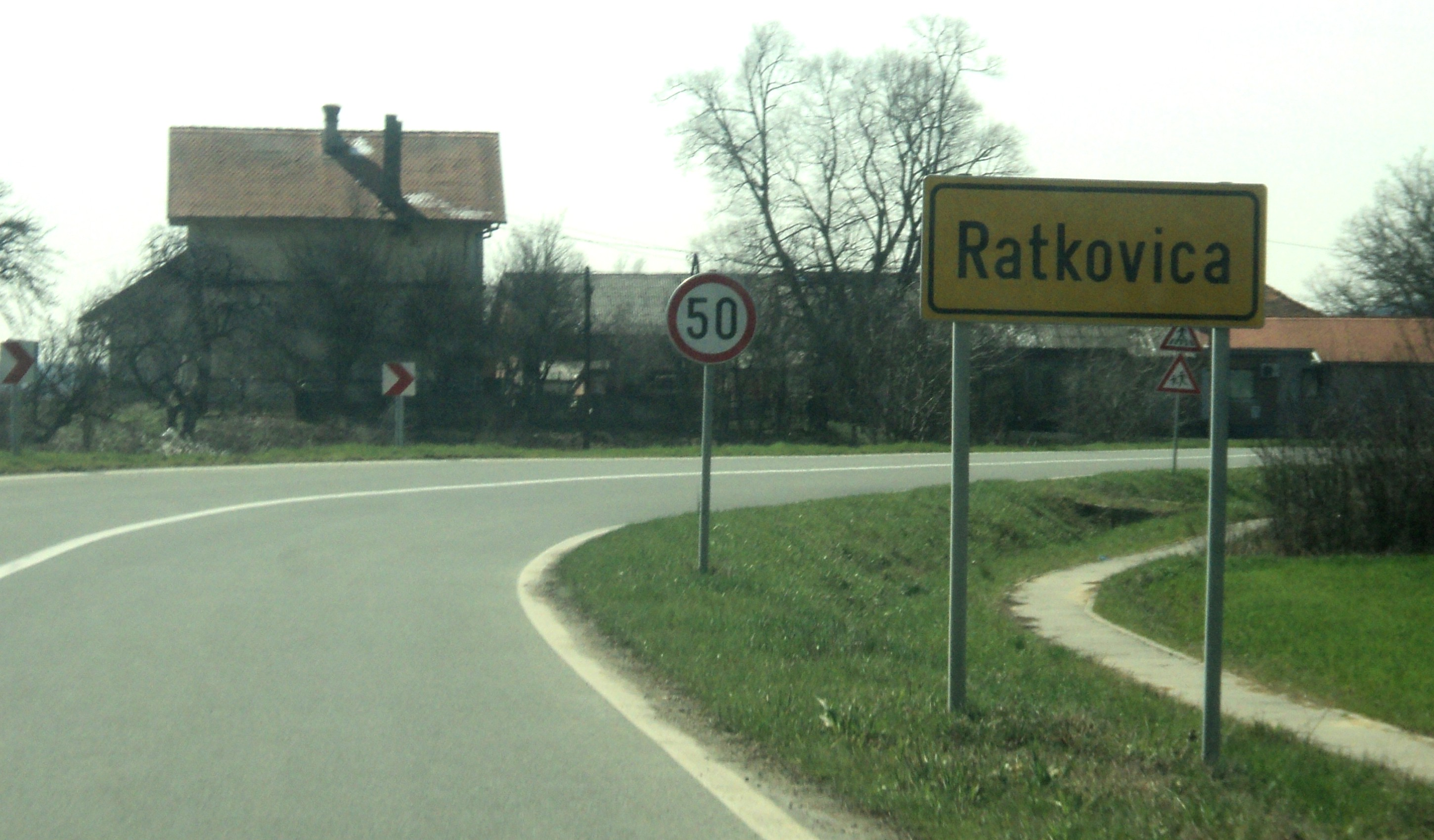
- Ratkovica

- Location within Croatia
- Coordinates: 45°13′45″N 17°43′16″E
- Country: Croatia
- Region: Slavonia
- County: Požega-Slavonia County
- City: Pleternica

Area
  - Total: 4.0 km^{2} (1.5 sq mi)
- Elevation: 118 m (387 ft)

Population (2021)
  - Total: 156
  - Density: 39/km^{2} (100/sq mi)
- Time zone: UTC+1 (CET)
  - Summer (DST): UTC+2 (CEST)
- Postal code: 34310
- Area code: 034

Ratkovica is a village in Požega-Slavonia County, Croatia. The village is administered as a part of the City of Pleternica. According to the national census of 2001, the population of the village is 272. The village is connected by the D49 state road.

Ratkov Potok, Gradpotok or Ratkovica (today). The village name is seen for the first time in documents from the second part of the 13th century in church documents. Initially the village was located 250 meters above today's location on the hill called "kuciste", which is located right below St. Michael Church. Multiple countries have claimed Ratkovica through history. Started with Croatia, Austro-Hungarian Kingdom (biggest part of history), Turkey (switched possession back and forth with Austro-Hungarian Kingdom), Yugoslavia (20th century) and now, in present days, Croatia again. Except for a few old local families, most of the people moved into Ratkovica from other areas of Balkan: Central Bosnia, Serbia, Podravina, Zagorje etc. The village has an elementary school, post office, train station, bus stations and about 100 houses. The most prosperous times in Ratkovica history were in the middle of the 20th century, when Ratkovica mine and paint factory was operating in the village. Now only a few people work in neighboring cities, some in foreign countries and many are on welfare. The 21st-century population boom is caused by the last war (1990–1995) and a big part of the population are refugees from Bosnia.
