= Ašikovci =

- Village
- Location within Croatia
- Coordinates: 45°19′34″N 17°50′05″E
- Country: Croatia
- Region: Slavonia
- County: Požega-Slavonia County
- City: Pleternica

Area
  - Total: 4.2 km^{2} (1.6 sq mi)
- Elevation: 137 m (449 ft)

Population (2021)
  - Total: 67
  - Density: 16/km^{2} (41/sq mi)
- Time zone: UTC+1 (CET)
  - Summer (DST): UTC+2 (CEST)
- Postal code: 34310
- Area code: 034

Ašikovci is a village in Požega-Slavonia County, Croatia. The village is administered as a part of the City of Pleternica. According to national census of 2011, population of the village is 91.
