= Okučani railway station =

Railway station in Croatia

Coordinates: 45°15′9″N 17°12′23″E

Okučani
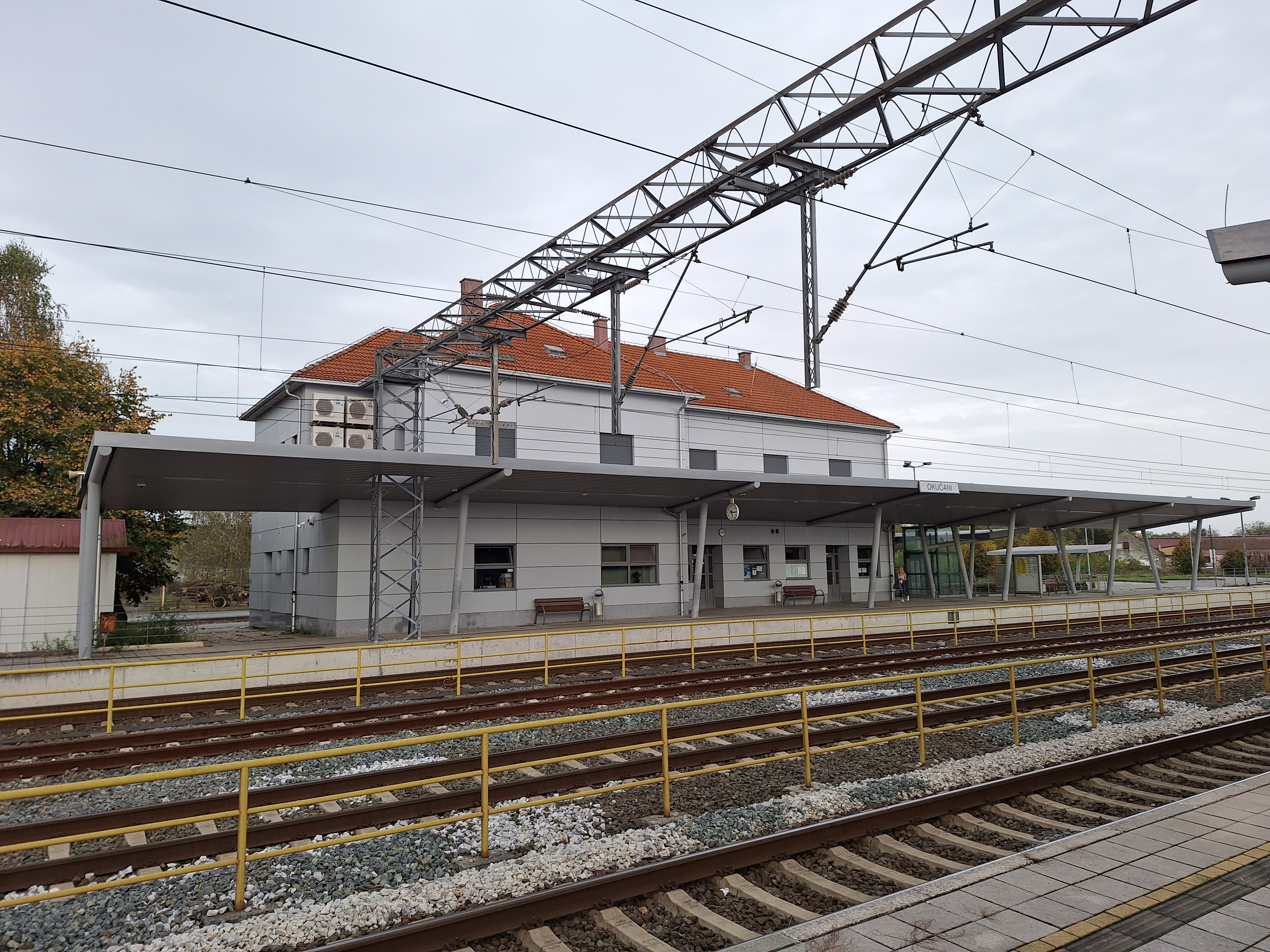

General information
- Location: Croatia
- Tracks: 6
Location

Okučani railway station (Croatian: Željeznička stanica Okučani) is a railway station on Novska–Tovarnik railway in Croatia. Located in Okučani. Railroad continued to Novska in one and the other direction to Nova Gradiška. Okučani railway station consists of 6 railway track.

== See also ==
- Croatian Railways
- Zagreb–Belgrade railway
