= Sulkovci =

- Village
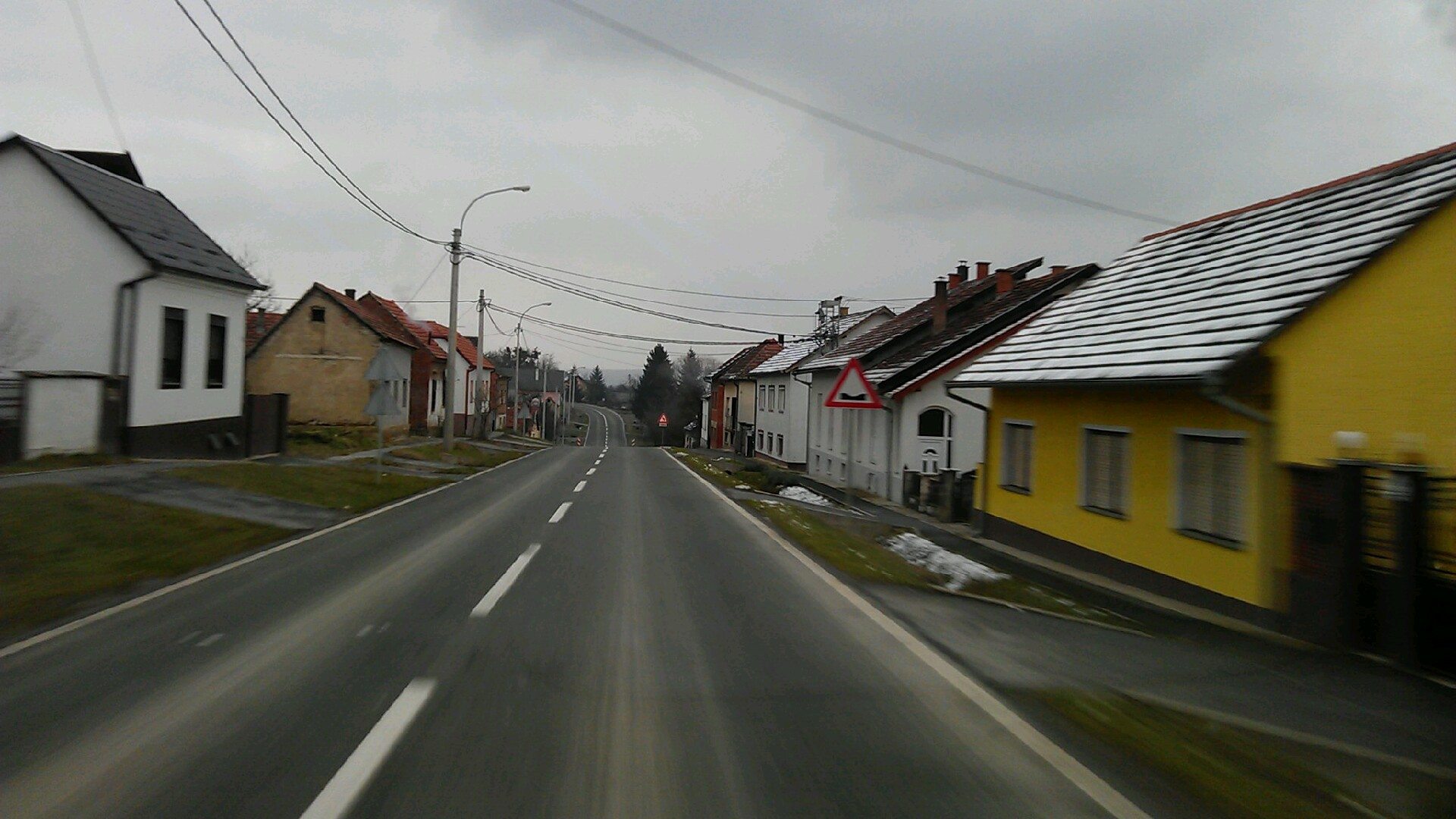
- Sulkovci

- Location within Croatia
- Coordinates: 45°15′59″N 17°46′26″E
- Country: Croatia
- Region: Slavonia
- County: Požega-Slavonia County
- City: Pleternica

Area
  - Total: 11.3 km^{2} (4.4 sq mi)
- Elevation: 129 m (423 ft)

Population (2021)
  - Total: 419
  - Density: 37.1/km^{2} (96.0/sq mi)
- Time zone: UTC+1 (CET)
  - Summer (DST): UTC+2 (CEST)
- Postal code: 34310
- Area code: 034

Sulkovci is a village in Požega-Slavonia County, Croatia. The village is administered as a part of the City of Pleternica. According to national census of 2011, population of the village is 537. The village is connected by the D49 state road.
