= Matthieu Blazy =

French-Belgian fashion designer (born 1984)

- Born: 27 June 1984 (age 42); Paris, France
- Education: École nationale supérieure des arts visuels de La Cambre
- Occupation: Fashion designer
- Years active: 2007–present
- Employer: Chanel

Matthieu Blazy (born 1984) is a French-Belgian designer. He began his fashion career as a menswear designer for Raf Simons, later moving to Maison Martin Margiela, where he worked on the label’s avant-garde artisanal line and women’s ready-to-wear collections.

From 2021 to 2024, he was the creative director of Bottega Veneta. Blazy is the creative director of Chanel since December 2024.

== Early life ==
Blazy was born in Paris to a French father and Belgian mother, and spent his youth between both countries. His father was an art expert and his mother a historian and researcher. He has an older brother who is an airplane pilot and a twin sister who works in Singapore.

During high school, Blazy attended Pangbourne College for a year. He graduated from La Cambre fashion school in Brussels; his graduate collection was about Claudie Haigneré. He did his internships at Balenciaga and John Galliano.

== Career ==
=== Early career ===
Raf Simons was a member of the jury of Blazy's graduate collection, which was inspired by astronaut Claudie Haigneré, and hired him on the spot. Blazy brought bolder geometrical patterns to Simons' collections.

In 2011, Blazy became a designer at Maison Margiela, at a time when the design team was anonymous, and where he experimented with advanced collage techniques. In July 2014, Vogue's Suzy Menkes revealed Blazy after the presentation of Margiela's Artisanal collection he had designed, stating "you can't keep such a talent under wraps." He then designed the Ye encrusted mask worn by Kanye West during the 2013 Yeezus tour.

In November 2014, Blazy joined Phoebe Philo's team as senior designer of Celine working on pre-collections. In August 2016, he was appointed design director of women's ready-to-wear of Calvin Klein under Raf Simons. He left Calvin Klein in 2019.

=== Bottega Veneta ===
In 2020, Blazy became design director of ready-to-wear at Bottega Veneta. In November 2021, he was appointed creative director of Bottega Veneta. Blazy brought an inclusive management style ("egalitarian" according to Anne Collier), shrank the design team, and got the craftspeople involved in the creative process. He introduced the trompe-l'œil denim leather pants (2021), the intrecciato-woven handbags Kalimero (2022) and Andiamo (2023), and the knitted leather sock-slippers (2023). He was dubbed the "Magician of Milan" by Vanessa Friedman. In September 2023, the brand opened its flagship store in Paris on avenue Montaigne, the first designed by Blazy. As part of his duties, he designed the costumes of the Venice Dance Biennale.

In December 2024, Bottega Veneta announced Blazy's departure from the brand.

=== Chanel ===
In December 2024, Blazy was named creative director of Chanel. Following Blazy's appointment and runway debut, Chanel returned to growth in 2025, with sales accelerating to high-single-digit growth during the second half of the year. When his first collection reached stores in March 2026, demand exceeded supply, generating queues and rapid sell-outs in several cities. The resulting retail frenzy was variously dubbed “Blazymania”, “Matthieu-mania” and “Matthieu Mania” by the fashion press.

== Personal life ==
Blazy was in a relationship with fellow fashion designer Pieter Mulier until 2023.
