= Resnik, Požega-Slavonia County =

Resnik
- Village
- Location within Croatia
- Coordinates: 45°17′47″N 17°50′40″E
- Country: Croatia
- Region: Slavonia
- County: Požega-Slavonia County
- City: Pleternica

Area
  - Total: 4.6 km^{2} (1.8 sq mi)
- Elevation: 126 m (413 ft)

Population (2021)
  - Total: 254
  - Density: 55/km^{2} (140/sq mi)
- Time zone: UTC+1 (CET)
  - Summer (DST): UTC+2 (CEST)
- Postal code: 34310
- Area code: 034

Resnik is a village in Požega-Slavonia County, Croatia. The village is administered as a part of the City of Pleternica. According to national census of 2001, population of the village is 301. The village is connected by the D38 state road.
