= Kadanovci =

- Village
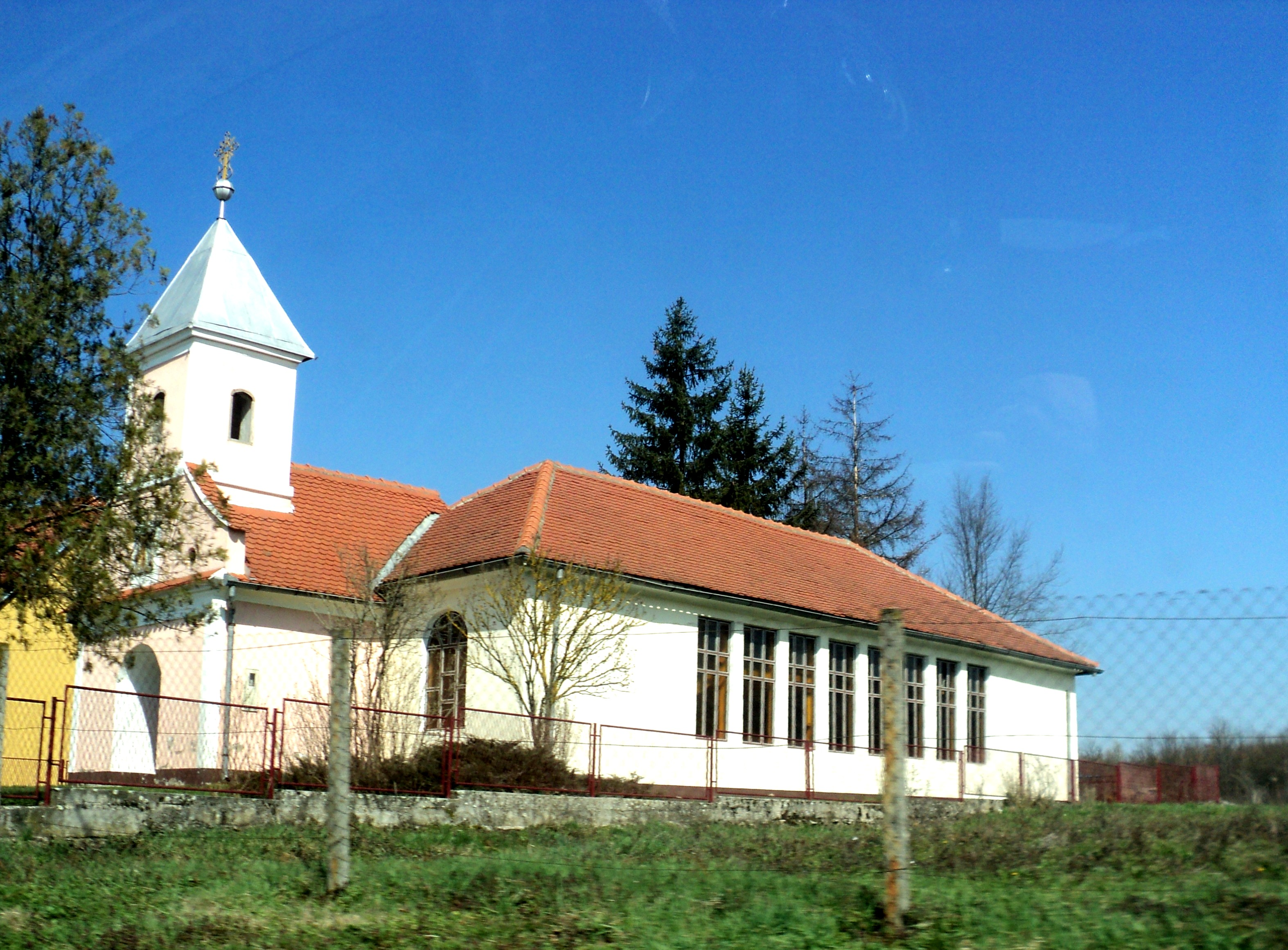

- Location within Croatia
- Coordinates: 45°15′25″N 17°49′48″E
- Country: Croatia
- Region: Slavonia
- County: Požega-Slavonia County
- City: Pleternica

Area
  - Total: 4.9 km^{2} (1.9 sq mi)
- Elevation: 123 m (404 ft)

Population (2021)
  - Total: 197
  - Density: 40/km^{2} (100/sq mi)
- Time zone: UTC+1 (CET)
  - Summer (DST): UTC+2 (CEST)
- Postal code: 34310
- Area code: 034

Kadanovci is a village in Požega-Slavonia County, Croatia. The village is administered as a part of the City of Pleternica. According to national census of 2011, population of the village is 213. The village is connected by the D525 state road.
