= Knežci =

- Village
- Location within Croatia
- Coordinates: 45°20′22″N 17°53′56″E
- Country: Croatia
- Region: Slavonia
- County: Požega-Slavonia County
- City: Pleternica

Area
  - Total: 2.9 km^{2} (1.1 sq mi)
- Elevation: 128 m (420 ft)

Population (2021)
  - Total: 50
  - Density: 17/km^{2} (45/sq mi)
- Time zone: UTC+1 (CET)
  - Summer (DST): UTC+2 (CEST)
- Postal code: 34310
- Area code: 034

Knežci is a village in Požega-Slavonia County, Croatia. The village is administered as a part of the City of Pleternica. According to the national census of 2001, the population of the village is 78.
