= Nova Gradiška railway station =

Railway station in Nova Gradiška, Croatia

Coordinates: 45°15′12″N 17°22′45″E

Nova Gradiška
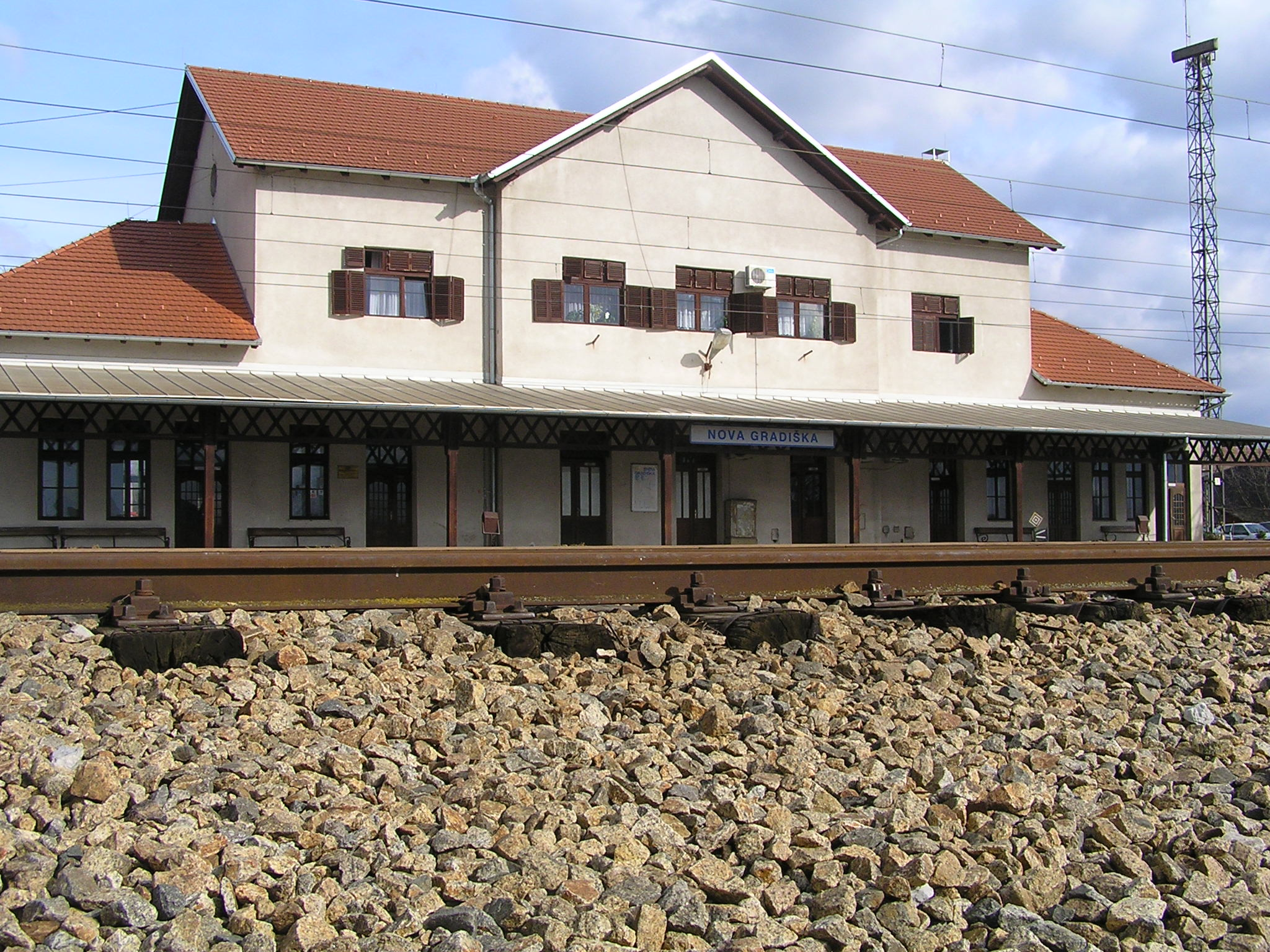

General information
- Location: Croatia
- Tracks: 6
Location

Nova Gradiška railway station (Croatian: Željeznička stanica Nova Gradiška) is a railway station on the Novska–Tovarnik railway in Croatia, located in Nova Gradiška. The railroad continues to Okučani in one direction and to Staro Petrovo Selo in the other. Nova Gradiška railway station consists of six railway tracks.

== See also ==
- Croatian Railways
- Zagreb–Belgrade railway
