= Staro Petrovo Selo railway station =

Railway station in Croatia

Coordinates: 45°13′20″N 17°31′33″E

Staro Petrovo Selo
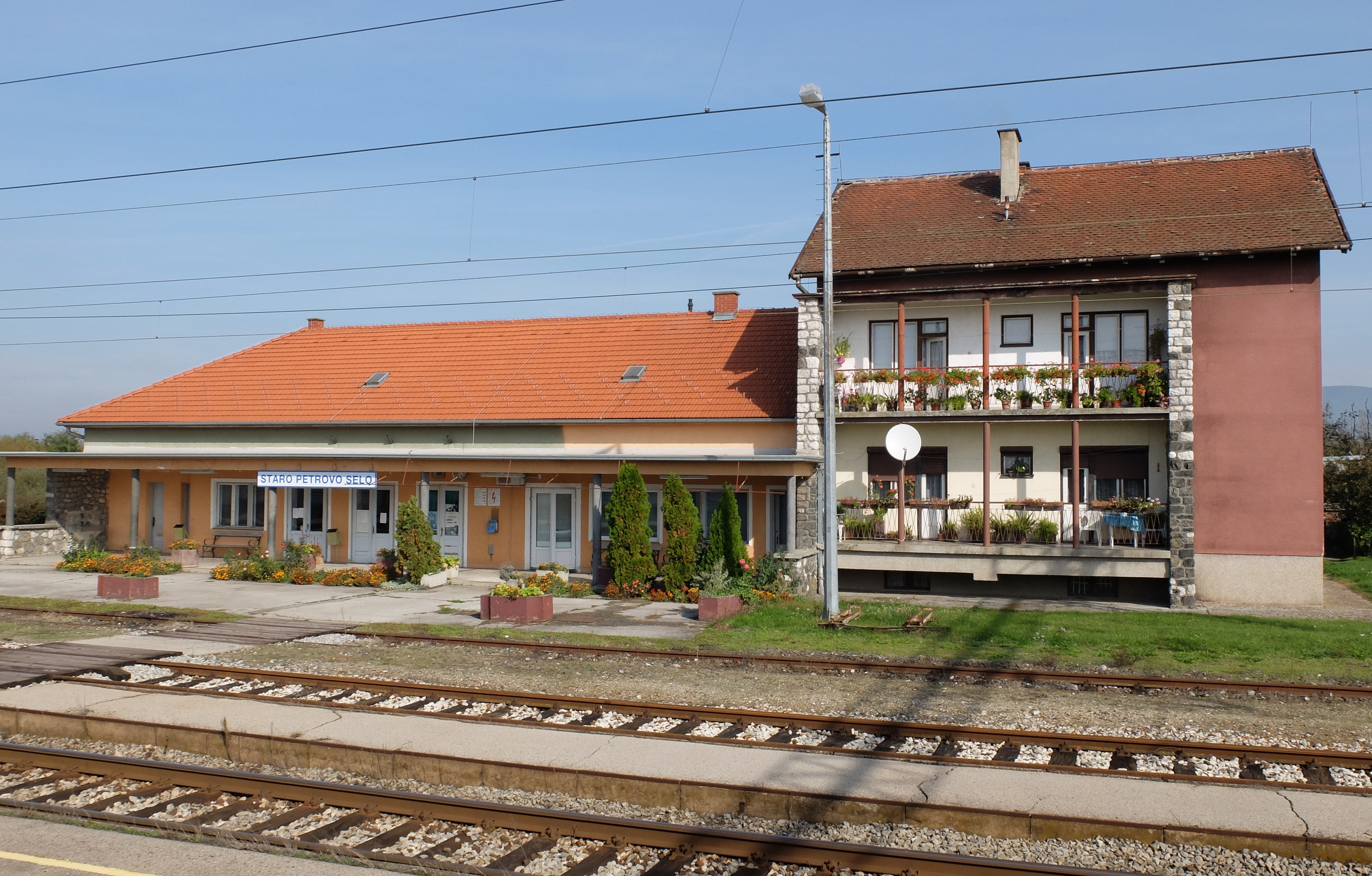

General information
- Location: Croatia
- Tracks: 4
Location

Staro Petrovo Selo railway station (Croatian: Željeznička stanica Staro Petrovo Selo) is a railway station on Novska–Tovarnik railway in Croatia. Located in Staro Petrovo Selo. Railroad continued to Nova Gradiška in one and the other direction to Nova Kapela–Batrina. Staro Petrovo Selo railway station consists of 4 railway track.

== See also ==
- Croatian Railways
- Zagreb–Belgrade railway
