= Nova Kapela, Brod-Posavina County =

Nova Kapela
- Interactive map of Nova Kapela
- Location within Croatia
- Country: Croatia
- County: Brod-Posavina County

Government
  - Mayor: Ivan Šmit (HSS)

Area
  - Total: 128.3 km^{2} (49.5 sq mi)

Population (2021)
  - Total: 3,393
  - Density: 26.45/km^{2} (68.49/sq mi)
- Time zone: UTC+1 (CET)
  - Summer (DST): UTC+2 (CEST)
- Postal code: 35410 Nova Kapela
- Website: novakapela.hr

Nova Kapela is a settlement and a municipality in Brod-Posavina County, Croatia.

== Demographics ==
In 2021, the municipality had 3,393 residents in the following 12 settlements:

- Batrina, population 861
- Bili Brig, population 217
- Donji Lipovac, population 184
- Dragovci, population 264
- Gornji Lipovac, population 59
- Magić Mala, population 327
- Nova Kapela, population 777
- Pavlovci, population 23
- Seoce, population 219
- Siče, population 237
- Srednji Lipovac, population 213
- Stara Kapela, population 12
Nova Kapela: Population trends 1857–2021
v

population	3826	3982	3927	4730	5273	6354	6364	6959	7679	7692	7509	6890	6033	5689	5118	4227	3393
	1857	1869	1880	1890	1900	1910	1921	1931	1948	1953	1961	1971	1981	1991	2001	2011	2021

Sources: Croatian Bureau of Statistics publications

In the 2011 Croatian census, 98.53% of people declared themselves Croats.

== Notable people ==
Nova Kapela is a birthplace of Croatian poet and writer Ivanka Brađašević and actor Emil Glad.

== See also ==
- Nova Kapela–Batrina railway station
