= Vrbova =

Coordinates: 45°12′54″N 17°35′02″E

- Interactive map of Vrbova

Vrbova is a village near Staro Petrovo Selo, Croatia. In the 2011 census, it had 873 inhabitants.
