= Svilna =

- Village
- Location within Croatia
- Coordinates: 45°17′49″N 17°51′15″E
- Country: Croatia
- Region: Slavonia
- County: Požega-Slavonia County
- City: Pleternica

Area
  - Total: 4.2 km^{2} (1.6 sq mi)
- Elevation: 149 m (489 ft)

Population (2021)
  - Total: 109
  - Density: 26/km^{2} (67/sq mi)
- Time zone: UTC+1 (CET)
  - Summer (DST): UTC+2 (CEST)
- Postal code: 34310
- Area code: 034

Svilna is a village in Požega-Slavonia County, Croatia. The village is administered as a part of the City of Pleternica.

According to national census of 2011, population of the village is 139. The village is connected by the D38 state road.
