= Slobodan Prosperov Novak =

Croatian literature historian (born 1951)

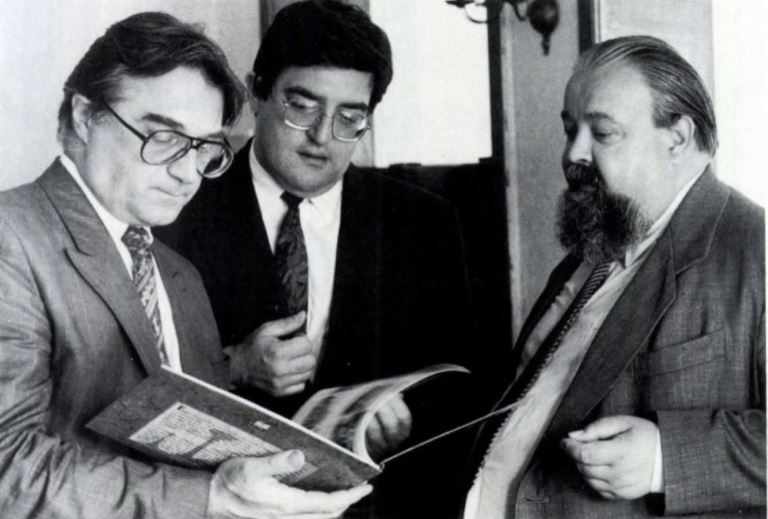
Darko Bekić and Slobodan Prosperov Novak, president of the Croatian PEN Center, with Stojan Vujicic

Slobodan Prosperov Novak (born 11 April 1951), is a Croatian literature historian, comparativist and theatrologist.

== Biography ==
Prosperov Novak was born in Belgrade, but spent his childhood in Dubrovnik. He received his degree in comparative literature in 1973 from the Faculty of Humanities and Social Sciences in Zagreb, his M.A. in 1976 and Ph.D. in 1978. He worked as a journalist in the periodical Vjesnik u srijedu (1973–1974).

In 1977 he became an assistant, and in 1988 a professor of Old Croatian literature at the Faculty of Philosophy. Between 1981 and 1984 he taught at the Institute for Slavic Philology of the University of Rome, and from 1990 to 1992 he served as the assistant minister of education, culture and sport of the Republic of Croatia.

From 1990 to 1992 he was the president of the council of Dubrovnik Summer Festival, and in 2000 served as its head.

He was the initiator and the first editor-in-chief of Matica hrvatska's periodical Vijenac.

He was also the editor of the journal Lettre internationale and the magazine Cicero.

For a number of years he edited the periodical of Croatian writers Most ("The Bridge"). He served as a president of Croatian PEN society from 1990 to 2000, organizing with his collaborators in 1993, in war-affected Dubrovnik, the 59th Word PEN Congress. In 1998 he instituted Mediterranean Institute Grga Novak on the island of Hvar.

From 2001 to 2005 he taught South Slavic philology at the Department for Slavic studies of the Yale University in New Haven, USA. Since 2010, he teaches literature at the Academy of Dramatic Art in Zagreb.

He edited several books on Croatian writers, authored many literary anthologies, and was the creator of multimedial projects, such as the theater shows Ecce homo and Kako bratja prodaše Jozefa at Dubrovnik Summer Festival in 1995.

He worked on a grand exhibition "Gundulićev san" ("Gundulić's dream") in 1989 in the museum space of the city of Zagreb.

== Notable works ==
Some of his notable published works are:

- Dubrovački eseji i zapisi, 1975
- Teatar u Dubrovniku prije Marina Držića, 1977
- Vučistrah i dubrovačka tragikomedija, 1979
- Komparatističke zagonetke, 1979
- Zašto se Euridika osvrnula, 1981
- Planeta Držić, 1984
- Dubrovnik iznova, 1987.
- Kad su đavli voljeli hrvatski, 1988
- Hrvatski pluskvamperfekt, 1991
- Figure straha, 1994
- Povijest hrvatske književnosti (three volumes), 1996, 1997, 1999
- Kratka povijest avanturizma, 2001
- Zlatno doba, 2002
- Povijest hrvatske književnosti 2003

Povijest hrvatske književnosti.I- IV, Zagreb, Slobodna Dalmacija i Marjan tisak, Split, 2004. 

Dubrovnik revisited, Zagreb, MTV, 2004. 47.-49. Volite li Dubrovnik, Zagreb, VBZ, 2005 (Hrvatsko, englesko i francusko izdanje) Tragedije XVI. stoljeća.Zagreb, Matica hrvatska, 2006. Hvar.Mjesta-ljudi-sudbine. Zagreb, Matica hrvatska, 2006. 101 Dalmatinac i poneki Vlaj, Matica hrvatska, 2007. Vježbanje renesanse.Predavanja iz književnosti na Sveučilištu Yale.Algoritam, 2008. Slaveni u renesansi, Matica hrvatska, Zagreb, 2009.

Leksikon Marina Držića., I-II. Slobodan Prosperov Novak et alia, Leksikografski zavod Miroslav Krleža, Zagreb, 2009. 
Pričaj mi o Europi, Naklada Ljevak, Zagreb 2009.
101 Dalmatinka, Projekt Polis, Split, 2010.

Zločesti tekstovi, Profil, Zagreb, 2010. Boka Kotorska od kampanela do kampanela, AGM, Zagreb,2011. Knjiga o teatru, AGM, Zagreb,2014. Književnost ranog novovjekovlja u Boki kotorskoj.S Viktorijom Franić Tomić, Hrvatska sveučilišna naklada, Zagreb,2014. Abrahamova žrtva.S Viktorijom Franić Tomić.Matica hrvatska, Zagreb,2015. Split.Monografija. S Ivom Pervanom.Lilliput Planet, Zagreb,2015. Marin Držić, Izabrana djela, I-II, Stoljeća hrvatske književnosti, Zagreb,2011-2015.

Zlatna knjiga bokeljskih književnika.S Viktorijom Franić Tomić, Lilliput Planet, Zagreb,2016.
Vruja.Grad vode i vjetra. Splićanka d.o.o., Split,2016. (+ prijevod na engleski jezik i ruski jezik)

Pisac i vlast.Poetika Marina Držića, Školska knjiga, Zagreb,2017.

Povijest hrvatske književnosti.I- IV, Zagreb, Slobodna Dalmacija i Marjan tisak, Split, 2004.
