= Srednje Selo, Požega-Slavonia County =

Srednje Selo
- Village
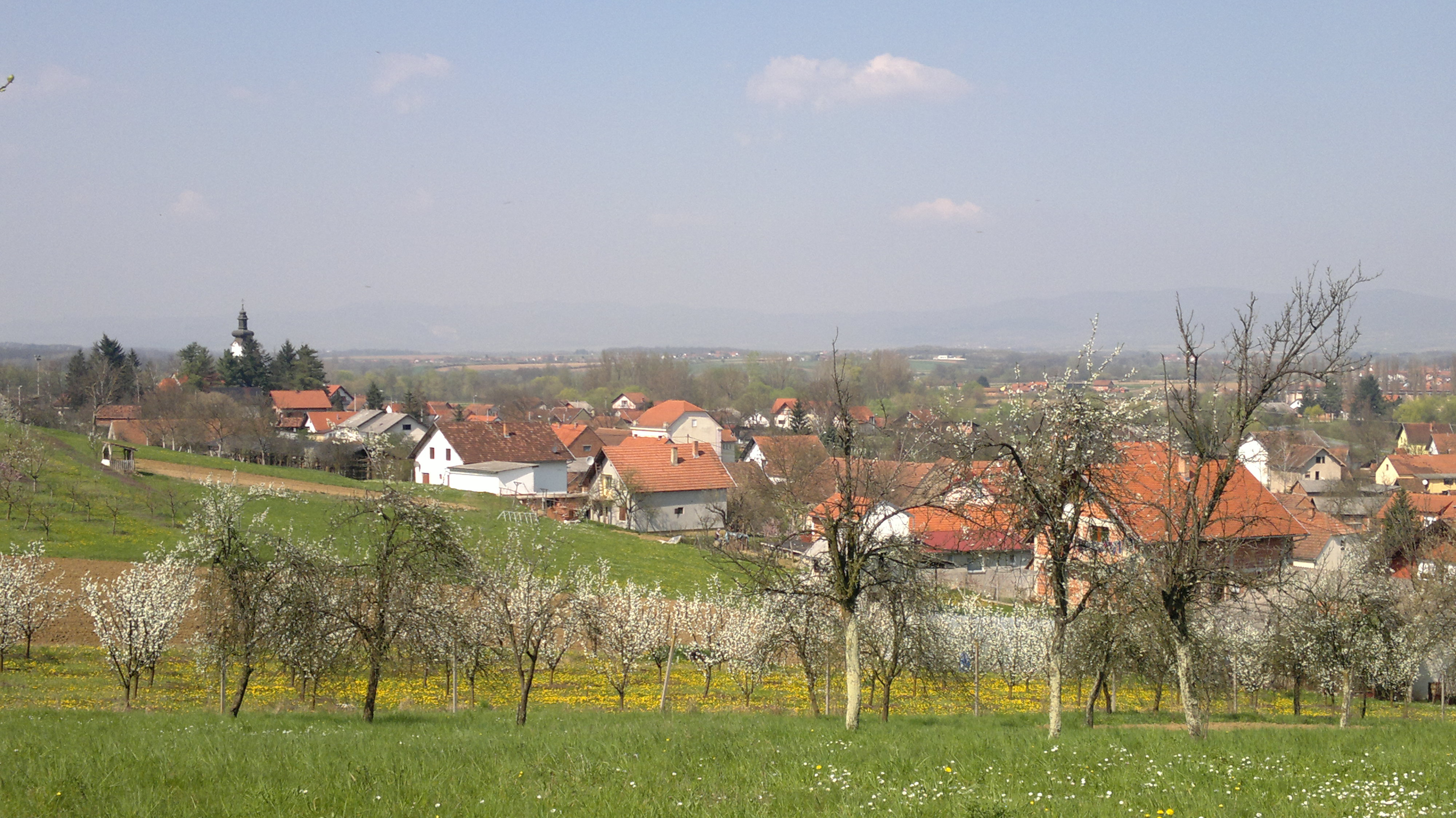

- Location within Croatia
- Coordinates: 45°19′31″N 17°45′42″E
- Country: Croatia
- Region: Slavonia
- County: Požega-Slavonia County
- City: Pleternica

Area
  - Total: 2.0 km^{2} (0.77 sq mi)
- Elevation: 129 m (423 ft)

Population (2021)
  - Total: 253
  - Density: 130/km^{2} (330/sq mi)
- Time zone: UTC+1 (CET)
  - Summer (DST): UTC+2 (CEST)
- Postal code: 34310
- Area code: 034

Srednje Selo is a village in Požega-Slavonia County, Croatia. The village is administered as a part of the City of Pleternica. According to national census of 2011, population of the village is 285. The village is connected by the D38 state road.
