= Sesvete, Požega-Slavonia County =

Sesvete
- Village
- Location within Croatia
- Coordinates: 45°20′23″N 17°50′00″E
- Country: Croatia
- Region: Slavonia
- County: Požega-Slavonia County
- City: Pleternica

Area
  - Total: 4.2 km^{2} (1.6 sq mi)
- Elevation: 173 m (568 ft)

Population (2021)
  - Total: 107
  - Density: 25/km^{2} (66/sq mi)
- Time zone: UTC+1 (CET)
  - Summer (DST): UTC+2 (CEST)
- Postal code: 34312
- Area code: 034

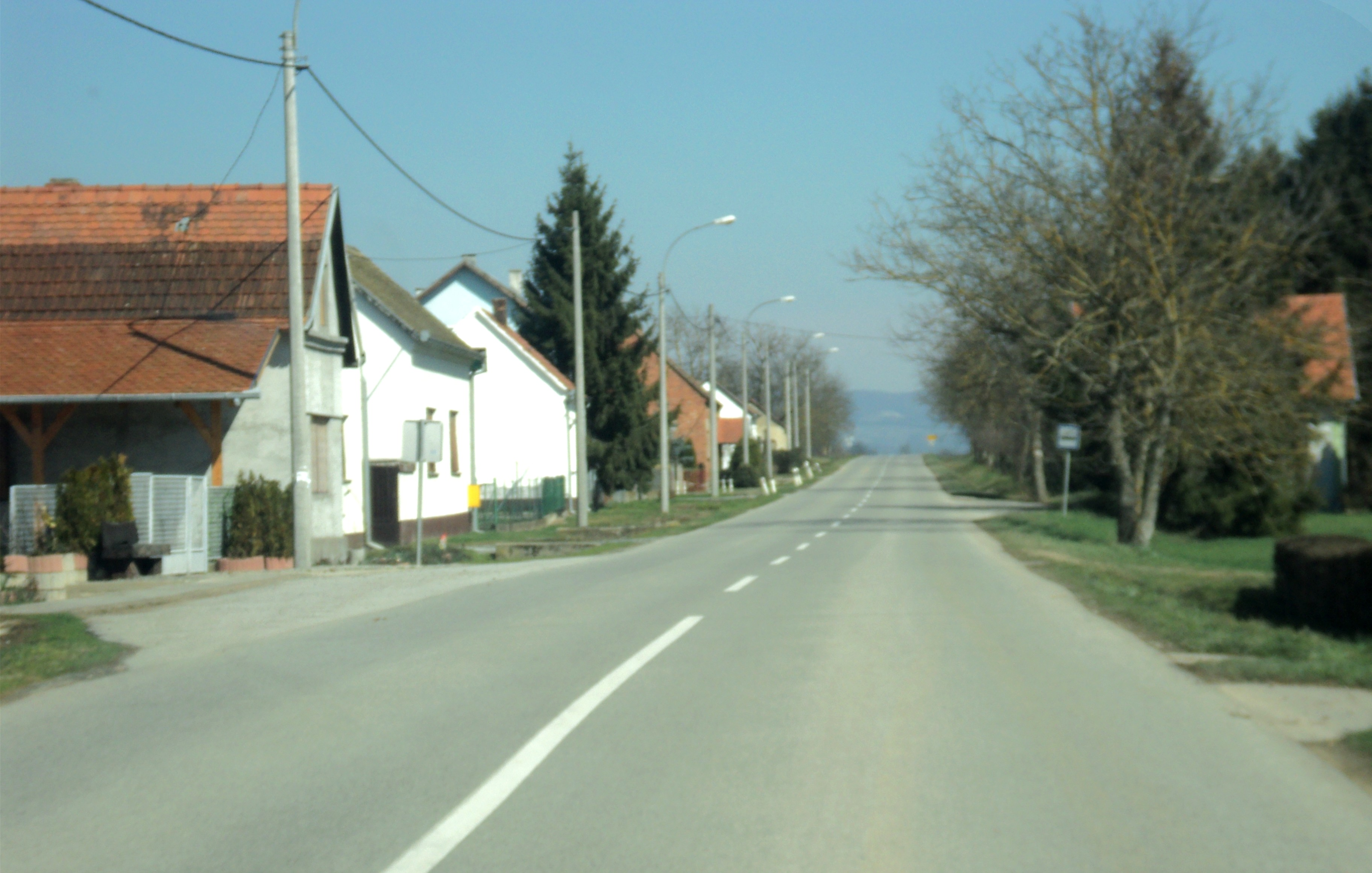

Sesvete is a village in Požega-Slavonia County, Croatia. The village is administered as a part of the City of Pleternica. According to national census of 2021, population of the village is 107.
