= Komorica, Požega-Slavonia County =

Komorica
- Village
- Location within Croatia
- Coordinates: 45°14′23″N 17°43′26″E
- Country: Croatia
- Region: Slavonia
- County: Požega-Slavonia County
- City: Pleternica

Area
  - Total: 6.0 km^{2} (2.3 sq mi)
- Elevation: 122 m (400 ft)

Population (2021)
  - Total: 116
  - Density: 19/km^{2} (50/sq mi)
- Time zone: UTC+1 (CET)
  - Summer (DST): UTC+2 (CEST)
- Postal code: 34310
- Area code: 034

Komorica is a village in Požega-Slavonia County, Croatia. The village is administered as a part of the City of Pleternica. According to national census of 2001, population of the village is 213.
