= Mihaljevići, Požega-Slavonia County =

Mihaljevići
- Village
- Location within Croatia
- Coordinates: 45°15′51″N 17°52′33″E
- Country: Croatia
- Region: Slavonia
- County: Požega-Slavonia County
- City: Pleternica

Area
  - Total: 1.5 km^{2} (0.58 sq mi)
- Elevation: 219 m (719 ft)

Population (2021)
  - Total: 0
  - Density: 0.0/km^{2} (0.0/sq mi)
- Time zone: UTC+1 (CET)
  - Summer (DST): UTC+2 (CEST)
- Postal code: 34310
- Area code: 034

Mihaljevići is a village in Požega-Slavonia County, Croatia. The village is administered as a part of the City of Pleternica.

According to national census of 2011, population of the village is 2.
