= Kalinić, Croatia =

Kalinić
- Village
- Location within Croatia
- Coordinates: 45°18′20″N 17°52′57″E
- Country: Croatia
- Region: Slavonia
- County: Požega-Slavonia County
- City: Pleternica

Area
  - Total: 3.6 km^{2} (1.4 sq mi)
- Elevation: 187 m (614 ft)

Population (2021)
  - Total: 62
  - Density: 17/km^{2} (45/sq mi)
- Time zone: UTC+1 (CET)
  - Summer (DST): UTC+2 (CEST)
- Postal code: 34310
- Area code: 034

Kalinić is a village in Požega-Slavonia County, Croatia. The village is administered as a part of the City of Pleternica. According to national census of 2011, population of the village is 59. The village is connected by the D38 state road.
