= Monumenta Slavorum =

South Slavic historical text collection

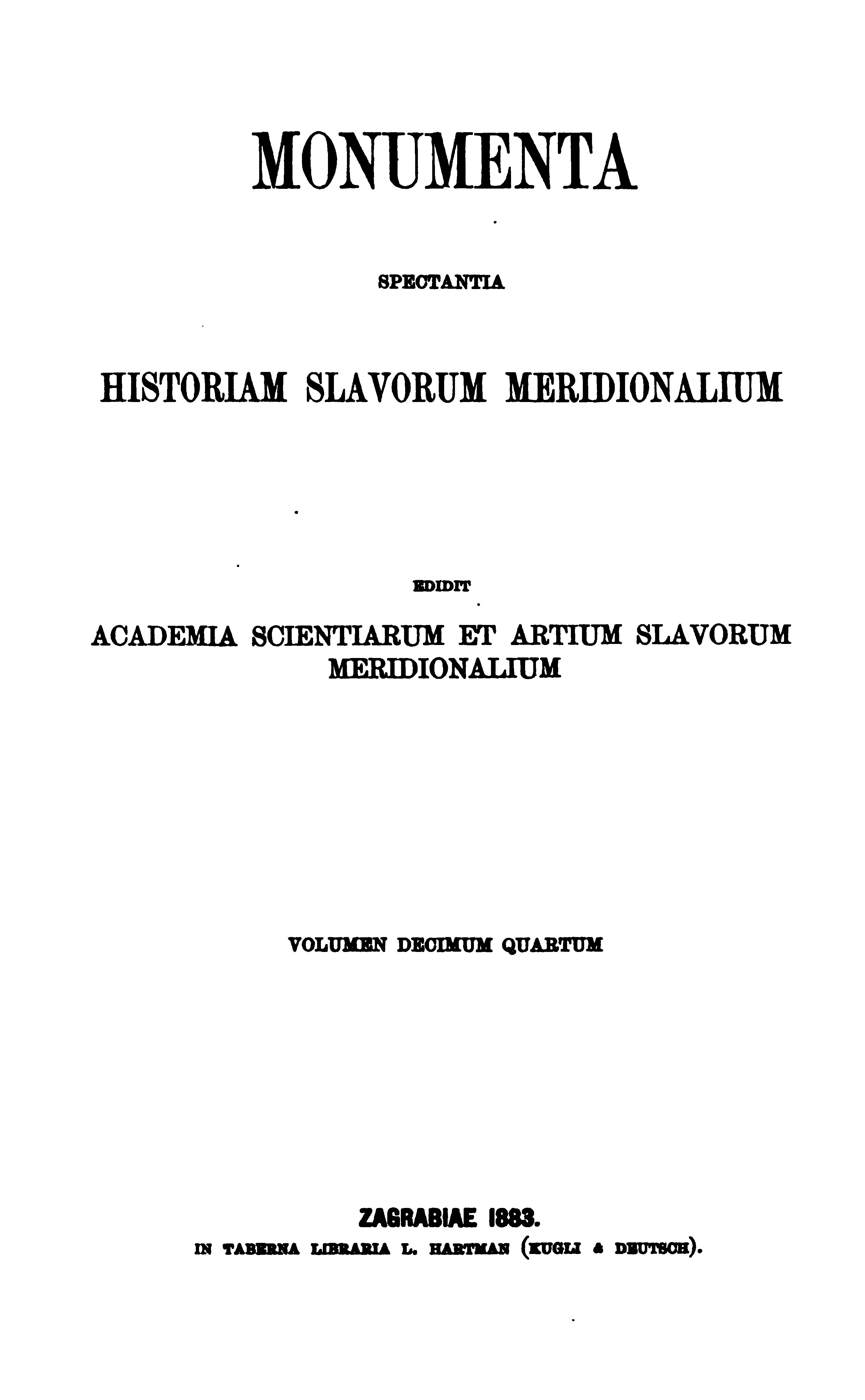
Volume 14 of the Monumenta spectantia historiam Slavorum meridionalium, 1868.

Monumenta Slavorum (Latin for Monuments of Slavs) were two series of primary sources for the history of South Slavs, published by the Yugoslav Academy of Sciences and Arts:

- Monumenta spectantia historiam Slavorum Meridionalium (MSHSM, "Monuments pertaining to history of the South Slavs")
- Monumenta historico-juridica Slavorum Meridionalium (MHJSM, "Historical and legal monuments of the South Slavs")

Although they were originally envisaged as a collection of sources for the Medieval history of the South Slavs, they were subsequently expanded to cover later centuries as well. The inspiration for their publication had been the Monumenta Historica Germaniae, and encouragement for publishing of the series was given by Ivan Kukuljević Sakcinski and his collection of sources known as Iura regni Croatiae, Dalmatiae et Slavoniae ("Rights of the kingdom of Croatia, Dalmatia and Slavonia", 1861-1862).

== MSHSM ==
After the founding of the Yugoslav Academy of Sciences and Arts in 1866, the institution under the chairmanship of Franjo Rački took up the task of publishing historical sources, which would serve as primary sources for the historical interpretation of the Croatian statehood. Publishing of the monuments commenced the following year, primarily of those that confirm the Croatian state law, in the series Monumenta spectantia historiam Slavorum Meridionalium. The laws of egdotics were used in publishing the sources, in accordance with the principles of contemporary European historiography. In the MSHSM series several sets of sources collected into thematic and temporal units by renowned experts such as:

- Šime Ljubić: Listine o odnošajih između južnoga Slavenstva i mletačke republike, I–X, 1868–91
- Franjo Rački:Documenta historiae Chroaticae periodum antiquam illustrantia 1877
- Radoslav Lopašić: Spomenici hrvatske Krajine, I–III, 1884–89
- Ferdo Šišić: Acta comitialia regni Croatiae, Dalmatiae et Slavoniae, I–V, 1912–18
- Emilij Laszowski: Monumenta Habsburgica Regni Croatiae, Dalmatiae, Slavoniae, I–III, 1914–1917
- Vjekoslav Klaić: Acta Keglevichiana annorum 1322–1527, 1917

The particularly fertile period was until 1918, when 43 volumes were printed. After long delays, and only periodic publishing, the Croatian Academy of Sciences and Arts has revived the issuance of MSHSM after 1990, and the last volume was published in 2002. 53 volumes were published in total.

== MHJSM ==
Monumenta historico-juridica Slavorum Meridionalium commenced publishing in 1877 with a series Statuta et leges. The series was intended to cover a variety of sources of legal significance (primarily codes, statutes and terriers), and the rationale for the methods of their publication was given by Baldo Bogišić in the book Pisani zakoni na slavenskom jugu (1872). Other editors of the series were:

- Radoslav Lopašić: Urbaria lingua Croatica conscripta, 1894
- Konstantin Vojnović: Bratovštine i obrtne korporacije u Republici Dubrovačkoj, I–II, 1899–1900
- Ivan Strohal: Statut i reformacije grada Trogira, 1915

Šime Ljubić and other renowned historians. In this series sources collected by Ivan Kukuljević Sakcinski and Radslav Lopašić were printed. Only 13 volumes were published in the series, the last one in 1979.

Although some of the monuments (documents, statutes) have experienced modern editions in the past two decades, both of the series contain valuable and indispensable sources for the study of Croatian and South Slavic history.
