= Batrina =

- Village
- Location within Croatia
- Coordinates: 45.187754°N 17.662024°E
- Country: Croatia
- Region: Slavonia
- County: Brod-Posavina County
- Municipality: Nova Kapela

Area
  - Total: 9.7 km^{2} (3.7 sq mi)
- Elevation: 104 m (341 ft)

Population (2021)
  - Total: 861
  - Density: 89/km^{2} (230/sq mi)
- Time zone: UTC+1 (CET)
  - Summer (DST): UTC+2 (CEST)
- Postal code: 35410
- Area code: 035

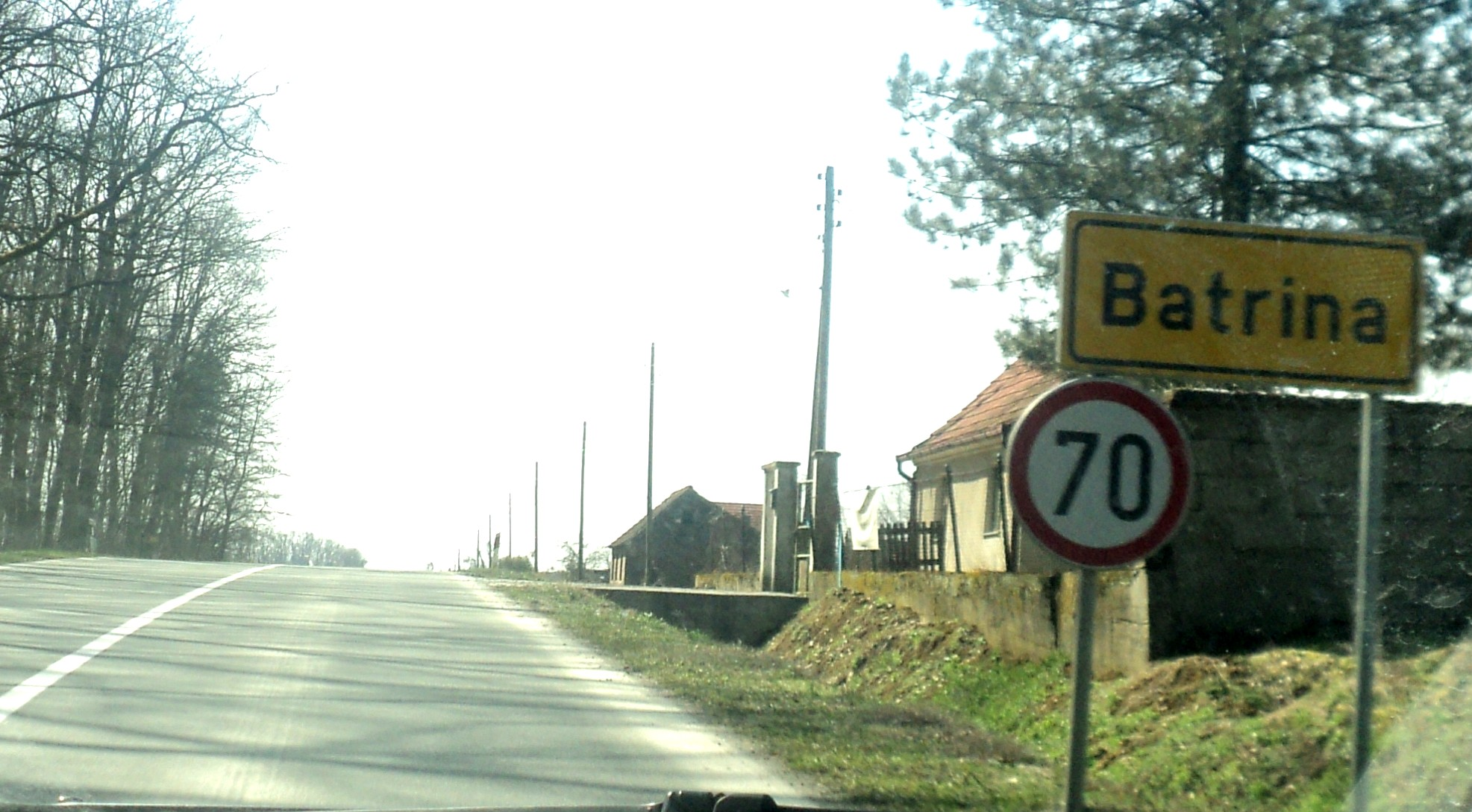
A road in Batrina.

Batrina is a village in Slavonia region of Croatia. The settlement is administered as a part of Nova Kapela municipality, Brod-Posavina County. According to the 2001 census, the village has 1005 inhabitants. It is connected by the D49 state road.

== See also ==
- Nova Kapela–Batrina railway station
