= Bilice, Požega-Slavonia County =

Bilice
- Village
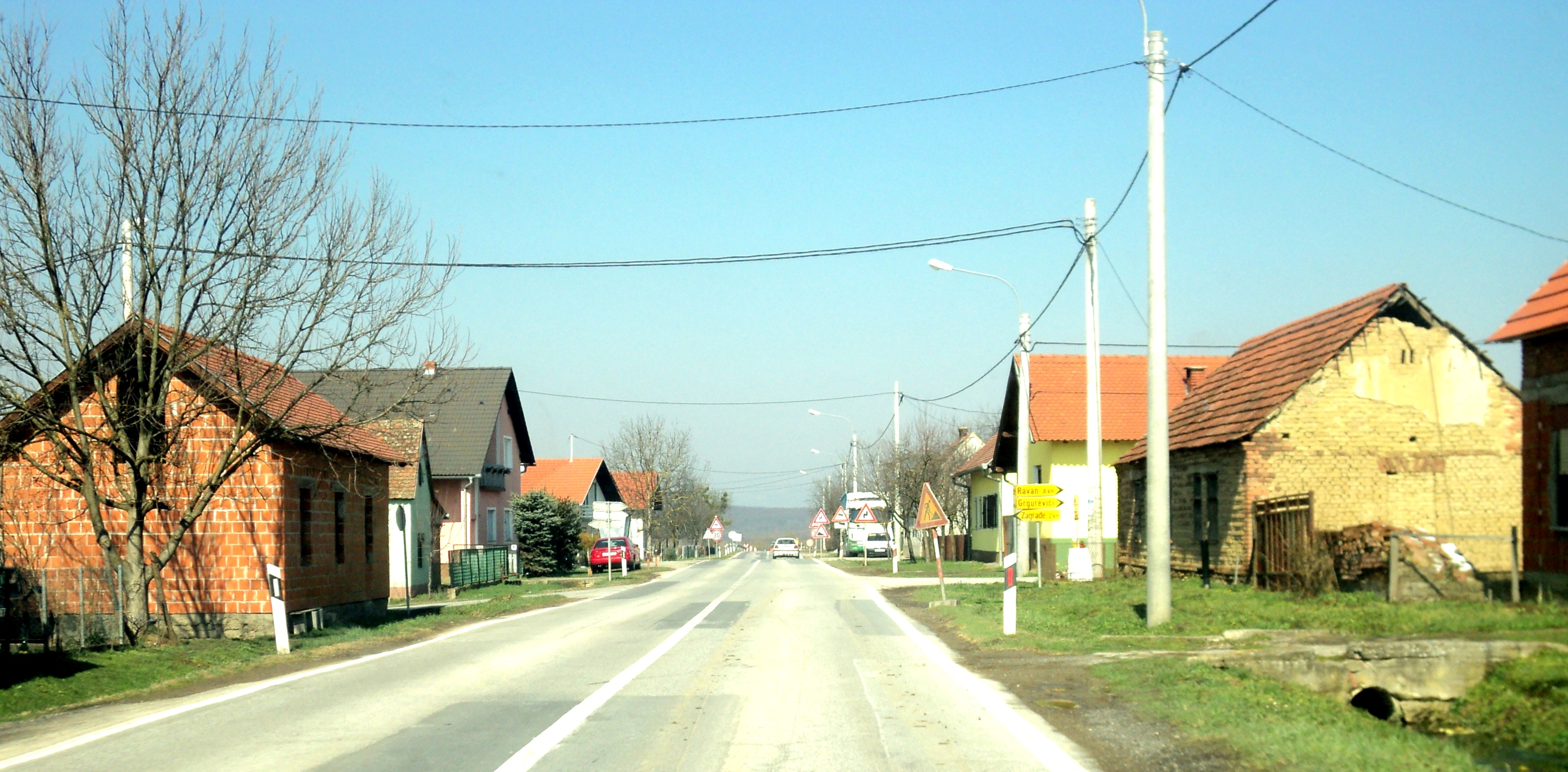

- Location within Croatia
- Coordinates: 45°14′24″N 17°50′32″E
- Country: Croatia
- Region: Slavonia
- County: Požega-Slavonia County
- City: Pleternica

Area
  - Total: 4.5 km^{2} (1.7 sq mi)
- Elevation: 138 m (453 ft)

Population (2021)
  - Total: 150
  - Density: 33/km^{2} (86/sq mi)
- Time zone: UTC+1 (CET)
  - Summer (DST): UTC+2 (CEST)
- Postal code: 34310
- Area code: 034

Bilice is a village in Požega-Slavonia County, Croatia. The village is administered as a part of the City of Pleternica. According to national census of 2011, population of the village is 188. The village is connected by the D525 state road.
