= Staro Petrovo Selo =

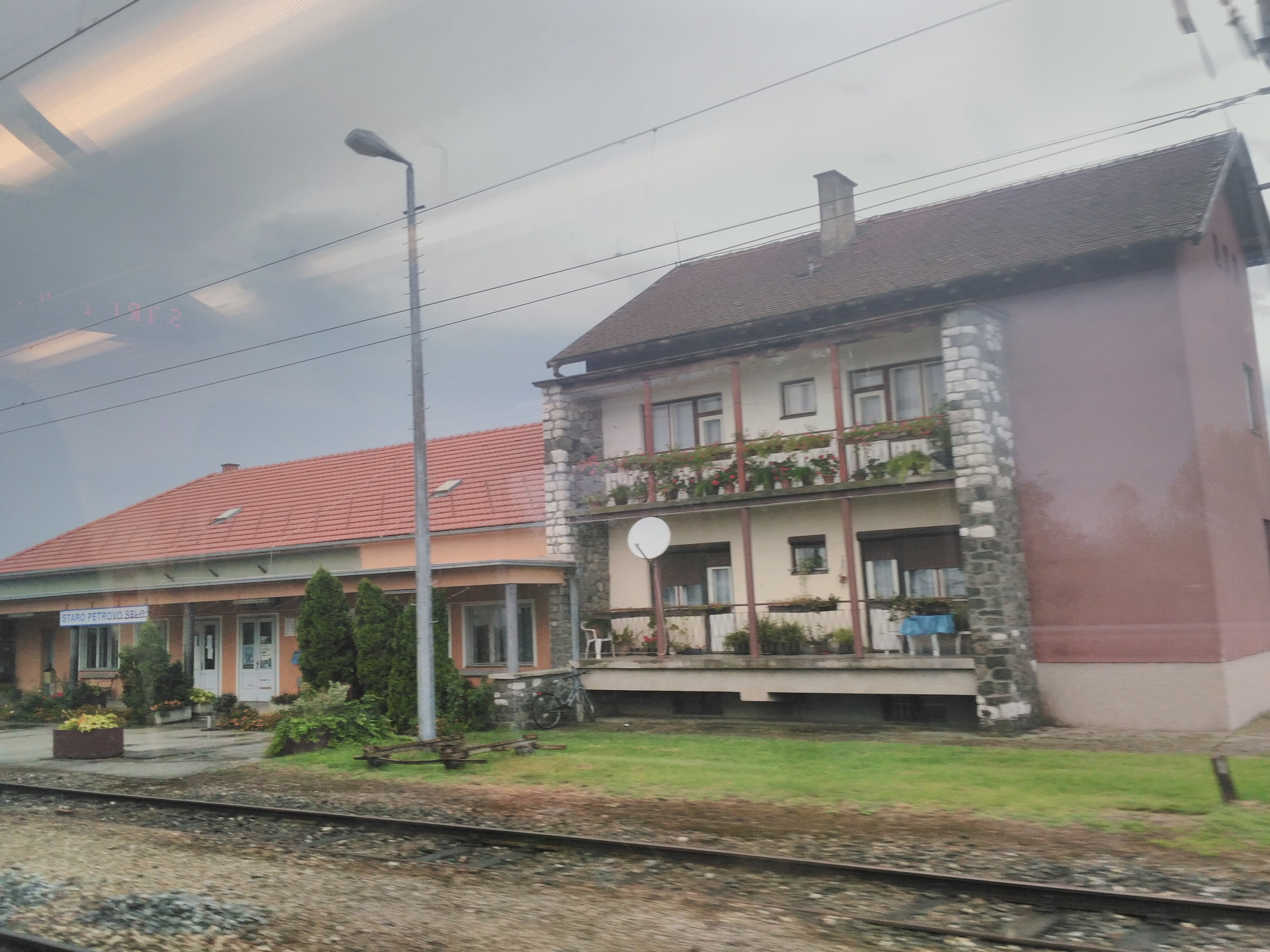
- Interactive map of Staro Petrovo Selo
- Location within Croatia
- Coordinates: 45°14′N 17°31′E
- Country: Croatia
- County: Brod-Posavina County

Government
  - Mayor: Nikola Denis (HDZ)

Area
  - City: 141.0 km^{2} (54.4 sq mi)
  - Urban: 29.8 km^{2} (11.5 sq mi)

Population (2021)
  - City: 4,110
  - Density: 29.1/km^{2} (75.5/sq mi)
  - Urban: 1,277
  - Urban density: 42.9/km^{2} (111/sq mi)
- Postal code: 35420 Staro Petrovo Selo
- Website: staropetrovoselo.hr

Staro Petrovo Selo is a village and a municipality in Brod-Posavina County, Croatia. It is located between Nova Gradiška and Slavonski Brod, between the southern slopes of the Požeška gora mountain and the Sava river plain in the region of Slavonia, 12 km (7.5 mi) southeast of Nova Gradiška, at an elevation of 91 m.

== Demographics ==
In 2021, the municipality had 4,110 residents in the following 13 settlements:

- Blažević Dol, population 101
- Donji Crnogovci, population 106
- Godinjak, population 566
- Gornji Crnogovci, population 69
- Komarnica, population 175
- Laze, population 259
- Oštri Vrh, population 135
- Starci, population 7
- Staro Petrovo Selo, population 1,277
- Štivica, population 421
- Tisovac, population 301
- Vladisovo, population 7
- Vrbova, population 686
Staro Petrovo Selo: Population trends 1857–2021
v

population	4041	4092	4050	5464	5951	7360	7386	8232	8946	9095	8947	8260	7384	7175	6352	5186	4110
	1857	1869	1880	1890	1900	1910	1921	1931	1948	1953	1961	1971	1981	1991	2001	2011	2021

Sources: Croatian Bureau of Statistics publications

== See also ==
- Staro Petrovo Selo railway station
