= Tamara Kalinic =

Serbian model and fashion blogger

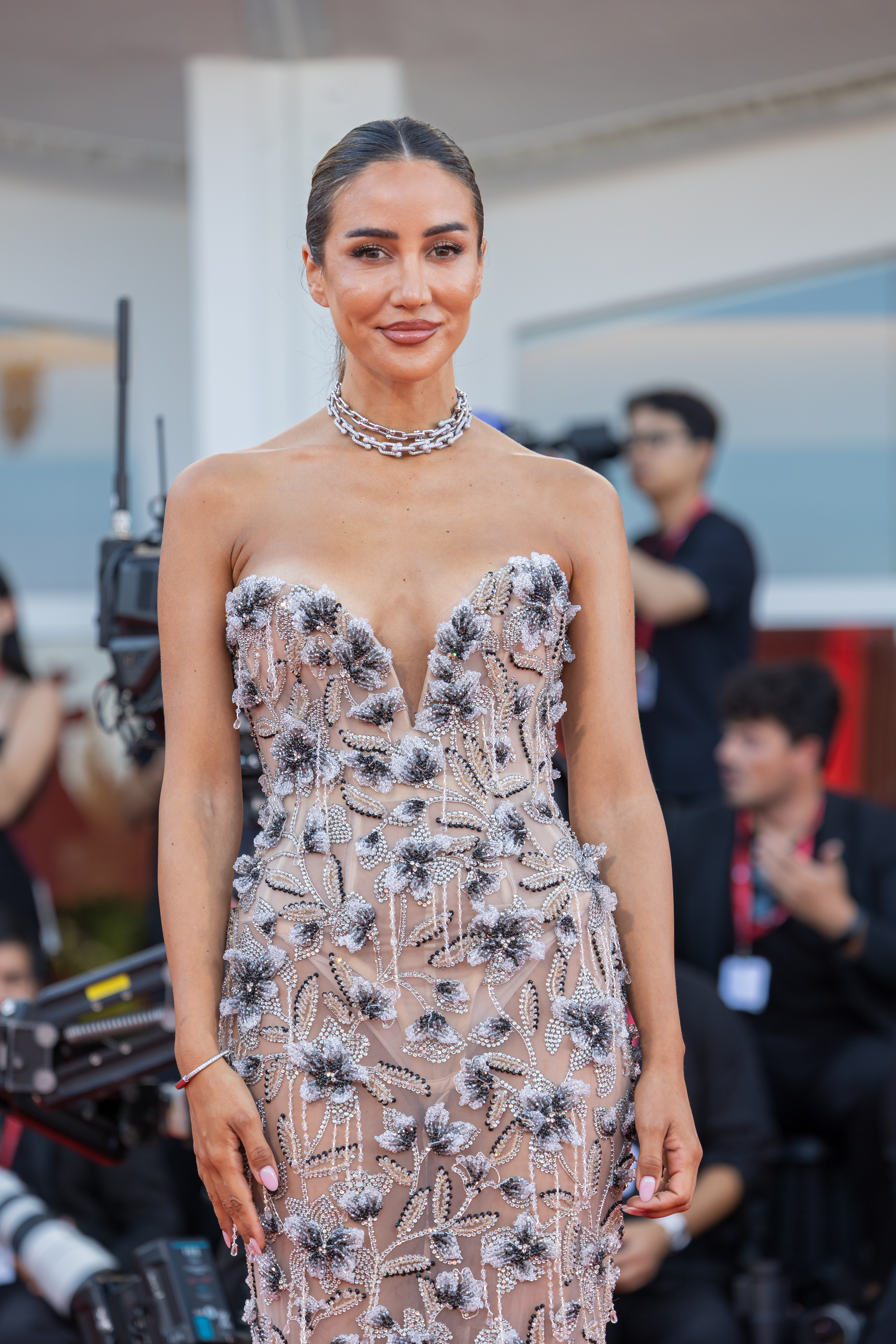
- Tamara at 82nd Venice Film Festival 2025.
- Born: March 16, 1989 (age 37); Sarajevo, SR Bosnia and Herzegovina, SFR Yugoslavia
- Education: University of Brighton
- Occupations: fashion blogger; youtuber
- Years active: 2011–present
- Height: 171 cm (5 ft 7 in)
- Spouse: Filippo Testa (m. 2026)

Tamara Kalinic (Serbian: Тамара Калинић / Tamara Kalinić) born March 16, 1989) is a Serbian fashion blogger, YouTuber and socialite.

== Biography ==
=== Early life ===
Tamara was born in Sarajevo, SR Bosnia and Herzegovina, SFR Yugoslavia to Serbian parents. From the age of 3, Tamara's family relocated to Novi Sad, Serbia, where she spent her formative years before eventually moving to Brighton, United Kingdom, in order to study at the University of Brighton. There, she earned her Master of Pharmacy. She eventually gave up this profession and devoted herself to fashion.

=== Fashion career ===
Tamara took her first steps into the fashion world in 2011, when she started her fashion blog called Glam & Glitter. On the blog she gives fashion advice and shows outfit inspiration, but also publishes her diary, where she shares her experiences and achievements.

Almost simultaneously with the blog, Tamara started her YouTube channel in 2012, where she has been sharing her insights on cosmetics, makeup, clothing and recorded her shopping hauls. As of 2024, her videos have amassed a total of more than 100 million views. She also has over 1.5 million followers on Instagram.

Since 2014, Tamara regularly participates in prestigious fashion events where she often appears as a model. These events include Paris Fashion Week, London Fashion Week, Milan Fashion Week and New York Fashion Week. In addition to fashion weeks, she shows up at fashion shows of individual brands, such as Pinko, Calzedonia, Fendi or Valentino. She also attends other notable cultural events, such as Cannes Film Festival.

Tamara has collaborated with some brands, such as shoe brand Ricagno or Emporio Armani watches.. Most travel, hotel and vacations are brand sponsorships & undisclosed paid ads.

Tamara has been featured on the covers of various publications, such as Grazia and Cosmopolitan (amongst others). She received media coverage from many fashion and lifestyle magazines in various languages, including international titles such as Elle, Vogue, Grazia, Wonderland, Harper’s Bazaar, as well as Spanish La Vanguardia and ¡Hola! or Italian Amica.

She also has been named one of Elle Style Awards' influencers of the Year in 2017 and one of the UK’s top 100 influencers by The Times in 2019.

In 2023, Tamara featured in a short film called The Editor in The Elevator made for Vogue.

In 2024, Tamara has got her own TV show called Sa Tamarom kroz Beograd (transl. With Tamara through Belgrade).

In November 2025, Tamara Kalinić launched Noa, a science-led wellness brand developed with her family of pharmacists. These supplements to date have not been proven to work and have no published reviews.

== Personal life ==
In 2024, she became engaged to Filippo Testa, an Italian manager for fashion brands. They met in 2020 at a fashion event in Paris.

In 2021, thieves broke into her apartment in Paris, causing losses of more than 300,000 euros. A similar incident occurred in 2024, when her suitcase was stolen on her way to Venice.
