= Dragovci =

- Village
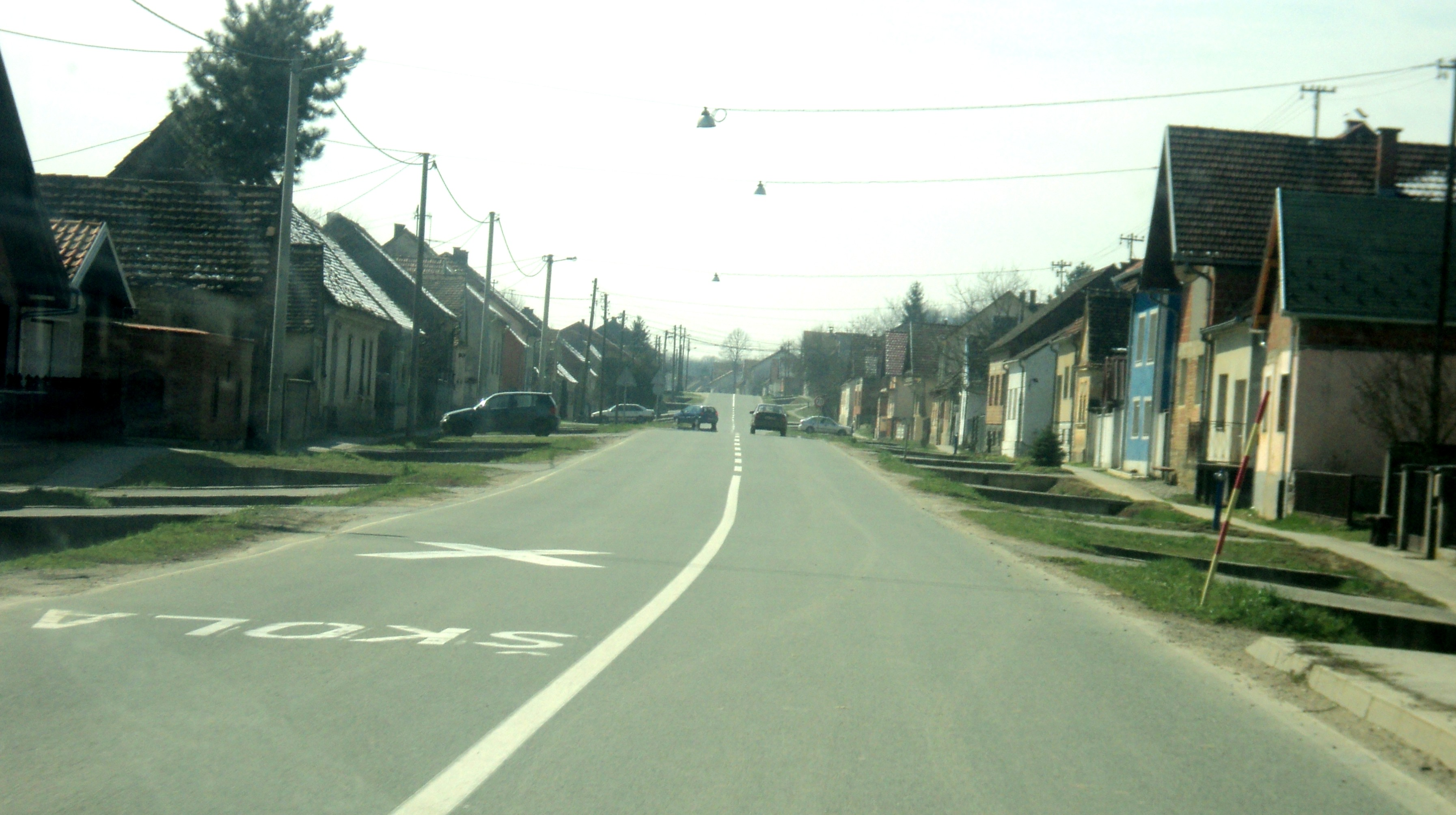

- Location within Croatia
- Coordinates: 45°13′N 17°42′E
- Country: Croatia
- County: Brod-Posavina County
- Municipality: Nova Kapela

Area
  - Total: 10.5 km^{2} (4.1 sq mi)

Population (2021)
  - Total: 264
  - Density: 25.1/km^{2} (65.1/sq mi)
- Time zone: UTC+1 (CET)
  - Summer (DST): UTC+2 (CEST)

Dragovci is a village in Croatia.
