= Pleternica =

- Town
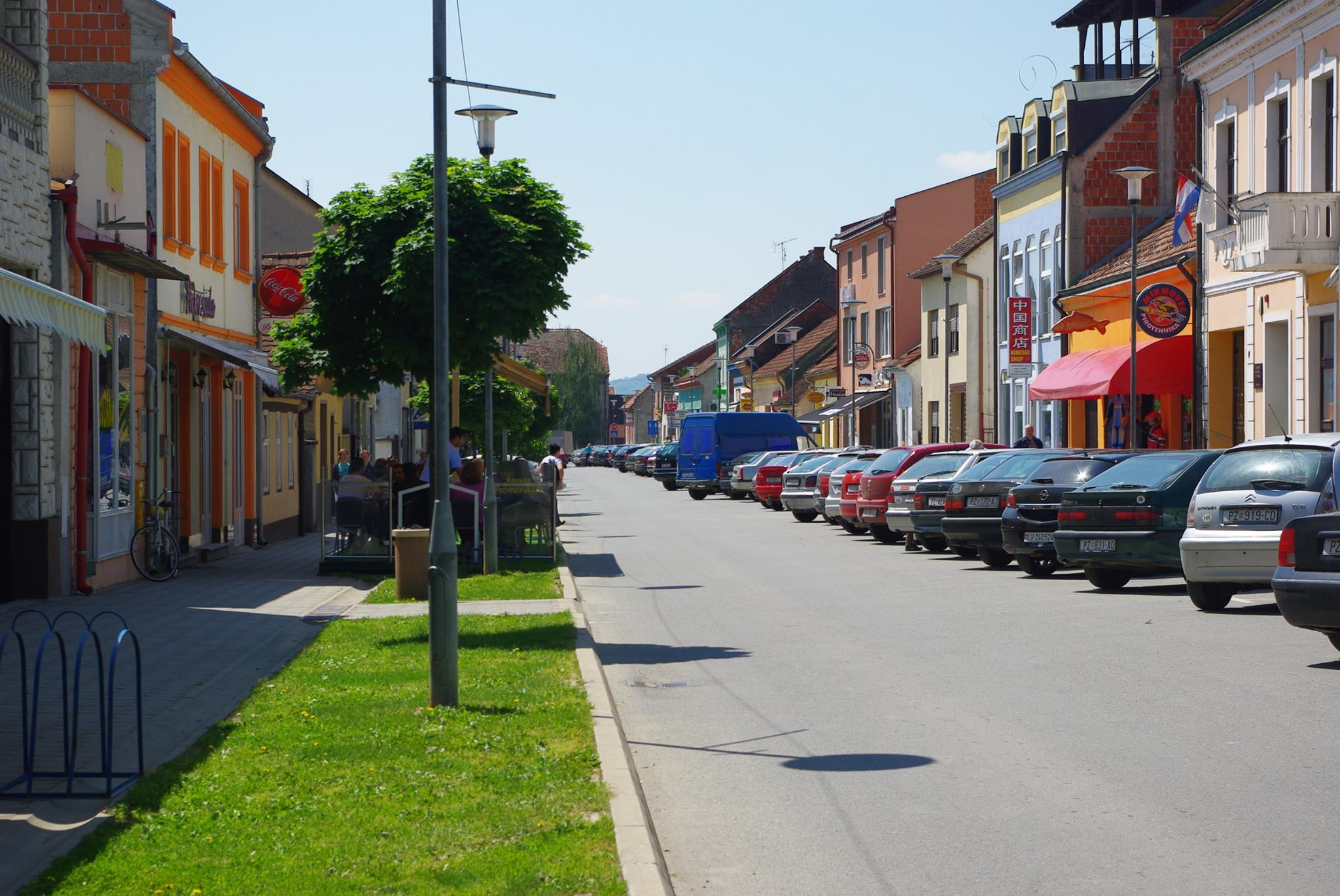
- Pleternica main street

- Location of Pleternica in Croatia
- Coordinates: 45.29°N 17.81°E
- Country: Croatia
- Region: Slavonia (Požega Valley)
- County: Požega-Slavonia County

Government
  - Mayor: Antonija Jozić (HDZ)

Area
  - Town: 206.6 km^{2} (79.8 sq mi)
  - Urban: 12.9 km^{2} (5.0 sq mi)

Population (2021)
  - Town: 9,138
  - Density: 44.23/km^{2} (114.6/sq mi)
  - Urban: 2,895
  - Urban density: 224/km^{2} (581/sq mi)
- Time zone: UTC+1 (Central European Time)
- Website: pleternica.hr

Pleternica is a town in the region of Slavonia, Croatia, 12 km (7.5 mi) southeast of Požega, in the Požega Valley (Požeška kotlina). The population of the municipality is 9,138, with 2,895 in Pleternica itself (2021).

Pleternica is located at the confluence of the river Londža into the Orljava river, at the foot of the mountain Požeška Gora; elevation 153 m (502 ft).

== Settlements ==
As of 2011, the municipality consists of 38 settlements:

- Ašikovci, population 91
- Bilice, population 188
- Blacko, population 226
- Brđani, population 49
- Bresnica, population 218
- Brodski Drenovac, population 686
- Bučje, population 318
- Buk, population 192
- Bzenica, population 96
- Ćosinac, population 54
- Frkljevci, population 345
- Gradac, population 937
- Kadanovci, population 213
- Kalinić, population 59
- Knežci, population 61
- Komorica, population 188
- Kuzmica, population 454
- Lakušija, population 78
- Mali Bilač, population 21
- Mihaljevići, population 2
- Novoselci, population 195
- Pleternica, population 3,418
- Pleternički Mihaljevci, population 15
- Poloje, population 87
- Požeška Koprivnica, population 246
- Ratkovica, population 224
- Resnik, population 307
- Sesvete, population 128
- Srednje Selo, population 285
- Sulkovci, population 537
- Svilna, population 139
- Trapari, population 178
- Tulnik, population 22
- Vesela, population 159
- Viškovci, population 234
- Vrčin Dol, population 2
- Zagrađe, population 492
- Zarilac, population 176
Town of Pleternica: Population trends 1857–2021
v

population	5930	6188	6245	8037	9011	10663	10845	11625	11731	12195	12953	13705	13393	13119	12883	11323	9138
	1857	1869	1880	1890	1900	1910	1921	1931	1948	1953	1961	1971	1981	1991	2001	2011	2021

Sources: Croatian Bureau of Statistics publications

== See also ==
- Pleter 91 submachine gun was named after this town.

== Bibliography ==
=== Biology ===
- Šašić, Martina; Nahirnić, Ana; Tarmann, Gerhard M. (2016-12-31). "Zygaenidae (Lepidoptera) in the Lepidoptera collections of the Croatian Natural History Museum". Natura Croatica: Periodicum Musei Historiae Naturalis Croatici. 25 (2): 233–248. doi:10.20302/NC.2016.25.19. eISSN 1848-7386.
