= Brodski Drenovac =

- Village
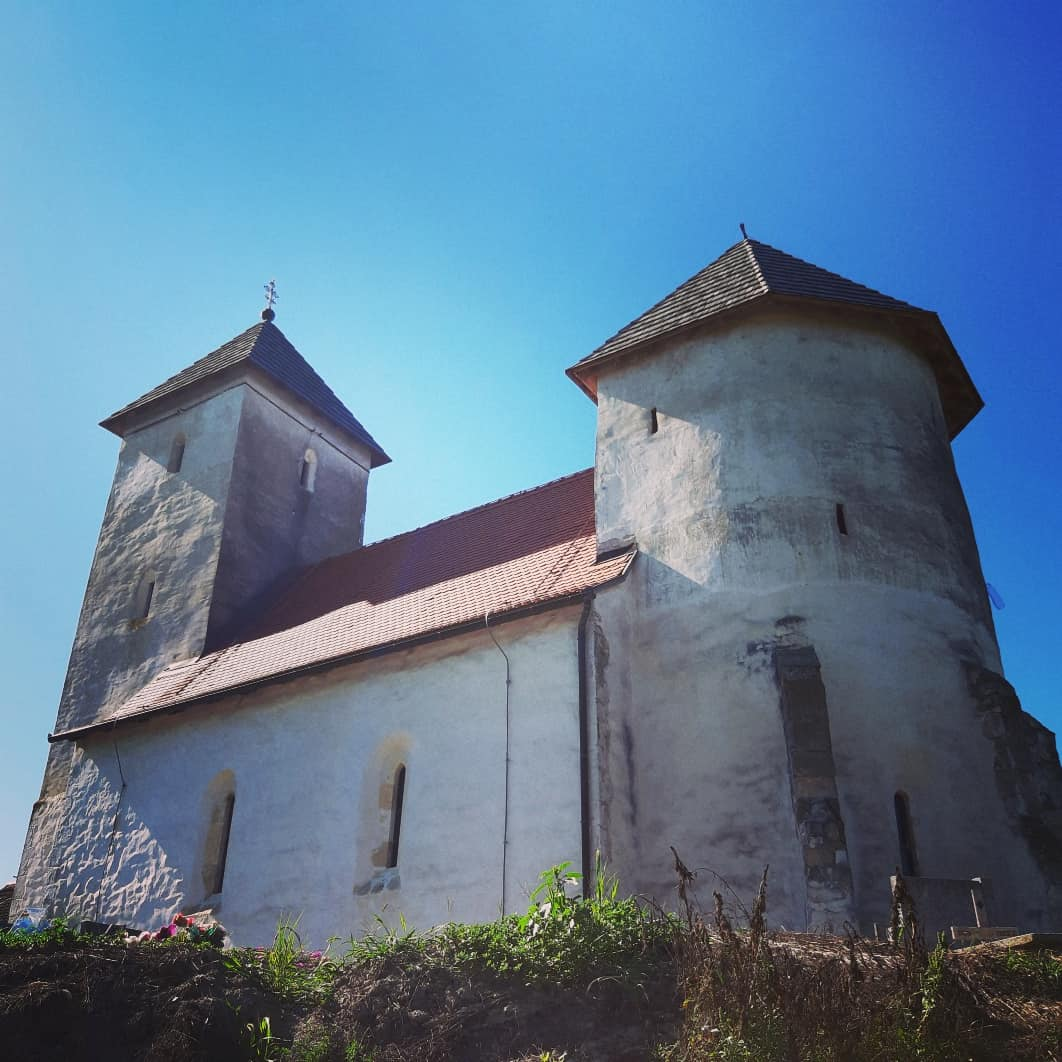
- Brodski Drenovac

- Location within Croatia
- Coordinates: 45°13′18″N 17°44′59″E
- Country: Croatia
- Region: Slavonia
- County: Požega-Slavonia County
- City: Pleternica

Area
  - Total: 22.3 km^{2} (8.6 sq mi)
- Elevation: 116 m (381 ft)

Population (2021)
  - Total: 532
  - Density: 23.9/km^{2} (61.8/sq mi)
- Time zone: UTC+1 (CET)
  - Summer (DST): UTC+2 (CEST)
- Postal code: 34310
- Area code: 034

Brodski Drenovac is a village in Požega-Slavonia County, Croatia. The village is administered as a part of the City of Pleternica.

According to the national census of 2011, the population of the village is 686.
