= Požega Valley =

Geographic region of Slavonia in Croatia

Coordinates: 45°22′N 17°44′E

Požega Valley Požeška kotlina
- Geographic region of Croatia^{a}
- Požega Valley on a map of Croatia; Požega Valley
- Country: Croatia
- Largest city: Požega

Area^{b}
  - Total: 1,249 km^{2} (482 sq mi)

Population (2011)^{b}
  - Total: 60,599
  - Density: 48.52/km^{2} (125.7/sq mi)
- ^{a} Požega Valley is not designated as an official region, it is a geographic region only.^{b} The figure is an approximation based on the territorial span and population of the municipalities bounded by Psunj, Papuk, Krndija, Požeška Gora and Dilj mountains and hills.

The Požega Valley (Croatian: Požeška kotlina) is a geographic microregion of Croatia, located in central Slavonia, encompassing the eastern part of the Požega-Slavonia County. It is located in the Pannonian Basin, bounded by Psunj, Papuk and Krndija mountains from west and north, and Požeška Gora and Dilj from south and east, as the Pannonian plain is interspersed by horst and graben structures. The largest settlement in the region is the city of Požega, followed by Pleternica and Kutjevo. The main watercourse in the region is Orljava River. The region covers 1,249 square kilometres (482 square miles) and has a population of 60,599.

The Požega Valley was first inhabited in the prehistoric era, with archaeological finds spanning the Neolithic to classical antiquity and the Early Middle Ages, the period to which the oldest surviving historical records of the region date. Between the 13th and the 16th centuries, the region was organized as the centre of the Požega County and a royal estate. Ottoman rule in the region lasted for about 150 years—from the 1530s to the 1680s. During that time, the area was the centre of Sanjak of Pojega. Subsequently, the city of Osijek became the administrative and military centre of the newly formed Kingdom of Slavonia from Požega.

== Geography ==
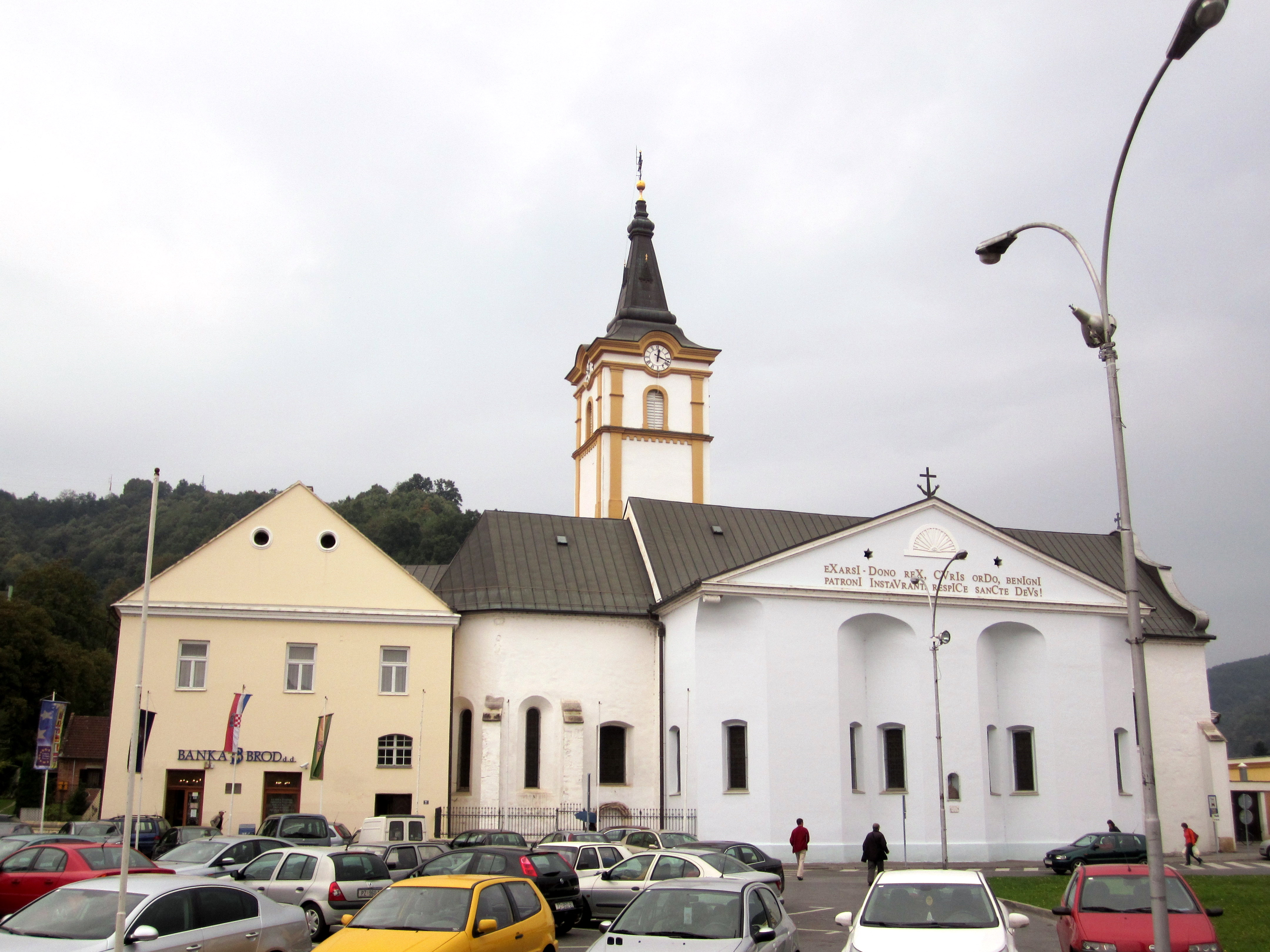
Požega is the largest settlement of the region.

The Požega Valley is a geographic microregion of Croatia, located in central Slavonia, enveloped by the Slavonian mountains. It consists of southern slopes of 984-metre (3,228 ft) Psunj, 953-metre (3,127 ft) Papuk, and 792-metre (2,598 ft) The Krndija mountains, the northern slopes of 618-metre (2,028 ft) Požeška Gora and 461-metre (1,512 ft) the Dilj hills, and lowland is surrounded by the mountains and hills—occupying the eastern part of Požega-Slavonia County.

The main watercourse in the region is the 89 kilometres (55 miles) long Orljava River, rising in Psunj, flowing along the southern rim of the valley through Požega and Pleternica before leaving the valley through a gap between Požeška Gora and Dilj near its confluence with the Sava River. It receives water from numerous smaller watercourses—Londža is the most significant. The region, as with most of Croatia, enjoys a moderately warm and rainy continental climate as defined by the Köppen climate classification.

The region encompasses three cities—Kutjevo, Pleternica and Požega—and five municipalities—Brestovac, Čaglin, Jakšić, Kaptol and Velika. The largest settlement in the region is the city of Požega, with an urban population of 19,506. The region's 1,249 square kilometres (482 square miles) supports a population of 60,599, with a population density of 48.518/km^{2} (125.66/sq mi).

Cities and municipalities of the Požega Valley by area and population size
City or municipality	Area	Population
Brestovac	279 km^{2} (108 sq mi)	3,726
Čaglin	180 km^{2} (69 sq mi)	2,723
Jakšić	44 km^{2} (17 sq mi)	4,058
Kaptol	85 km^{2} (33 sq mi)	3,472
Kutjevo	174 km^{2} (67 sq mi)	6,247
Pleternica	198 km^{2} (76 sq mi)	11,323
Požega	134 km^{2} (52 sq mi)	26,248
Velika	155 km^{2} (60 sq mi)	5,607
TOTAL	1,249 km^{2} (482 sq mi)	63,404
Note: All the cities and municipalities are a part of the Požega-Slavonia County. Sources: Croatian Bureau of Statistics, Spatial plan of the Požega-Slavonia County

== Geology ==
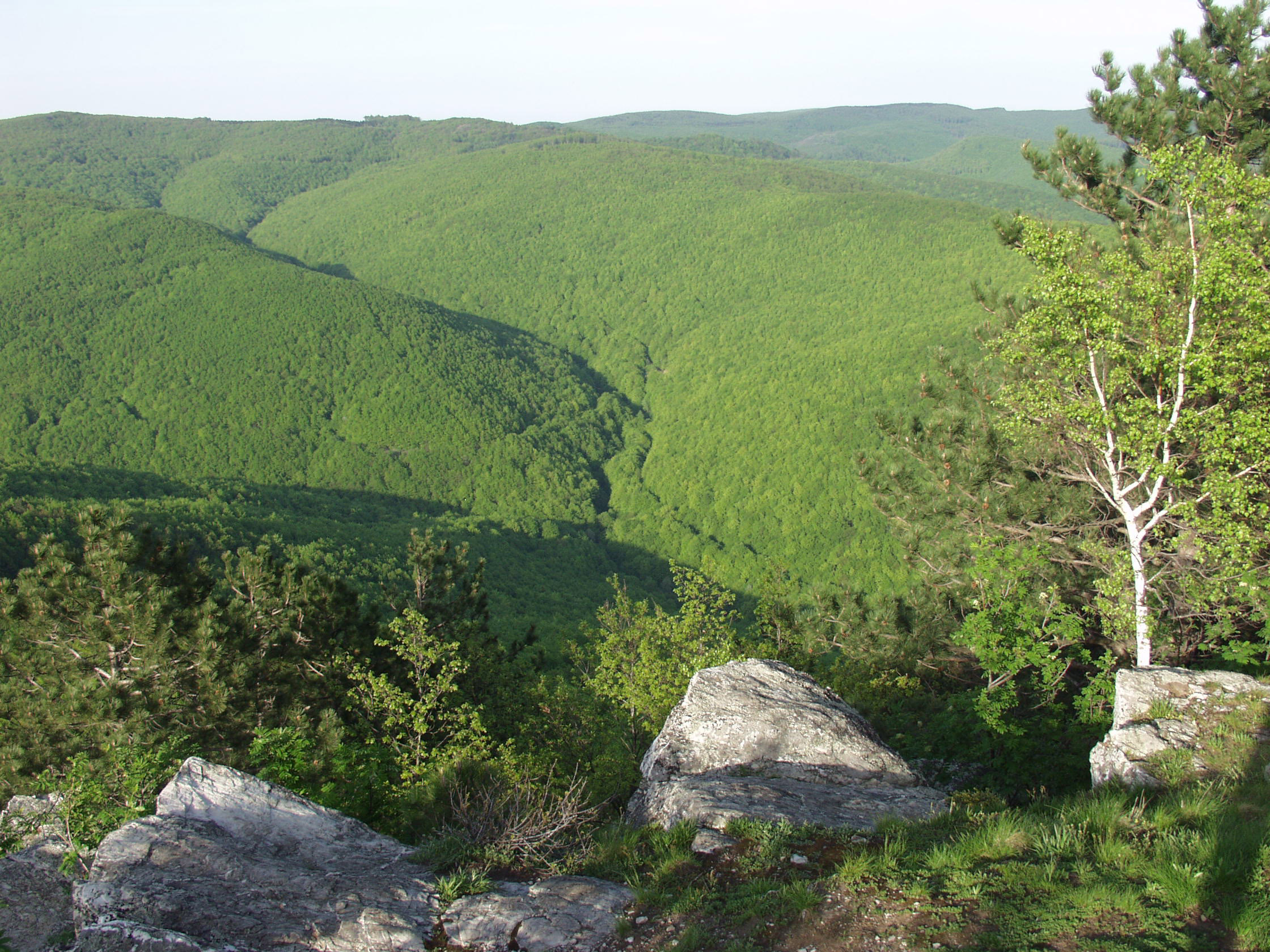
Papuk flanks the Požega Valley from the north

The Požega Valley is entirely located in the Pannonian Basin, one of three major geomorphological parts of Croatia. The Pannonian Basin took shape through Miocenian thinning and the subsidence of crust structures formed during Late Paleozoic Variscan orogeny. The Paleozoic and Mesozoic structures are visible in the mountains and hills surrounding the valley. The processes also led to the formation of a stratovolcanic chain in the basin 17 – 12 Mya (million years ago) and intensified subsidence observed until 5 Mya as well as flood basalts about 7.5 Mya.

Contemporary uplift of the Carpathian Mountains prevented water flowing to the Black Sea, and the Pannonian Sea formed in the basin. Sediments were transported to the basin from the uplifting of the Carpathian and Dinaric mountains, with particularly deep fluvial sediments deposited during the Pleistocene with the uplift of the Transdanubian Mountains. Ultimately, up to 3,000 metres (9,800 feet) of the sediment was deposited in the basin, and the Pannonian Sea eventually drained through the Iron Gate gorge. In the southern Pannonian Basin, the Neogene to Quaternary sediment depth is normally lower, averaging 500 to 1,500 metres (1,600 to 4,900 feet).

The results of those processes are large plains in eastern Slavonia, Baranya and Syrmia, as well as in river valleys. The plains are interspersed by horst and graben structures, which are believed to have broken the Pannonian Sea surface as islands. Psunj, Papuk and Krndija consist mostly of Paleozoic rocks that are 350 – 300 million years old. Požeška Gora and Dilj consist of much more recent Neogene rocks, but Požeška Gora also contains Upper Cretaceous sediments and igneous rocks forming the main 30-kilometre (19 mi) ridge of the hill and representing the largest igneous landform in Croatia. A smaller igneous landform is also present on Papuk, near Voćin. The two mountains are possible remnants of a volcanic arc related to Alpine orogeny—uplifting of the Dinaric Alps.

== History ==
=== From the first settlements to the Middle Ages ===
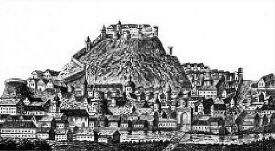
The medieval city of Požega

The Požega Valley has been inhabited since prehistory, as confirmed by remnants of Neolithic Starčevo culture discovered near Požega, as well as Copper and Iron Age finds discovered in areas of Požega, Jakšić and Kaptol. The valley was the site of the Roman city of Incerum, thought to have been located in an area between present-day Požega and Velika, where remnants of a Roman villa and graves have been found. The Romans called the valley Golden Valley (Latin: Vallis Aurea, Croatian: Zlatna dolina), and the name is still affectionally used. Finds dated to the Early Middle Ages include 9th-century Avar and Slavic culture items and a 12th-century Benedictine abbey in Rudine at the foot of Psunj. Rudine represents the most important early medieval archaeological find in the region, and items found there include a glagolitic inscription dated to 1129.

Historic records from 1210 describe the region as a part of Požega County and the medieval Kingdom of Croatia, with Požega as the county seat, a fortress (1227) and a royal estate belonging to queens of Hungary. In the 13th and 14th centuries, Franciscans and Dominicans established abbeys in Požega. Cistercians established an abbey in Kutjevo and initiated the region's winegrowing and winemaking traditions. The Cistercian wine cellar in Kutjevo has continuously supported winemaking since it was completed in 1232, making it the oldest continuously-operated winery in Croatia. In the early 13th century, the capitulum of the Roman Catholic Diocese of Pécs was established in Kaptol, containing a public archive of the region. The archive operated until 1536, when it was evacuated to Hungary ahead of the Ottoman army. The archive was returned to the Croatian State Archives in 1960.

=== Ottoman Empire and Austria-Hungary ===
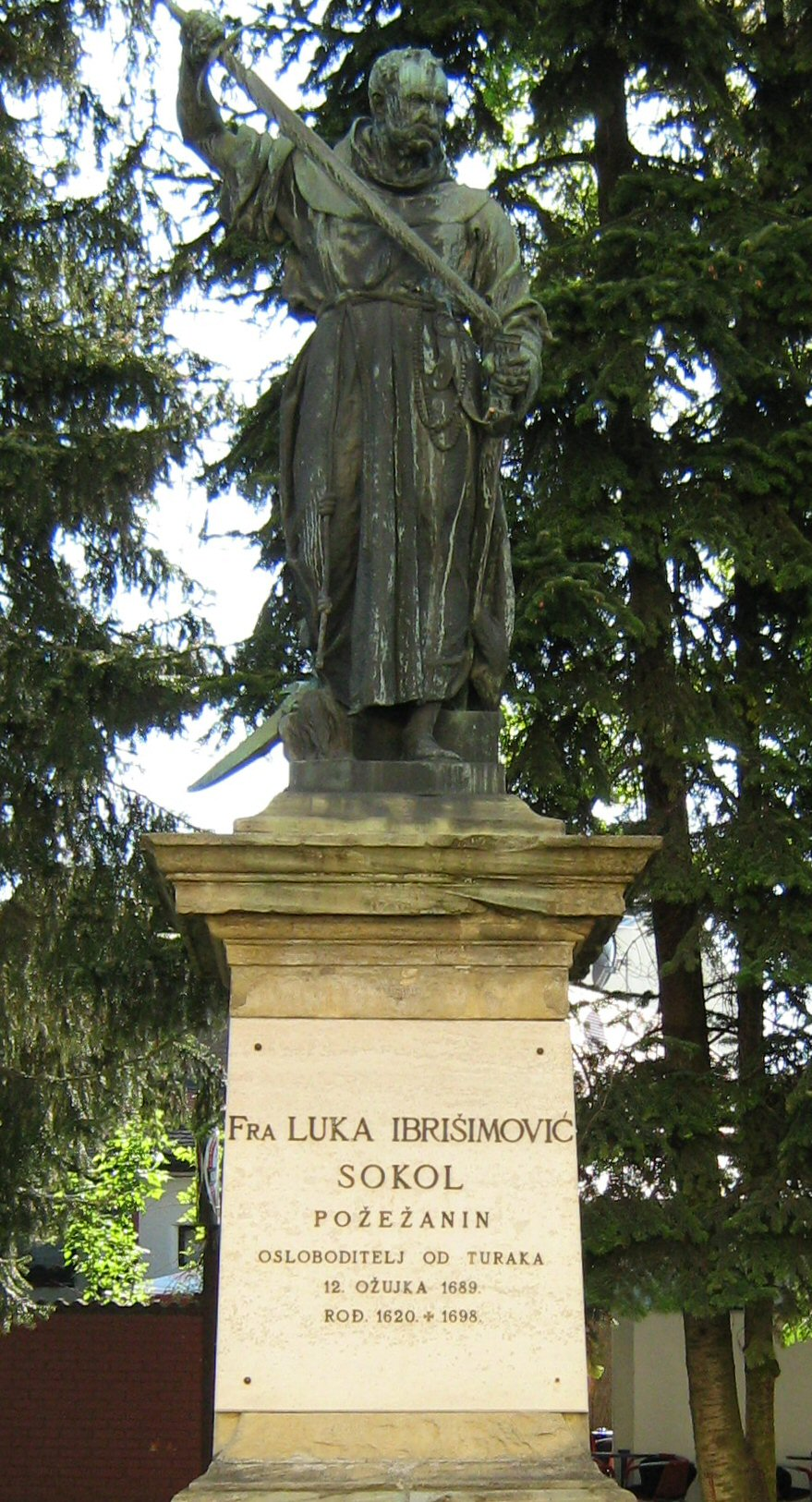
Luka Ibrišimović led a revolt against the Ottomans in Požega.

Following the Battle of Mohács, the Ottomans expanded their possessions in Slavonia by seizing Đakovo in 1536 and Požega in 1537. In 1540, as Osijek came under Ottoman control, regular administration in Slavonia was introduced by the establishment of the Sanjak of Pojega. Ottoman control in Slavonia expanded and by 1552 conquest was complete. During the Great Turkish War (1667–1698), the Ottomans abandoned the region in 1687 and finally liberated in 1689 when Luka Ibrišimović led a revolt in Požega. Subsequently, as Požega County was restored in the region, Osijek became the administrative and military centre of the newly formed Kingdom of Slavonia, unseating Požega.

Following the Croatian–Hungarian Settlement of 1868, the kingdoms of Croatia and Slavonia were united as the Kingdom of Croatia-Slavonia. After Austria-Hungary occupied Bosnia and Herzegovina following the 1878 Treaty of Berlin, the Croatian and Slavonian Military Frontier territory returned to Croatia-Slavonia in 1881, pursuant to provisions of the settlement, removing the region from the immediate frontier of Croatia.

=== Yugoslavia and independent Croatia ===
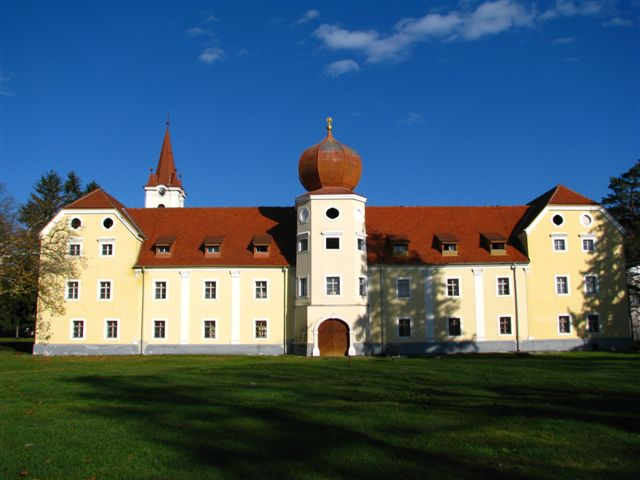
17th-century Kutjevo manor – the site of a winery in continuous operation since 1232

On 29 October 1918, the Croatian Sabor declared independence and joined the newly formed State of Slovenes, Croats and Serbs, which in turn entered into union with the Kingdom of Serbia on 4 December 1918 to form the Kingdom of Serbs, Croats, and Slovenes. The new kingdom abolished traditional subdivisions of Croatia, including Požega County, in 1922 when oblasts were introduced, succeeded by the banovinas of Yugoslavia. The Cvetković–Maček Agreement of 1939 created the autonomous Banovina of Croatia, incorporating the region. In April 1941, Yugoslavia was occupied by Germany and Italy. Following the invasion the region was incorporated into the Independent State of Croatia, a Nazi-backed puppet state as a zone under German occupation for the war's duration. Armed resistance soon developed in the country, and by 1942, controlled substantial territories, especially in Slavonia's mountains. After World War II, the region became a part of the Socialist Croatia within the Communist Yugoslavia.

In the 1980s the political situation in Yugoslavia deteriorated. In 1990 the Communist Party fragmented along national lines. That same year, the first multi-party elections were held in Croatia, with Franjo Tuđman's win exacerbating nationalist tensions. The Serbs in Croatia, intent on achieving independence from Croatia, declared the autonomy of areas that became the unrecognized Republic of Serbian Krajina. As tensions rose, Croatia declared independence, effective 8 October 1991. The Croatian War of Independence began when the Yugoslav National Army and various Serb paramilitaries attacked Croatia. By the end of 1991, a high intensity war fought along a wide front reduced government control to about two-thirds of its historic territory. Western Slavonia was occupied in August 1991, following an advance by the Yugoslav forces north from Banja Luka across the Sava River cutting the primary communication route to the nation's capital. This was partially pushed back by the Croatian Army in operations named Otkos 10 and Orkan 91 that established a front line around Okučani and south of Pakrac. The line held virtually unchanged for more than three years until Operation Flash in May 1995 when full access to the region was restored.
