= Topography of Croatia =

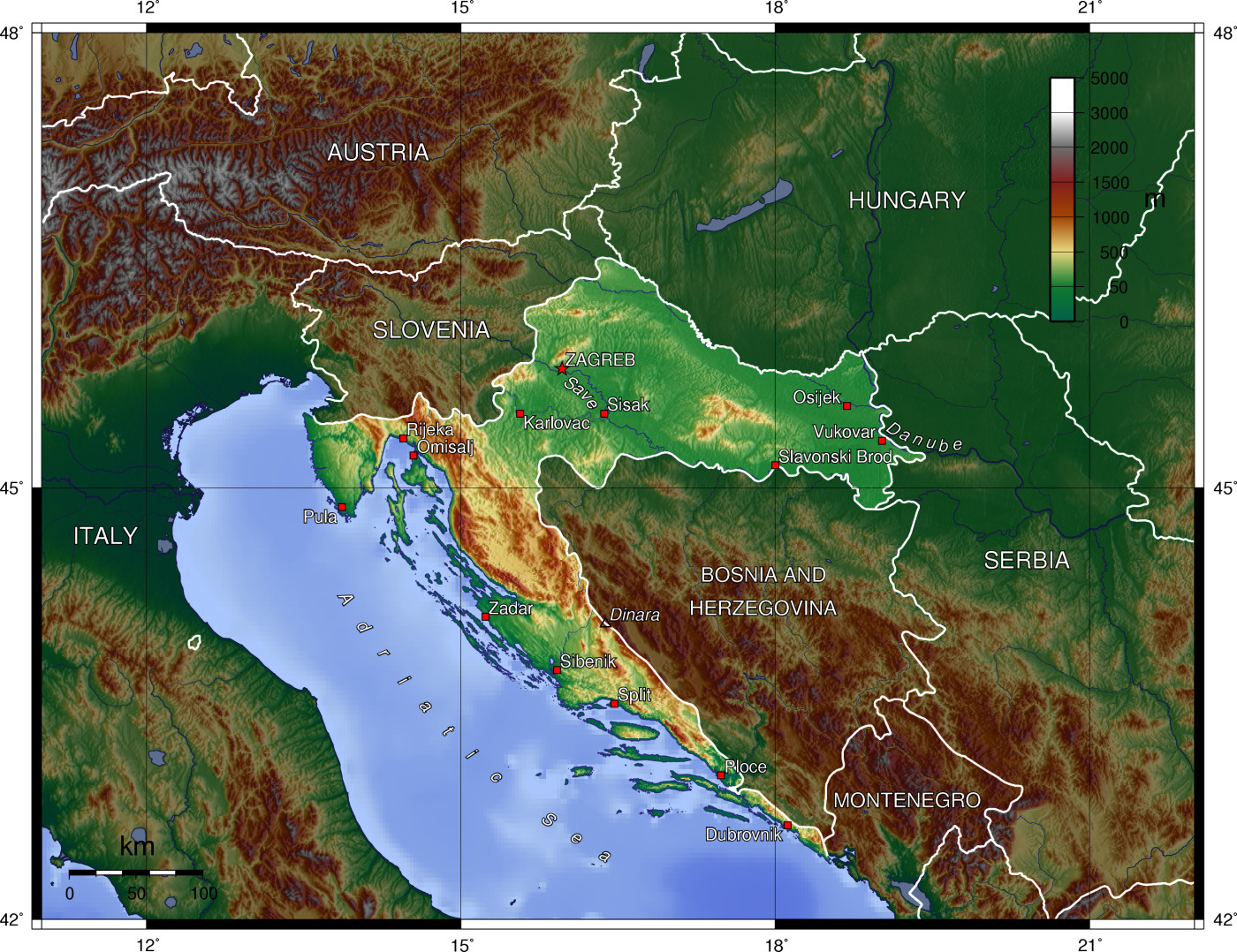
Topographic map of Croatia

Topography of Croatia is defined through three major geomorphological parts of the country. Those are the Pannonian Basin, the Dinaric Alps, and the Adriatic Basin. The largest part of Croatia consists of lowlands, with elevations of less than 200 metres (660 feet) above sea level recorded in 53.42% of the country. Bulk of the lowlands are found in the northern regions of the country, especially in Slavonia, itself a part of the Pannonian Basin plain. The plains are interspersed by the horst and graben structures, believed to break the Pannonian Sea surface as islands. The greatest concentration of ground at relatively high elevations is found in Lika and Gorski Kotar areas in the Dinaric Alps, but such areas are found in all regions of Croatia to some extent. The Dinaric Alps contain the highest mountain in Croatia—1,831-metre (6,007 ft) Dinara, as well as all other mountains in Croatia higher than 1,500 metres (4,900 feet). Croatia's Adriatic Sea mainland coast is 1,777.3 kilometres (1,104.4 miles) long, while its 1,246 islands and islets encompass further 4,058 kilometres (2,522 miles) of coastline—the most indented coastline in the Mediterranean. Karst topography makes up about half of Croatia and is especially prominent in the Dinaric Alps, as well as throughout the coastal areas and the islands.

== Geomorphological units ==
The largest part of Croatia consists of lowlands, with elevations of less than 200 metres (660 feet) above sea level recorded in 53.42% of the country. Bulk of the lowlands are found in the northern regions of the country, especially in Slavonia, representing a part of the Pannonian Basin. Territory with elevations of 200 to 500 metres (660 to 1,640 feet) above sea level encompasses 25.61% of Croatia's territory, and the areas between 500 and 1,000 metres (1,600 and 3,300 feet) above sea level cover the 17.11% of the country. Further 3.71% of the land is situated at 1,000 to 1,500 metres (3,300 to 4,900 feet) above sea level, and only 0.15% of Croatia's territory lies at elevations greater than 1,500 metres (4,900 feet) above sea level. The greatest concentration of ground at relatively high elevations is found in Lika and Gorski Kotar areas in the Dinaric Alps, but such areas are found in all regions of Croatia to some extent. The Pannonian Basin and the Dinaric Alps, along with the Adriatic Basin represent major geomorphological parts of Croatia.

=== Adriatic Basin ===
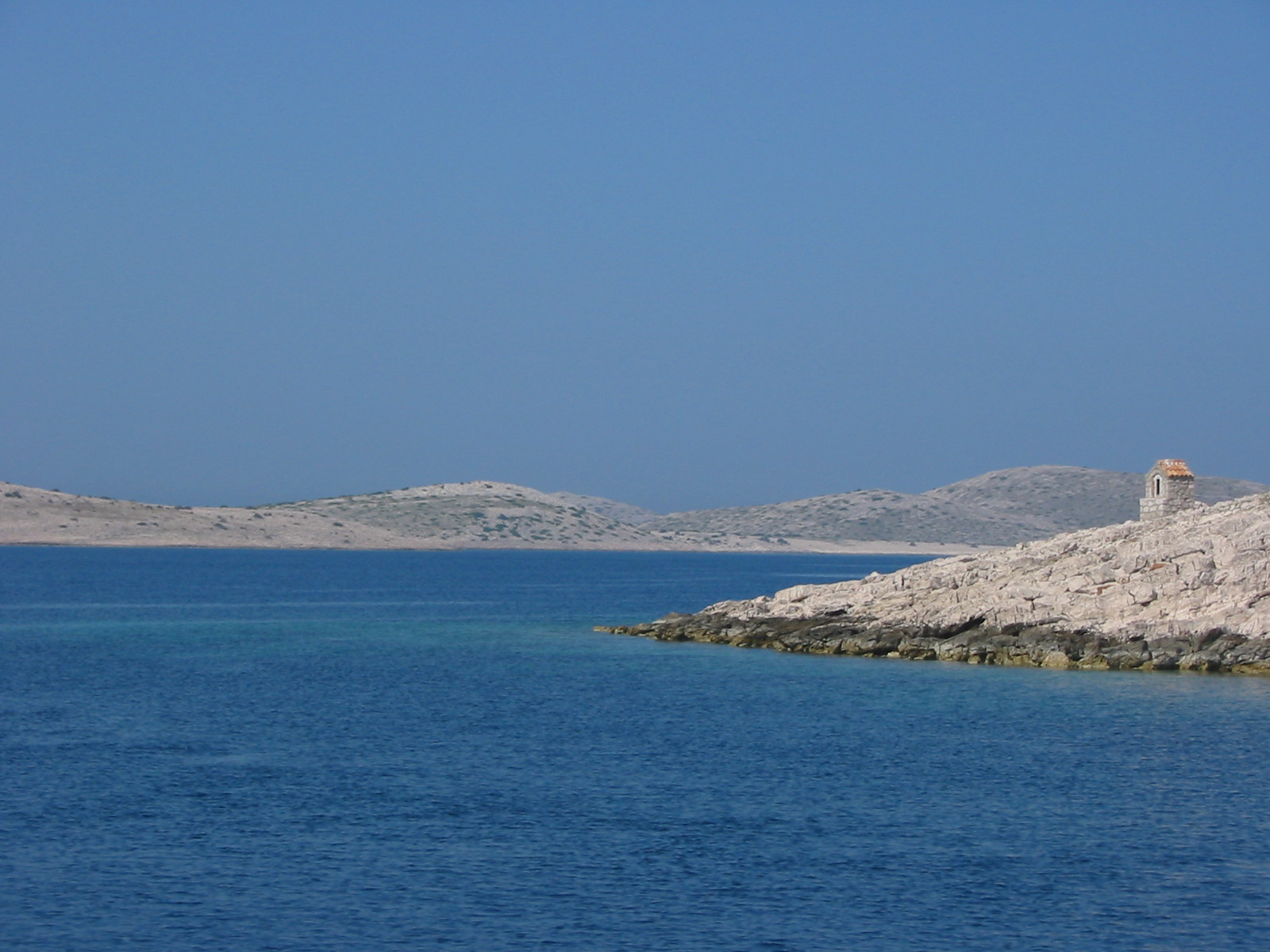
Kornati national park

Croatia's Adriatic Sea mainland coast is 1,777.3 kilometres (1,104.4 miles) long, while its 1,246 islands and islets encompass further 4,058 kilometres (2,522 miles) of coastline. The distance between the extreme points of Croatia's coastline is 526 kilometres (327 miles). The number of islands includes all islands, islets, and rocks of all sizes, including ones emerging at ebb tide only. The islands include the largest ones in the Adriatic—Cres and Krk, each covering 405.78 square kilometres (156.67 square miles), and the tallest—Brač, whose peak reaches 780 metres (2,560 feet) above sea level. The islands include 48 permanently inhabited ones, the most populous among them being Krk and Korčula.

The shore is the most indented coastline in the Mediterranean. The majority of the coast is characterised by a karst topography, developed from the Adriatic Carbonate Platform. Karstification there largely began after the final uplift of the Dinarides in the Oligocene and the Miocene, when carbonate deposits were exposed to atmospheric effects, extending to the level of 120 metres (390 feet) below present sea level, exposed during the Last Glacial Maximum. It is estimated that some karst formations are related to earlier immersions, most notably the Messinian salinity crisis. The largest part of the eastern coast consists of carbonate rocks, while flysch is significantly represented in the Gulf of Trieste coast, on the Kvarner Gulf coast opposite Krk, and in Dalmatia north of Split. There are comparably small alluvial areas of the Adriatic coast in Croatia—most notably the Neretva Delta. The western Istria is gradually subsiding, having sunk about 1.5 metres (4 feet 11 inches) in the past two thousand years. In the Middle Adriatic Basin, there is evidence of Permian volcanism observed in area of Komiža on the island of Vis and as volcanic islands of Jabuka and Brusnik.

=== Dinaric Alps ===
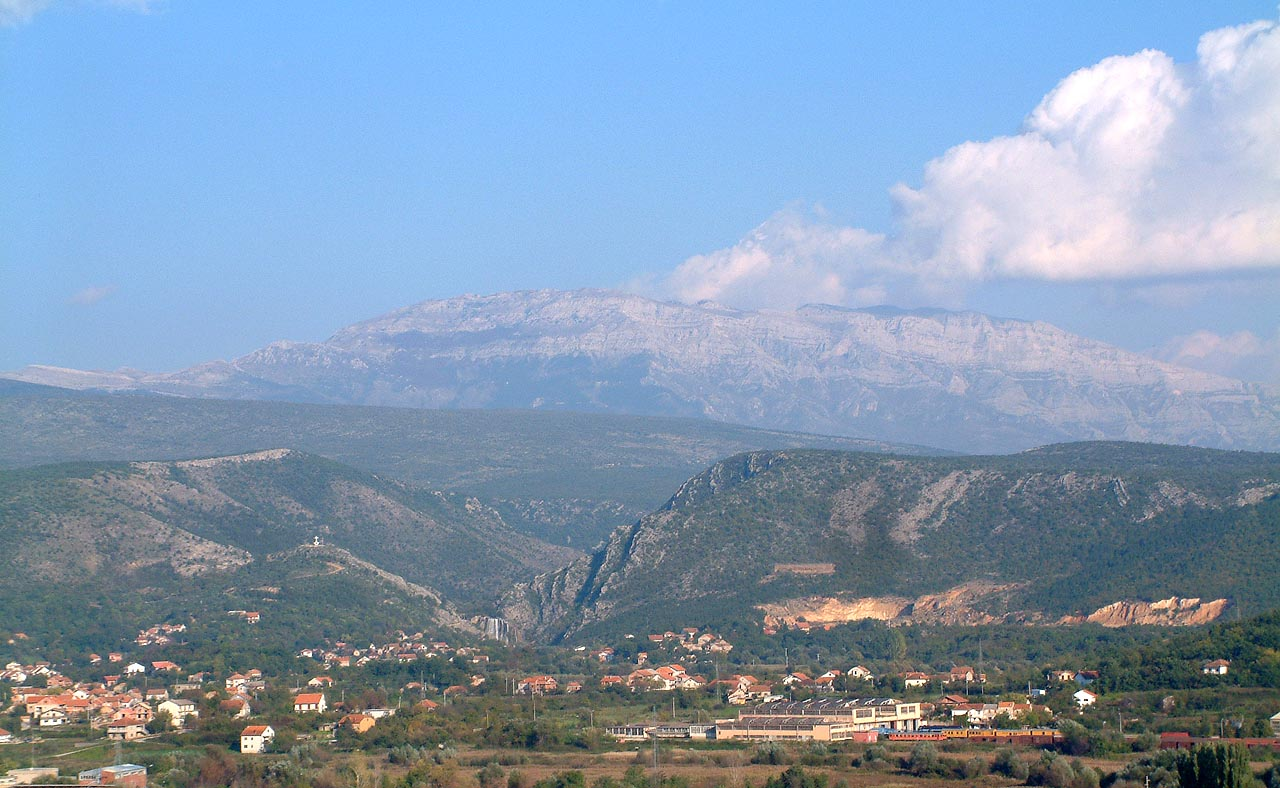
Dinara seen from Knin

Formation of the Dinaric Alps is linked to a Late Jurassic to recent fold and thrust belt, itself a part of Alpine orogeny, extending southeast from the southern Alps. The Dinaric Alps in Croatia encompass the entire Gorski Kotar and Lika regions, as well as considerable parts of Dalmatia, with their northeastern edge running from 1,181-metre (3,875 ft) Žumberak to Banovina region, along the Sava River, and their westernmost landforms being 1,272-metre (4,173 ft) Ćićarija and 1,396-metre (4,580 ft) Učka mountains in Istria. The Dinaric Alps contain the highest mountain in Croatia—1,831-metre (6,007 ft) Dinara, as well as all other mountains in Croatia higher than 1,500 metres (4,900 feet)—Biokovo, Velebit, Plješivica, Velika Kapela, Risnjak, Svilaja and Snježnik.

Karst topography makes up about half of Croatia and is especially prominent in the Dinaric Alps. There are numerous caves in Croatia, 49 of which deeper than 250 metres (820.21 feet), 14 deeper than 500 metres (1,640.42 feet) and three deeper than 1,000 metres (3,280.84 feet). The longest cave in Croatia, Kita Gaćešina, is at the same time the longest cave in the Dinaric Alps at 37,389 metres (122,667 feet).

Highest mountain peaks of Croatia
Mountain	Peak	Elevation	Coordinates
Dinara	Dinara	1,831 m (6,007 ft)	44°3′N 16°23′E
Biokovo	Sveti Jure	1,762 m (5,781 ft)	43°20′N 17°03′E
Velebit	Vaganski vrh	1,757 m (5,764 ft)	44°32′N 15°14′E
Plješivica	Ozeblin	1,657 m (5,436 ft)	44°47′N 15°45′E
Velika Kapela	Bjelolasica – Kula	1,533 m (5,030 ft)	45°16′N 14°58′E
Risnjak	Risnjak	1,528 m (5,013 ft)	45°25′N 14°45′E
Svilaja	Svilaja	1,508 m (4,948 ft)	43°49′N 16°27′E
Snježnik	Snježnik	1,506 m (4,941 ft)	45°26′N 14°35′E

=== Pannonian Basin ===
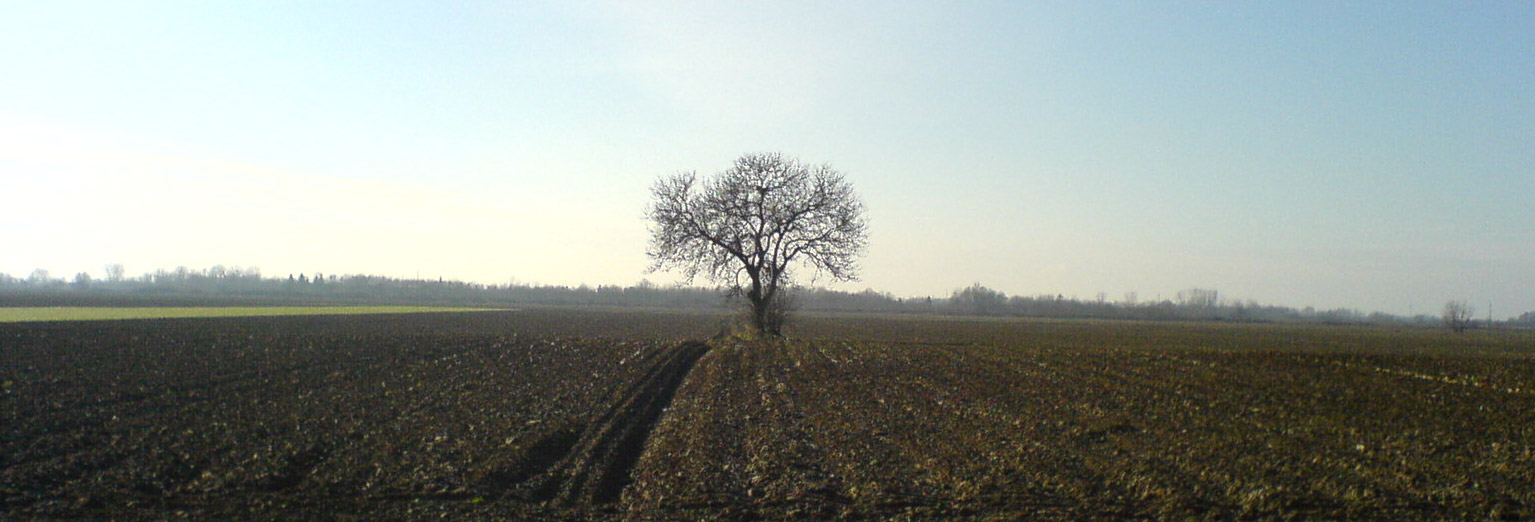
A plain in Slavonia

The Pannonian Basin took shape through Miocenian thinning and subsidence of crust structures formed during Late Paleozoic Variscan orogeny. The Paleozoic and Mesozoic structures are visible in Papuk and other Slavonian mountains. The processes also led to formation of a stratovolcanic chain in the basin 17 – 12 Mya and intensified subsidence observed until 5 Mya as well as flood basalts about 7.5 Mya. Contemporary uplift of the Carpathian Mountains severed water flow to the Black Sea and Pannonian Sea formed in the basin. Sediment were transported to the basin from uplifting Carpathian and Dinaric mountains, with particularly deep fluvial sediments being deposited in the Pleistocene during uplift of the Transdanubian Mountains. Ultimately, up to 3,000 metres (9,800 feet) of the sediment was deposited in the basin, and the sea eventually drained through the Iron Gate gorge.

The results of those processes are large plains in the eastern Slavonia, Baranya and Syrmia, as well as in river valleys, especially along Sava, Drava and Kupa. The plains are interspersed by the horst and graben structures, believed to break the Pannonian Sea surface as islands. The tallest among such landforms are 1,059-metre (3,474 ft) Ivanšćica and 1,035-metre (3,396 ft) Medvednica north of Zagreb and in Hrvatsko Zagorje as well as 984-metre (3,228 ft) Psunj and 953-metre (3,127 ft) Papuk which are the tallest among the Slavonian mountains surrounding Požega. Psunj, Papuk and adjacent Krndija consist mostly of Paleozoic rocks which are 350 – 300 million years old. Požeška gora, adjacent to Psunj, consists of much more recent Neogene rocks, but there are also Upper Cretaceous sediments and igneous rocks forming the main, 30-kilometre (19 mi) ridge of the hill and representing the largest igneous landform in Croatia. A smaller igneous landform is also present on Papuk, near Voćin. The two, as well as Moslavačka gora are possible remnants of a volcanic arc related to uplifting of the Dinaric Alps.

== See also ==
- Geography of Croatia
