= Pannonian Sea =

Shallow ancient sea where the Pannonian Basin in Central Europe is today

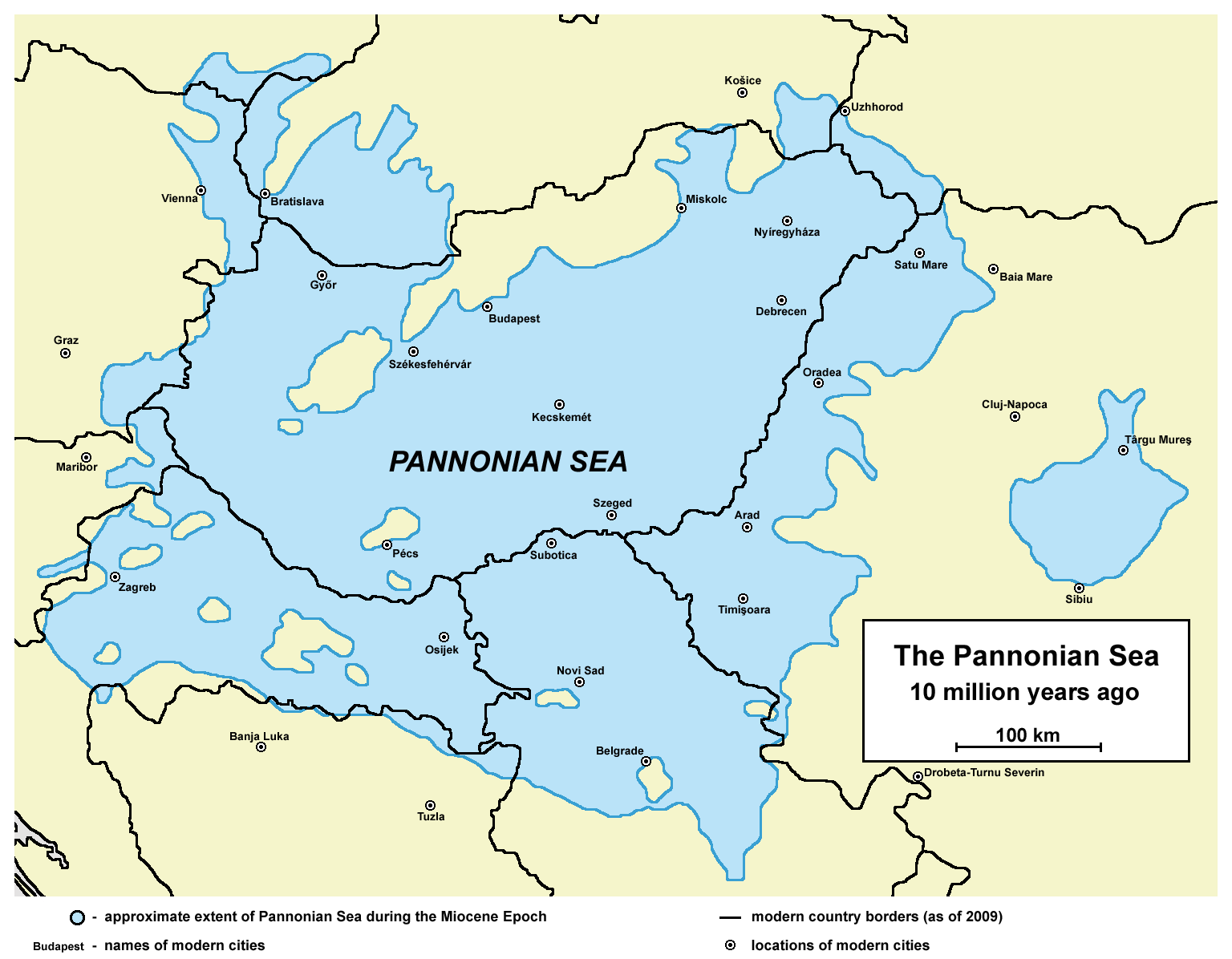
Approximate extent of the Pannonian Sea during the Miocene Epoch; modern-day political borders and settlements superimposed for reference.

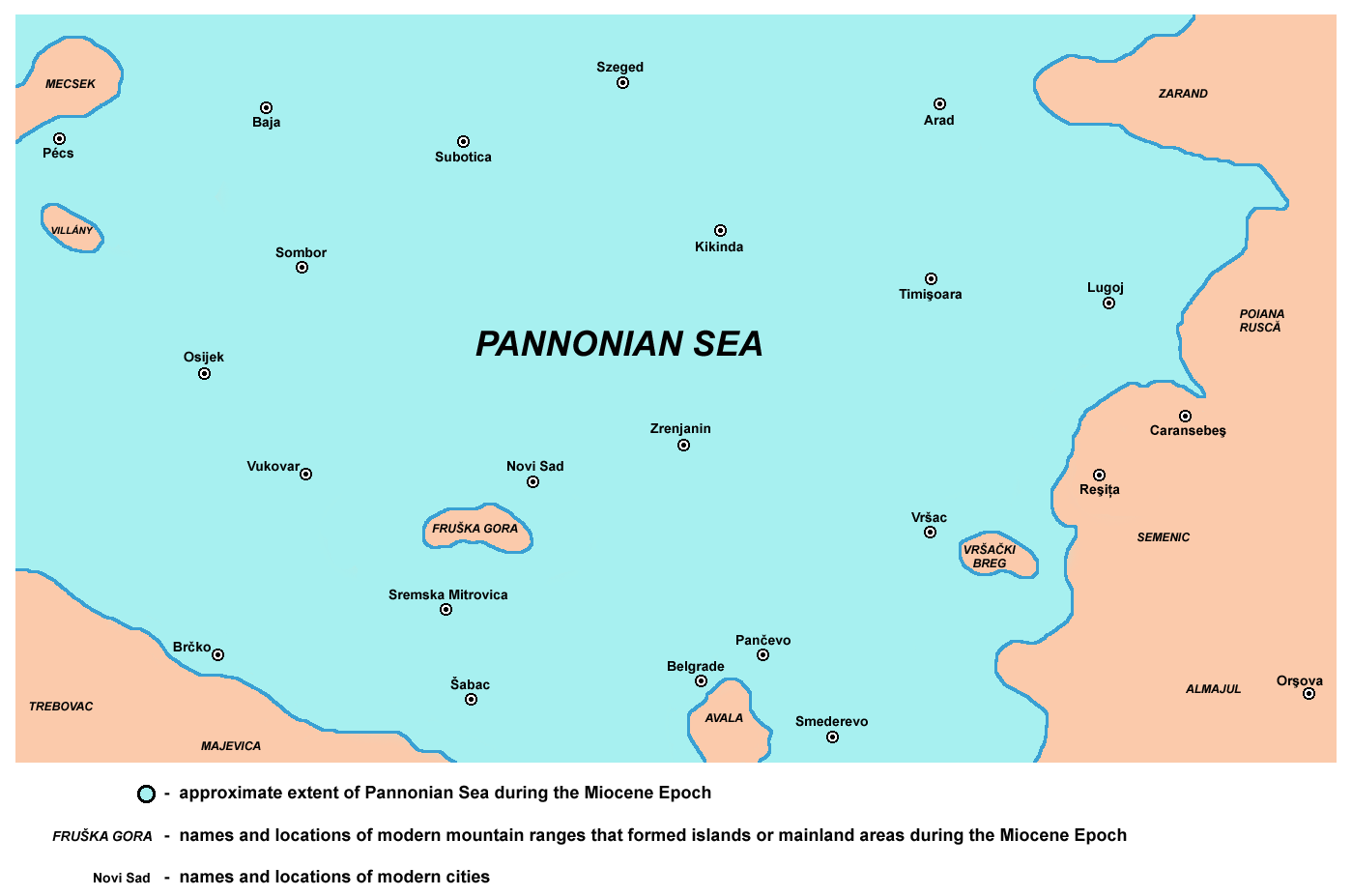
Detailed map of the south-eastern part of Pannonian Sea during the Miocene Epoch.

The Pannonian Sea was a shallow ancient sea, where the Pannonian Basin in Central Europe is now. During its history it lost its connections with the neighbouring seas and became surrounded completely by land. The Pannonian Sea existed from about 10 Ma (million years ago) until 1 Ma, during the Miocene and Pliocene epochs, when marine sediments were deposited to a depth of 3–4 km (1.9–2.5 mi) in the Pannonian Basin.

== History ==
The Pannonian Sea, for most of its history, was part of the Paratethys Sea, until about 10 million years ago, when a Miocene uplift of the Carpathian Mountains isolated the sea from the rest of Paratethys.

During its first historical phase, the Pannonian Sea had a western connection with the Mediterranean Sea through the territories of the modern Ligurian Sea, Bavaria, and Vienna Basin. Through the Đerdap Strait, the Pannonian Sea was linked to the Paratethys in the Wallachian-Pontic Basin. The Pannonian Sea was also attached to the Aegean Sea through the modern Preševo Valley.

The Pannonian Sea existed for about 9 million years. Throughout its diverse history the salinity of the sea often shifted. The decrease of salinity resulted in endemic fauna. Eventually, the sea lost its connection to the Paratethys and became a lake permanently (Pannonian Lake). Its last remnant, the Slavonian Lake, dried up in the Pleistocene epoch. The remnants of the former islands of the Pannonian Sea are the modern Pannonian island mountains (Mecsek, Papuk, Psunj, Krndija, Dilj, Fruška Gora, and Vršac Mountains). Despite their location, Lake Balaton and Lake Neusiedl, which appeared during the last 20,000 years, have no relation to the ancient sea.

== See also ==
- Paratethys – Prehistoric shallow inland sea in Eurasia
- Pannonian Basin, also known as Pannonian Plain – Sedimentary basin in Central Europe
- Piemont-Liguria Ocean – Former piece of oceanic crust that is seen as part of the Tethys Ocean
- Iron Gates – Gorge on the river Danube between Serbia and Romania
