= Pannonian island mountains =

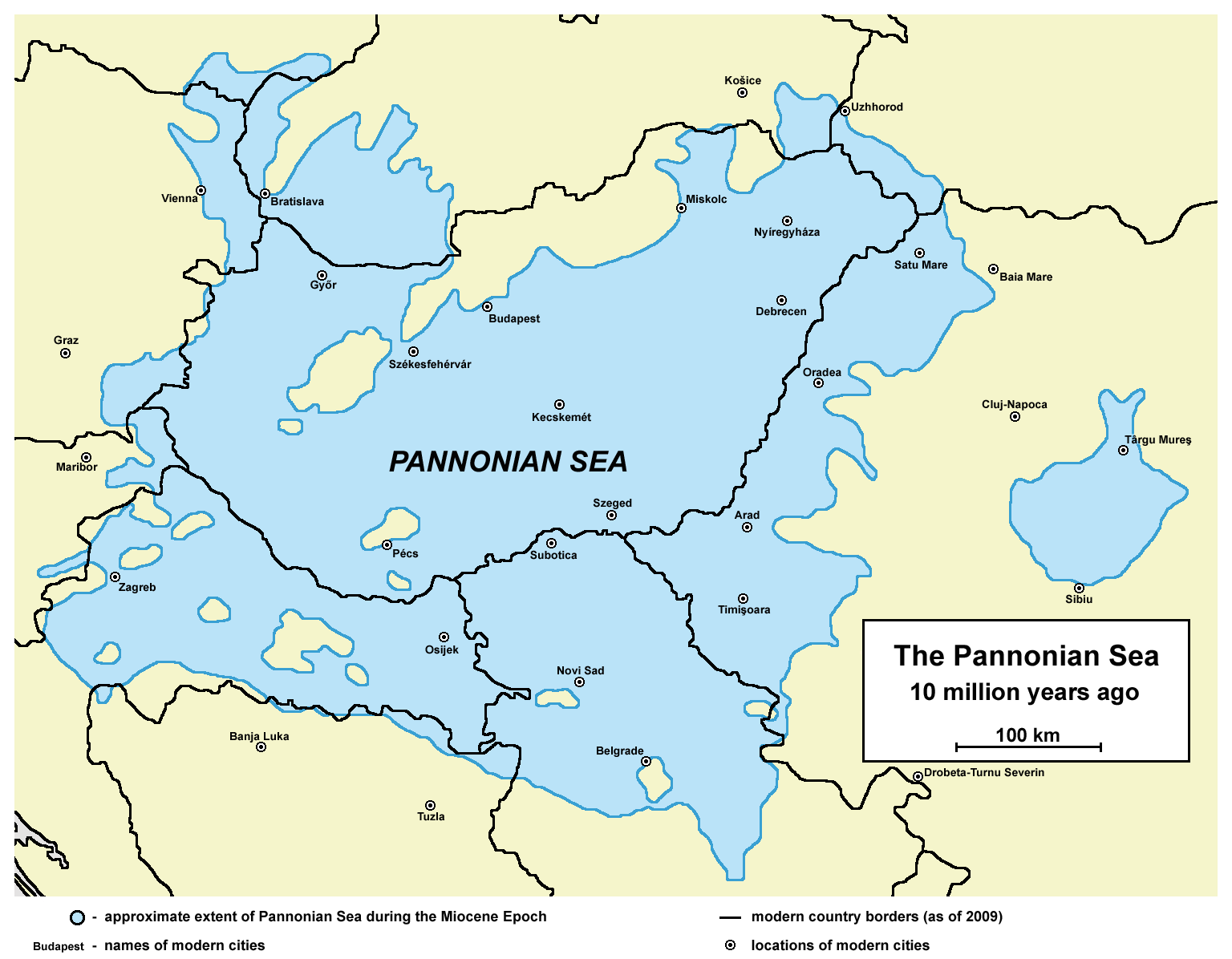
Approximate extent of the Pannonian Sea during the Miocene Epoch. Current borders and settlements superimposed for reference.

The Pannonian island mountains (Serbian: Панонске острвске планине / Panonske ostrvske planine, Croatian: Panonske otočne planine) is a term for isolated mountains scattered across the Pannonian Plain, chiefly its western and southern parts, in Hungary, Serbia and Croatia. In prehistoric times, these mountains were islands of the ancient Pannonian Sea that disappeared about 600,000 years ago.

The island mountains include:

Croatia

- Central Slavonian Mountains:
  - Dilj
  - Krndija
  - Papuk
  - Psunj
  - Požeška Gora
- Medvednica in western Croatia

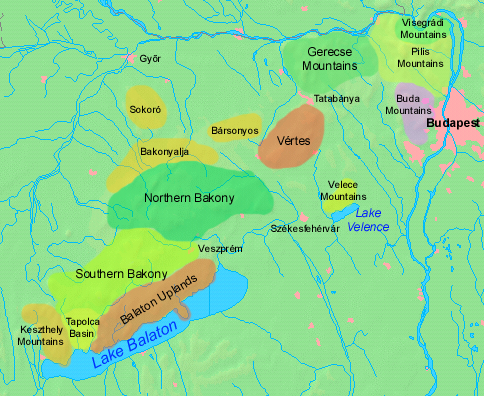
Transdanubian Mountains in Hungary

Hungary

- Transdanubian Mountains of western Hungary:
  - Bakony
  - Buda Hills
  - Gerecse
  - Pilis Mountains
  - Vértes Hills
  - Velence Mountains
- Mecsek, in south Hungary
- Kőszeg Mountains (Geschriebenstein), on Hungary–Austria border
- Baranya Hills

Serbia

- Fruška Gora
- Vršac Mountains
- Avala
- Kosmaj

== See also ==
- Danubian Hills of Slovakia
