= Orljava =

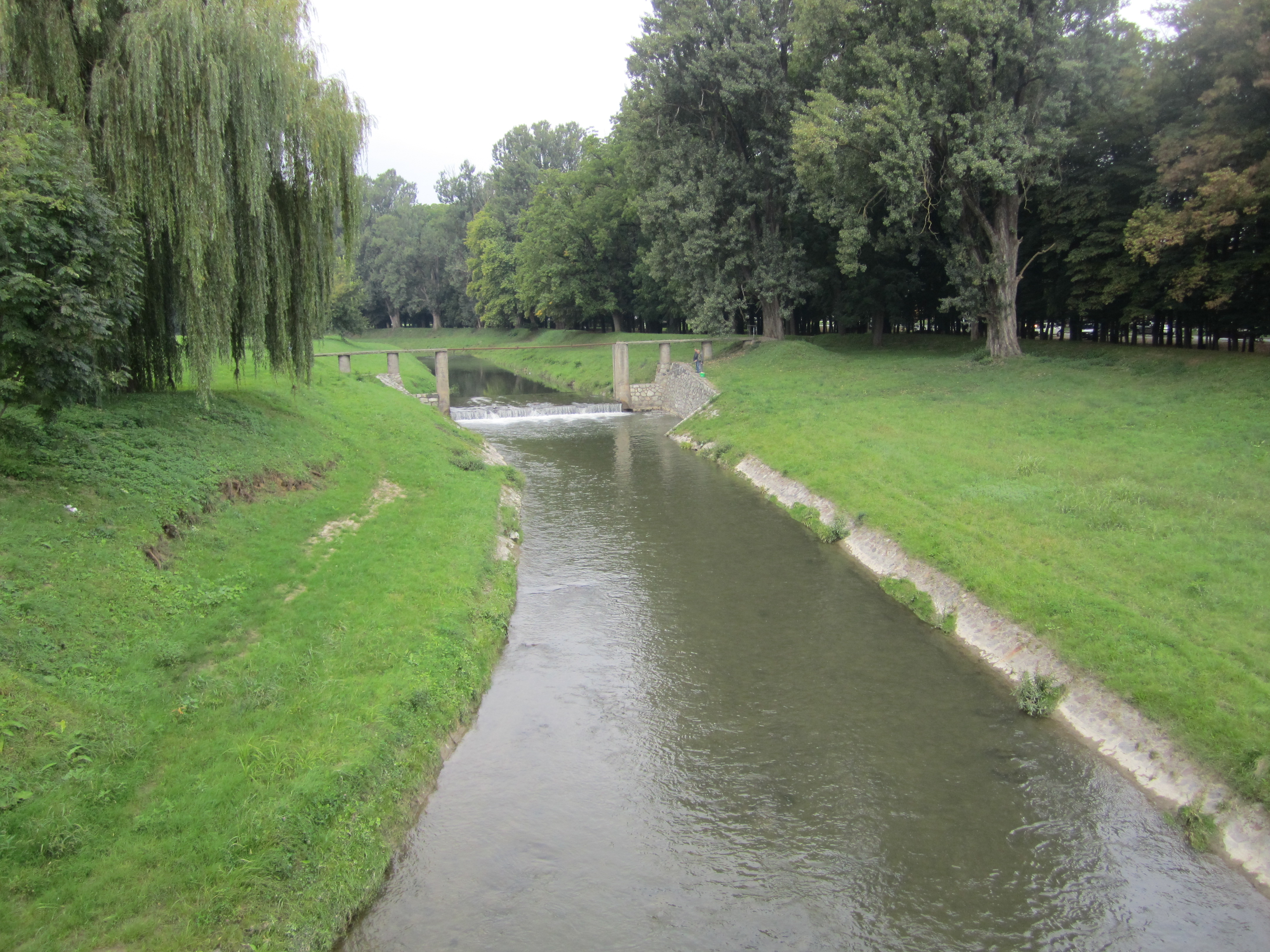
- Orljava in Požega

Location
- Country: Croatia

Physical characteristics
- Mouth
  - location: Sava
  - coordinates: 45.1068°N 17.7247°E
- Length: 87.6 km (54.4 mi)
- Basin size: 1,618 km^{2} (625 sq mi)

Basin features
- Progression: Sava→ Danube→ Black Sea

Orljava is a river in Slavonia, eastern Croatia, a left tributary of Sava. It is 87.6 kilometres (54.4 mi) long and its basin covers an area of 1,618 square kilometres (625 sq mi).

Orljava rises in the mountainous forested areas of Psunj, south of Bučje. It receives influx from smaller rivers that rise in the mountains of Papuk and Požeška gora. Near Srednje Selo it starts turning southeast, and at Pleternica it merges with the river Londža that rises in Krndija. It then runs south to pass between Požeška gora and Dilj, when it turns to the southwest. As it flows south of Dragovci, the river turns south and eventually flows into the river Sava just west of Slavonski Kobaš, at 45.106777°N 17.724656°E.

There are several etymologies suggested for the hydronym. One is that it comes from the Croatian word "oriti", meaning "echo". The other is that it comes from the Indo-European root *h1or, meaning "to flow". If so, then the same root is seen in the hydronym "Raša".
