= List of mountains in Croatia =

This is a list of mountains (Croatian: planina) in Croatia.

The highest mountains in Croatia belong to the Dinarides range that is sometimes also called Dinaric Alps, of which Dinara is the highest mountain in Croatia. Together with the easternmost parts of the Alps, these mountains span most of the country, and their orogenic activity started in the Paleozoic with the Variscan orogeny and continued in the Mesozoic and Cenozoic with the Alpine orogeny.

The mountains in the northeastern part of the country, in the Pannonian plain, are considerably older than the rest as their orogeny happened in the Paleozoic.

Mountains in the list are ordered by height.

Mountain	Peak	Height (m)
Dinara	Dinara (Sinjal) (Note: For Dinara, the highest peak on the territory of Croatia has been listed; the mountain's highest peak belongs to Bosnia and Herzegovina (Troglav, 1913 m).)	1831
Kamešnica	Kurljaj or Kamešnica (Note: Most of Kamešnica belongs to Bosnia and Herzegovina, along with its highest peak (Konj, 1855 m).)	1809
Biokovo	Sveti Jure	1762
Velebit	Vaganski vrh	1757
Plješevica	Ozeblin	1657
Velika Kapela	Bjelolasica (Kula)	1533
Risnjak	Risnjak	1528
Svilaja	Svilaja	1508
Snježnik	Snježnik	1506
Viševica	Viševica	1428
Učka	Vojak	1396
Mosor	Mosor	1339
Šibenik	Veliki Šibenik	1314
Mala Kapela	Seliški vrh	1279
Ćićarija	Veliki Plamik	1272
Sniježnica	Sniježnica	1234
Veliki Kozjak	Bat	1207
Klek	Klek	1181
Žumberačka Gora	Sveta Gera	1181
Promina	Velika Promina	1148
Bitoraj	Bitoraj	1140
Tuhobić	Tuhobić	1106
Ivanšćica	Ivanšćica	1059
Medvednica	Sljeme	1035
Psunj	Brezovo polje	984
Pelješac	Sveti Ilija	961
Papuk	Papuk	953
Rilić	Šapašnik	920
Samoborska Gora	Japetić	879
Strahinščica	Strahinščica	846
Moseč	Movran	838
Krndija	Kapovac	792
Vidova gora (Island of Brač)	Sutvid	780
Kozjak	Sveti Luka	779
Plešivica	Plešivica	777
Boraja	Crni vrh	739
Ravna Gora (Zagorje)	Ravna gora	686
Jurašinka	Jurašinka	674
Opor (mountain)	Crni krug	650
Kalničko gorje	Kalnik	642
Sveti Niko (Island of Hvar)	Sveti Nikola	627
Požeška Gora	Kapavac	618
Zrinska gora	Piramida	616
Osoršćica (Island of Lošinj)	Osoršćica	589
Klupca (Island of Korčula)	Klupca	569
Obzovo (Island of Krk)	Obzovo	568
Vodenica	Vodenica	537
Petrova Gora	Veliki Petrovac	512
Dilj	Cinkovac (Degman/Jurje brdo)	471
Bilogora	Stankov vrh	309

== See also ==
- Geography of Croatia
- List of rivers in Croatia
- List of lakes in Croatia
- Croatian Mountaineering Association

== Sources ==
- Ostroški, Ljiljana, ed. (December 2015). "Geographical and meteorological data". Statistički ljetopis Republike Hrvatske 2015 [Statistical Yearbook of the Republic of Croatia 2015] (PDF). Statistical Yearbook of the Republic of Croatia (in Croatian and English). Vol. 47. Zagreb: Croatian Bureau of Statistics. p. 48. ISSN 1333-3305.
