= Londža =

Location
- Country: Croatia

Physical characteristics
- Mouth
  - location: Orljava
  - coordinates: 45.2694°N 17.8117°E
- Length: 47 km (29 mi)
- Basin size: 562 km^{2} (217 sq mi)

Basin features
- Progression: Orljava→ Sava→ Danube→ Black Sea

Londža is a river in Slavonia, eastern Croatia, a left tributary of Orljava. It is 47 kilometres (29 mi) long and its basin covers an area of 562 km^{2} (217 square miles).

Londža rises in the southwestern slopes of the Krndija mountain, runs through Požega Valley, and flows into Orljava river near the town of Pleternica.

== Sources ==
- Londža at the Proleksis Encyclopedia (in Croatian)
