= Požeška gora =

Mountain in Croatia

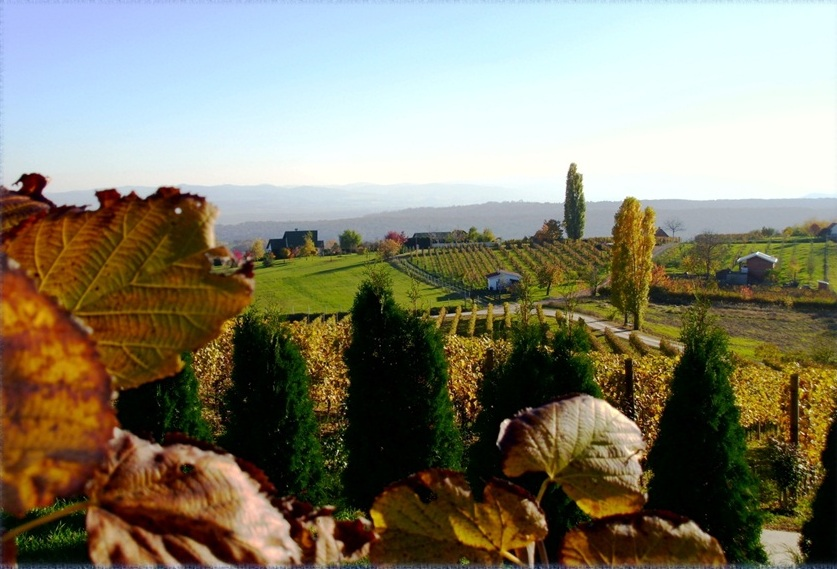
- Vineyards on Požeška gora near Pleternica

Highest point
- Elevation: 618 m (2,028 ft)
- Coordinates: 45°16′55″N 17°34′01″E

Geography
- Location within Croatia
- Location: Croatia

Požeška gora (lit. Požega Mountain) is a mountain located south of Požega, Croatia in the region of central Slavonia. The mountain is a part of Slavonian mountains enveloping the Požega Valley, located adjacent to Psunj to the east of Požeška gora, and to the west of Dilj. Požeška gora and Dilj are separated by a gap through which Orljava River flows south out of the Požega Valley. The highest peak of the mountain is Kapavac, 618 metres (2,028 feet) above sea level.

Term Babja gora is also used to refer to the mountain, although in a strict sense Babja gora is the western part of Požeška gora, with Pokotina brook representing the eastern boundary of Babja gora area. The highest peak of Požeška gora is located in Babja gora area.

== See also ==
- Geography of Croatia
- List of mountains in Croatia

== Bibliography ==
- Poljak, Željko (February 1959). "Požeška gora". Kazalo za "Hrvatski planinar" i "Naše planine" 1898—1958 (PDF). Naše planine. Vol. XI. p. 6. ISSN 0354-0650.
