= Lake Slavonia =

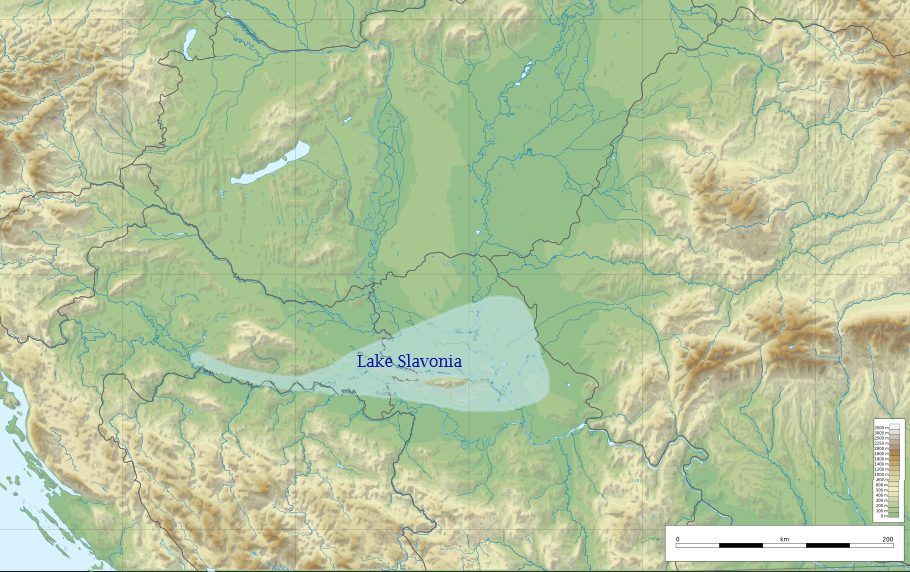
- Map of the lake
- Location: Pannonian Plain
- Type: former lake
- Basin countries: modern day Serbia, Croatia, Romania and Bosnia and Herzegovina
- Max. length: 290 kilometres (180 mi)
- Max. width: 120 kilometres (75 mi)
- Surface area: 28,000 kilometres (17,000 mi)
- Islands: Fruška Gora

The Lake Slavonia, (Note: Serbo-Croatian: Jezero Slavonija, Језеро Славонија, Hungarian: Szlavóniai-tó, Romanian: Lacul Slavonia, French: Lac de Slavonie, German: Slawonien See) alternatively Paludina Lake, was an ancient fresh-water lake that developed from the middle Pliocene to the early Pleistocene in the southern part of the Pannonian Basin at the time of final retraction of the Pannonian Sea. The lake was located in the area of modern-day Vojvodina in northern Serbia and eastern Slavonia in Croatia.

In the Pliocene, favourable climatic and geodynamic conditions in southeastern Europe led to the development of extensive, long-lasting lakes like Lake Slavonia. These lakes saw a rapid diversification of viviparid snails during the warming period reaching its peak between 3.3 and 2.9 million years ago when temperatures rose by as much as 10 °C.

M. Neumayr and C. M. Paul, in their 1875 study, used the molluscs from Lake Slavonia to develop a regional biostratigraphy, allowing precise stratigraphic analysis of deposits spanning over 600 km along the southern boundary of the Pannonian Basin. They originally named it Paludina Lake but over time researchers introduced the new name of the lake.

== See also ==
- Pannonian Basin
- Iron Gates
