= Sveti Jure =

Mountain of the Dinaric Alps in Croatia

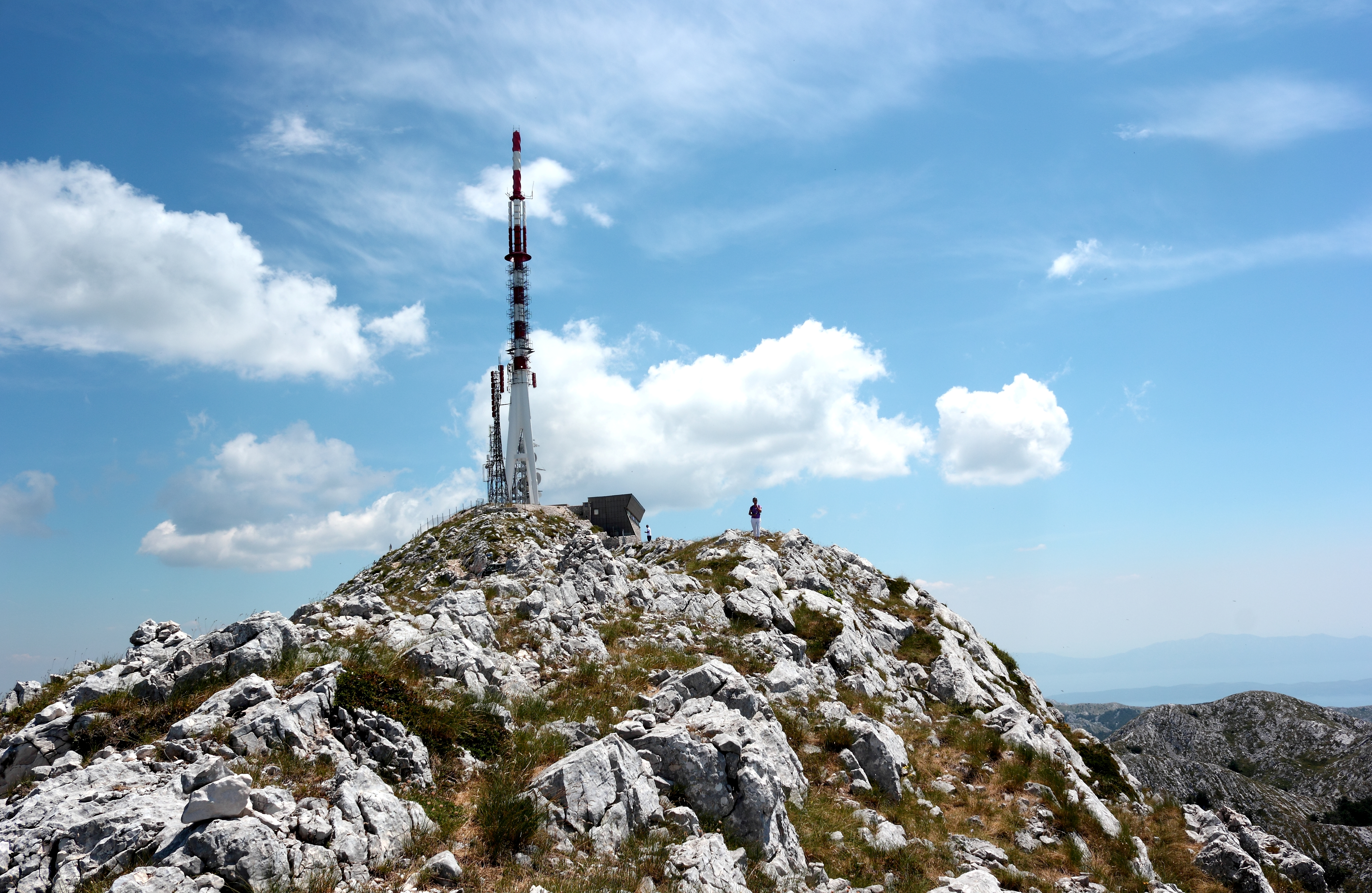

Highest point
- Elevation: 1,762 m (5,781 ft)
- Coordinates: 43°20′32.2″N 17°3′12.6″E

Geography
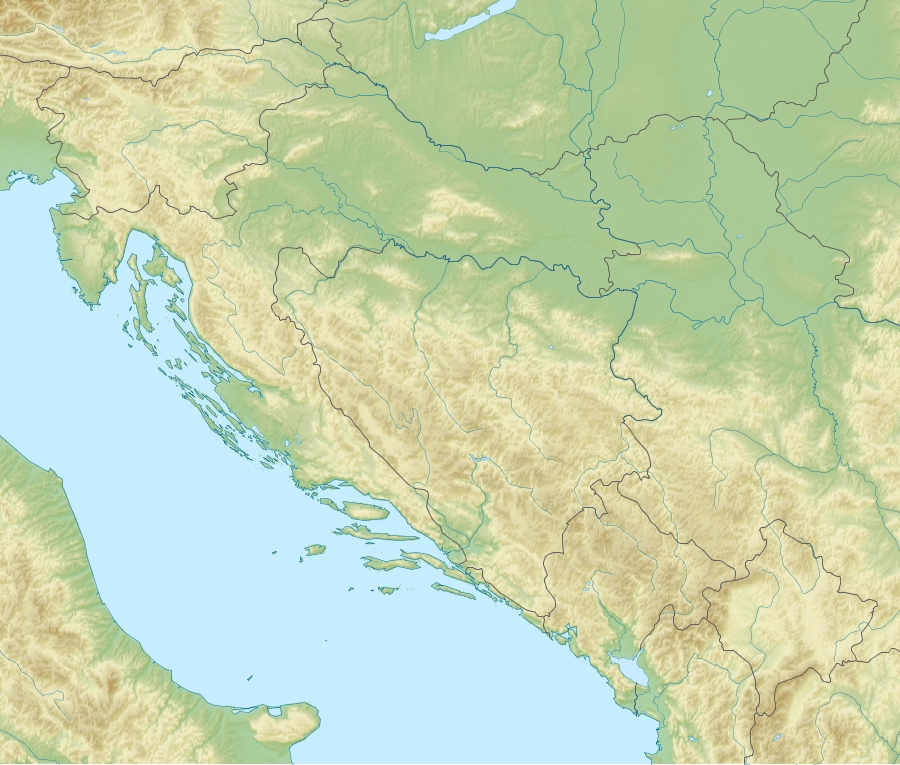
- Location within Dinaric Alps
- Country: Croatia
- Region: Split-Dalmatia County
- Parent range: Dinaric Alps

Sveti Jure (English: Saint George) is a mountain in Croatia near the town of Makarska that is part of the Dinaric Alps. At 1,762 m.a.s.l., it is the highest point in the Biokovo mountain range and one of the highest peaks of Croatia.

== History ==
Sveti Jure is named after the Christian martyr Saint George, who has a chapel dedicated to him 50 metres below the mountain's summit. The chapel is the highest church in Croatia; it was likely built or renovated in the 13th century, and its existence was first recorded in 1640. The chapel holds Mass annually on the last Saturday of July, rather than the traditional celebration of Saint George's Day on April 23, due to frequent bad weather in April.

The summit of Sveti Jure is accessible via the Biokovo Road, the highest road in Croatia. The road was extended in the mid-1960s to facilitate the construction of a television tower at the mountain's summit by Television Zagreb, and was paved in 1979. The original stone chapel was demolished in 1965 as part of the construction, and was rebuilt in 1968 in concrete with a stone covering.

Sveti Jure was originally included as part of the 2017 Tour of Croatia cycling race, but was removed due to inclement weather. The mountain was readded the following year to the 2018 Tour of Croatia, serving as the summit finish of the race's third stage.

== Geography and climbing ==
Sveti Jure is the highest peak of Biokovo, a karst mountain range along Croatia's Adriatic Sea coast. The Croatian Mountaineering Association refers to Sveti Jure as either the second-highest or the third-highest peak in Croatia. (Note: Sveti Jure is the second-highest Croatian peak after Dinara (1,831 m.a.s.l.), and the third-highest when including Žrvanj (1,768 m.a.s.l.), a subsidiary peak southwest of Jančiji (1,790 m.a.s.l.). While Jančiji is located entirely within Bosnia and Herzegovina, Žrvanj is located on the two countries' border; according to the association's criteria, however, Žrvanj would not be considered an independent peak.)

If Sveti Jure's television tower—with a height of roughly 80–90 metres (260–300 ft)—is included in the calculation, the top of this tower becomes the country's highest point at approximately 1,850 m.a.s.l. The mountain's true summit is inside a fence around the tower and not accessible to visitors.

The summit offers views of the nearby town of Makarska, the Makarska Riviera, and Brač and other islands. On clear days, the Apennine Mountains in Italy are visible 252 kilometres (157 mi) away.

Most visitors arrive at the summit of Sveti Jure via car; it can also be reached on bicycle or on foot. From Makarska, the journey to the summit lasts 31 kilometres (19 mi) along the Biokovo Road. Hikers can approach the summit from multiple starting points: via Milići; via Turija and Ljubović; and via Makarska and the Štropac and Vošac peaks of Biokovo. The "Pod Jurom" mountain hut is located along the Biokovo Road beneath the summit. It was built as part of the television tower's construction and opened to hikers in 1983.

== Climate and ecology ==
The mean annual temperature at the summit of Sveti Jure is 3.9 °C (39.0 °F), making it one of the coldest points of Croatia. The peak has snow for most of the year.

The summit of Sveti Jure is home to several species of lizard, including the Mosor rock lizard, the common wall lizard, and the Dalmatian wall lizard. Plant species in and around the summit include silvery dwarf harebell, rock bell, sandwort, leopard's bane, and martagon lily.

== Gallery ==
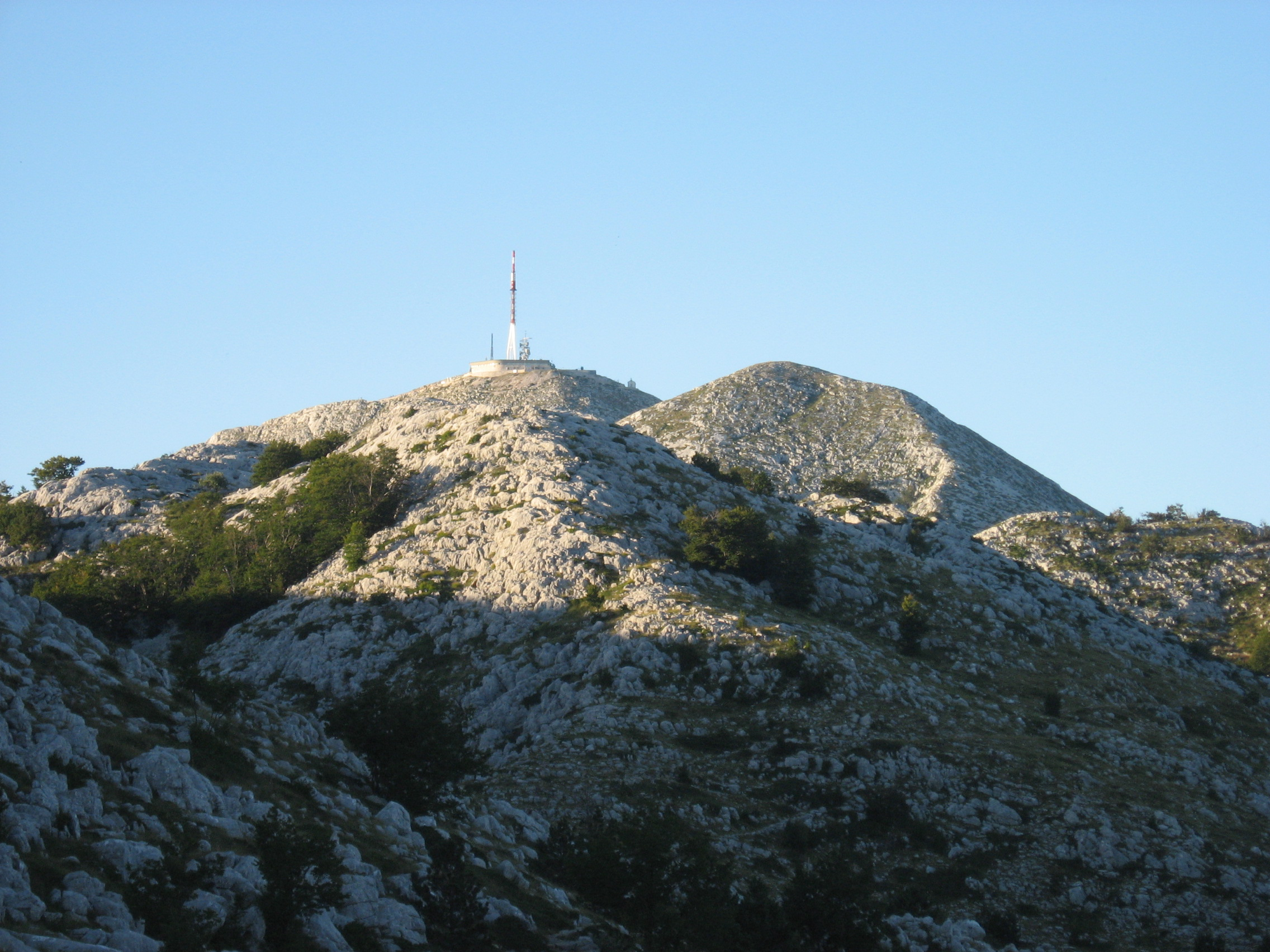
View of Sveti Jure summit

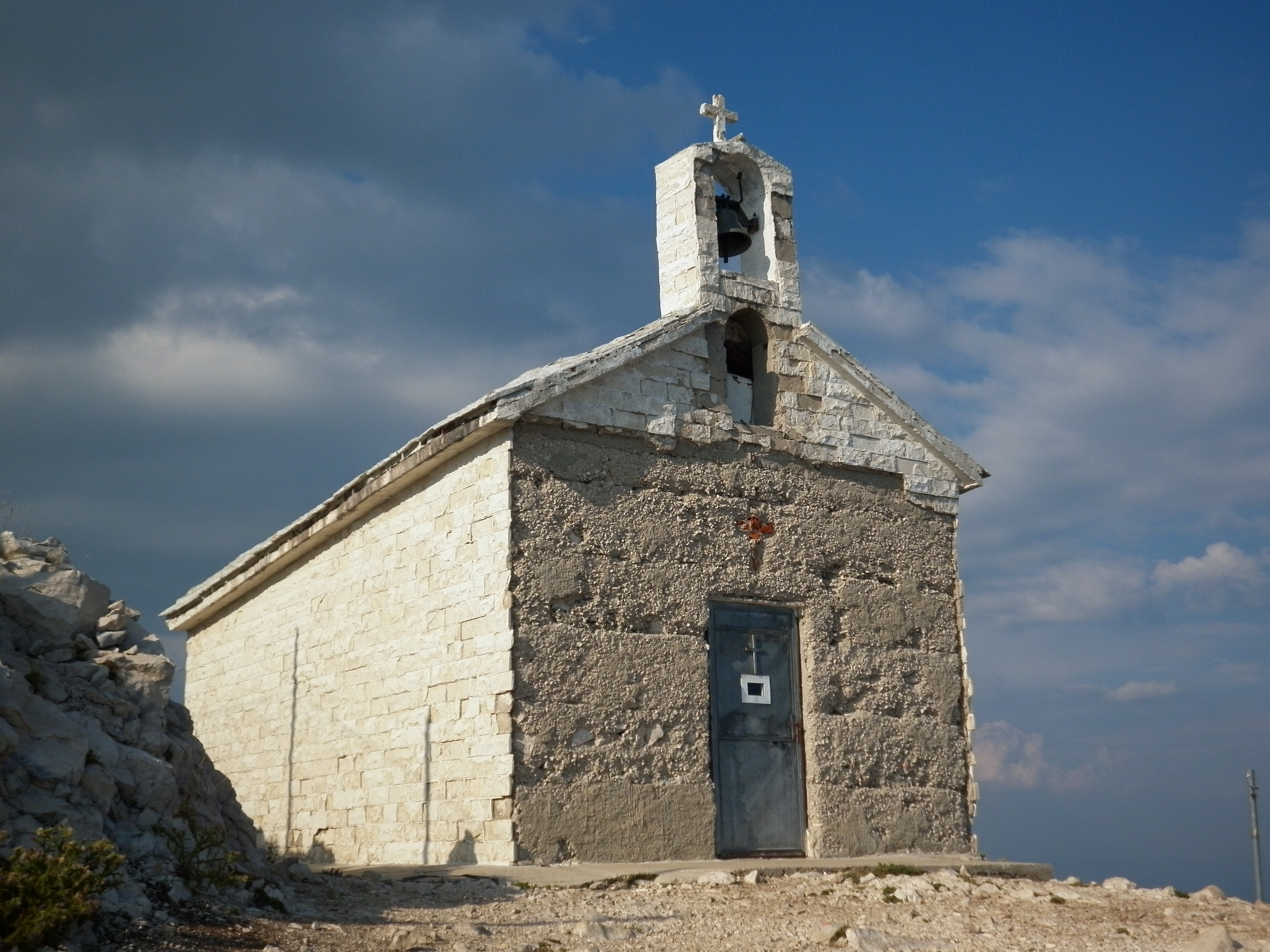
Church of Sveti Jure

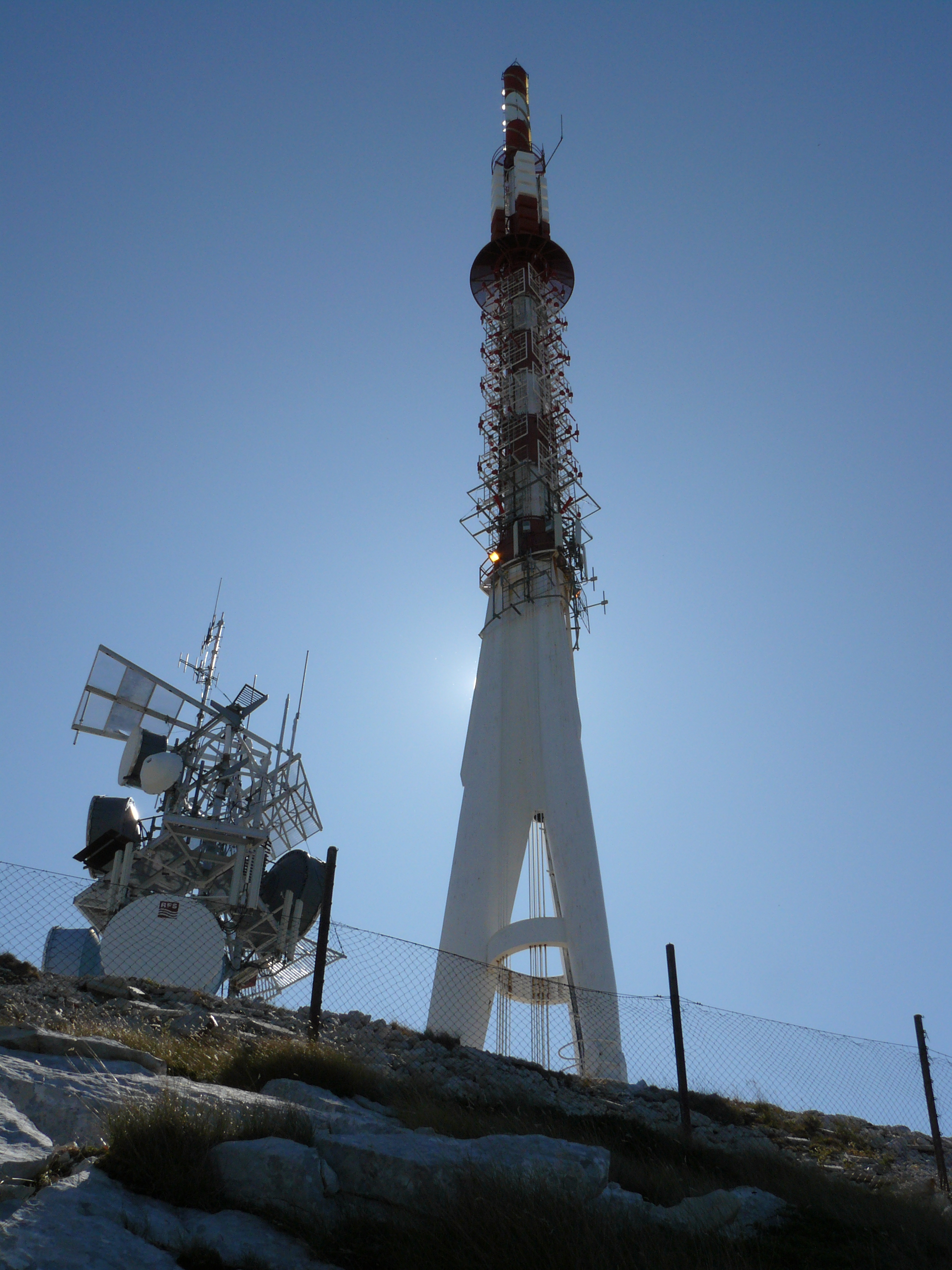
Sveti Jure television tower

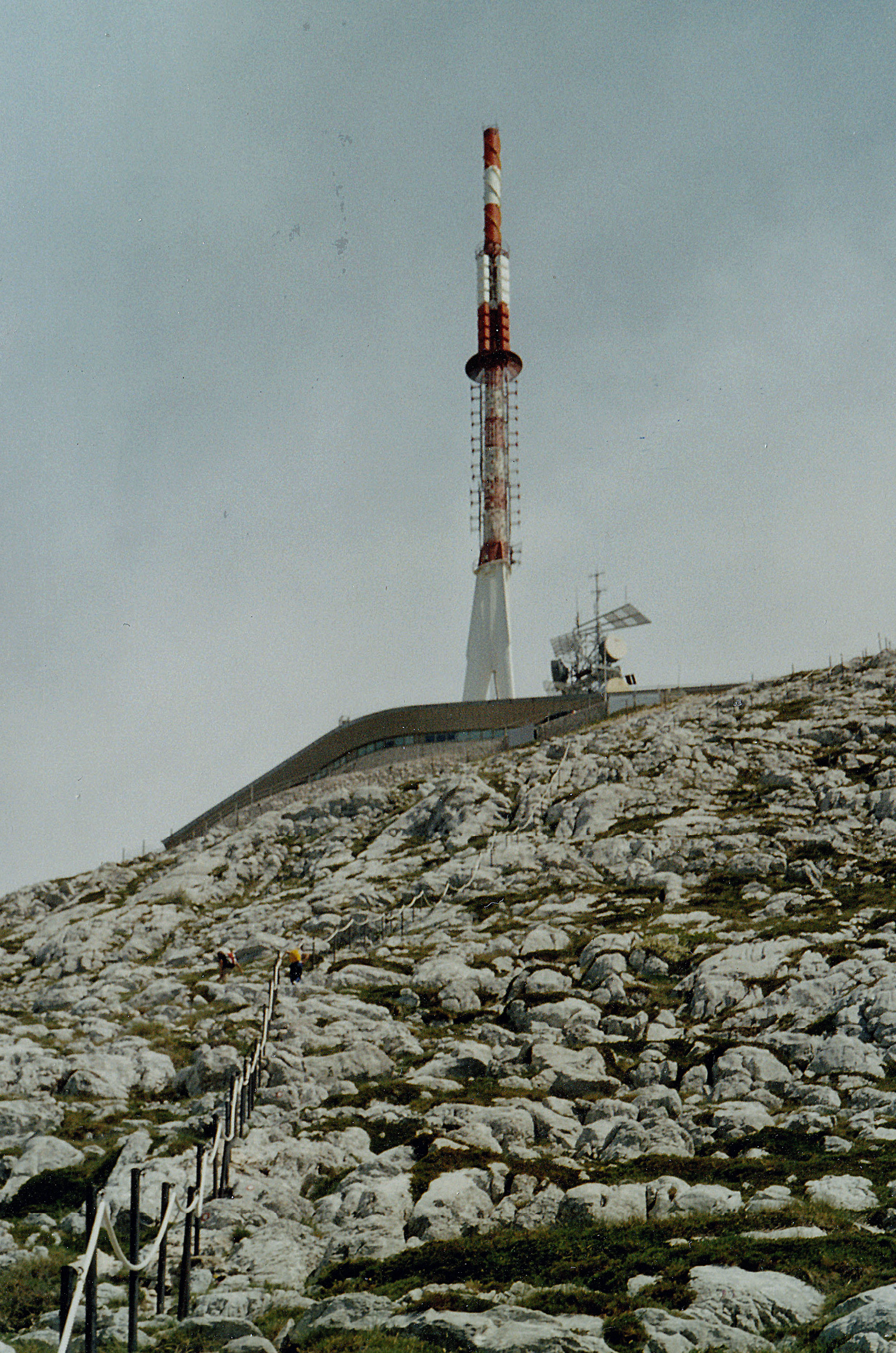
Climbers ascending Sveti Jure

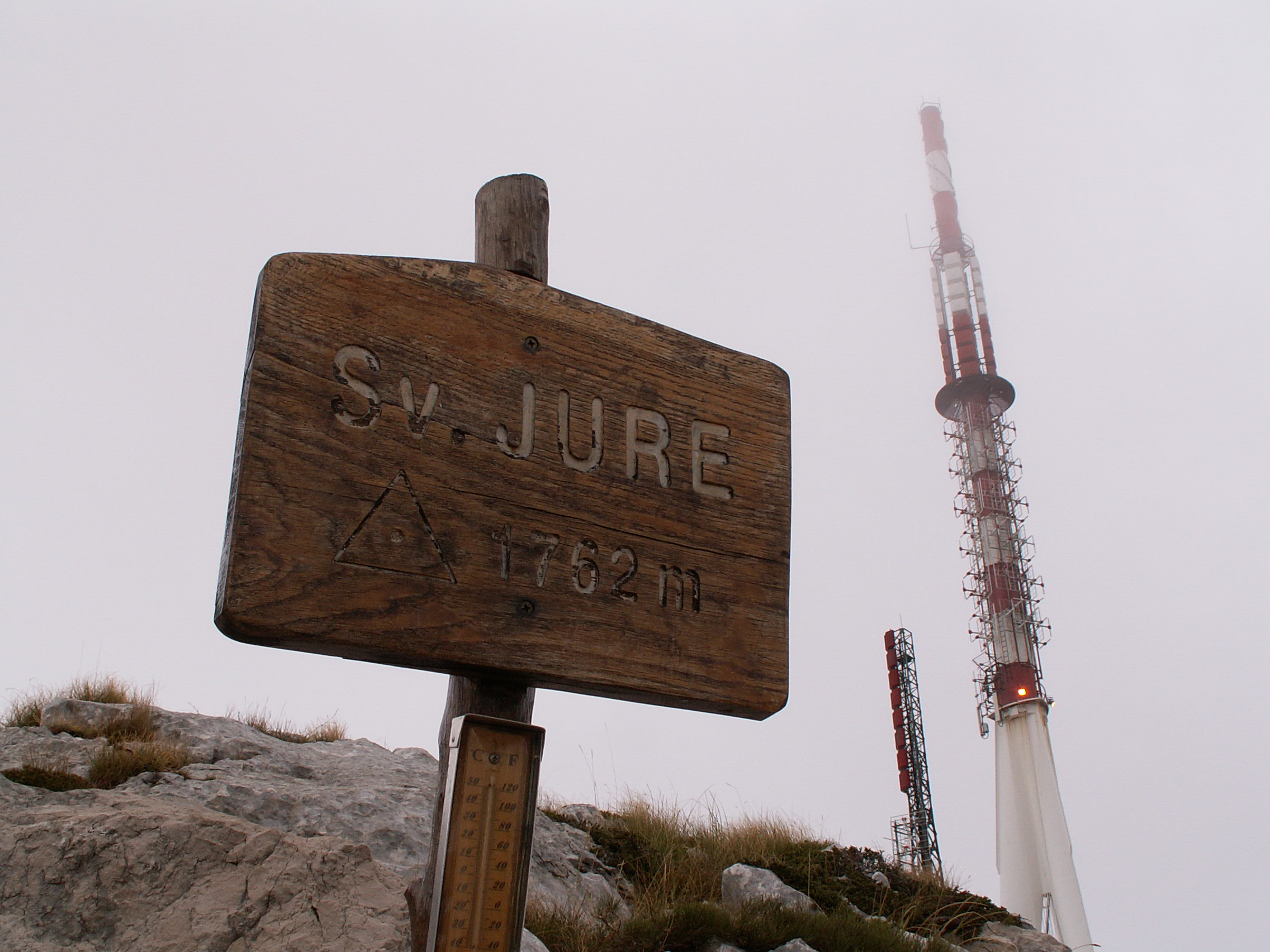
Sveti Jure summit marker

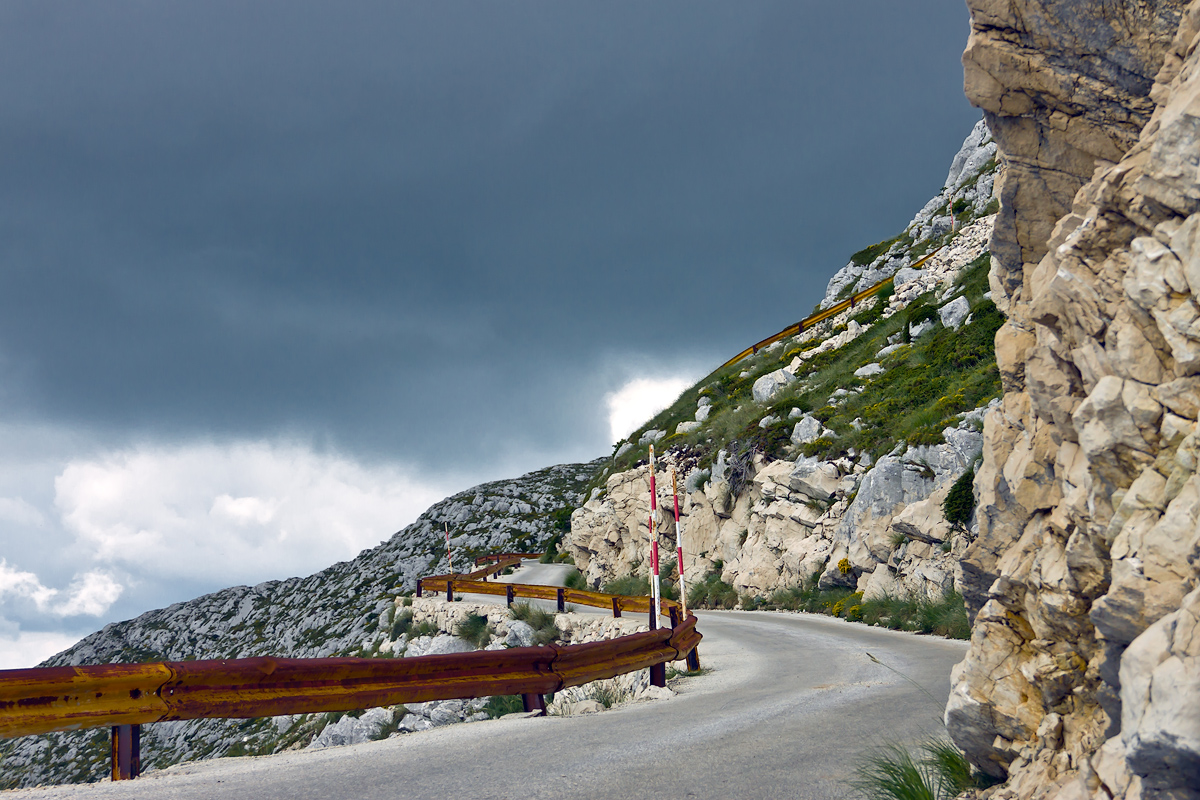
Biokovo Road to Sveti Jure

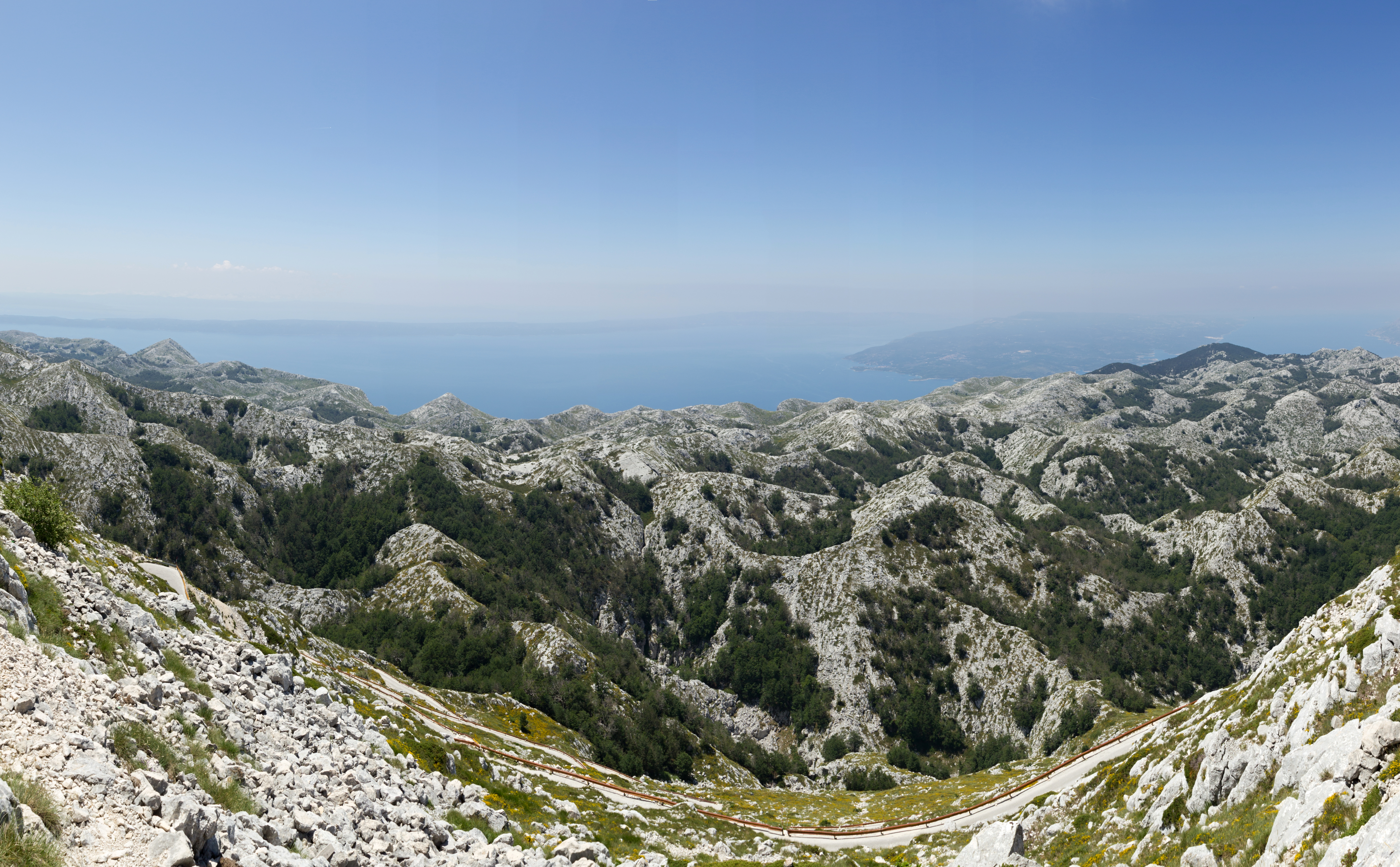
Panoramic view from Sveti Jure summit

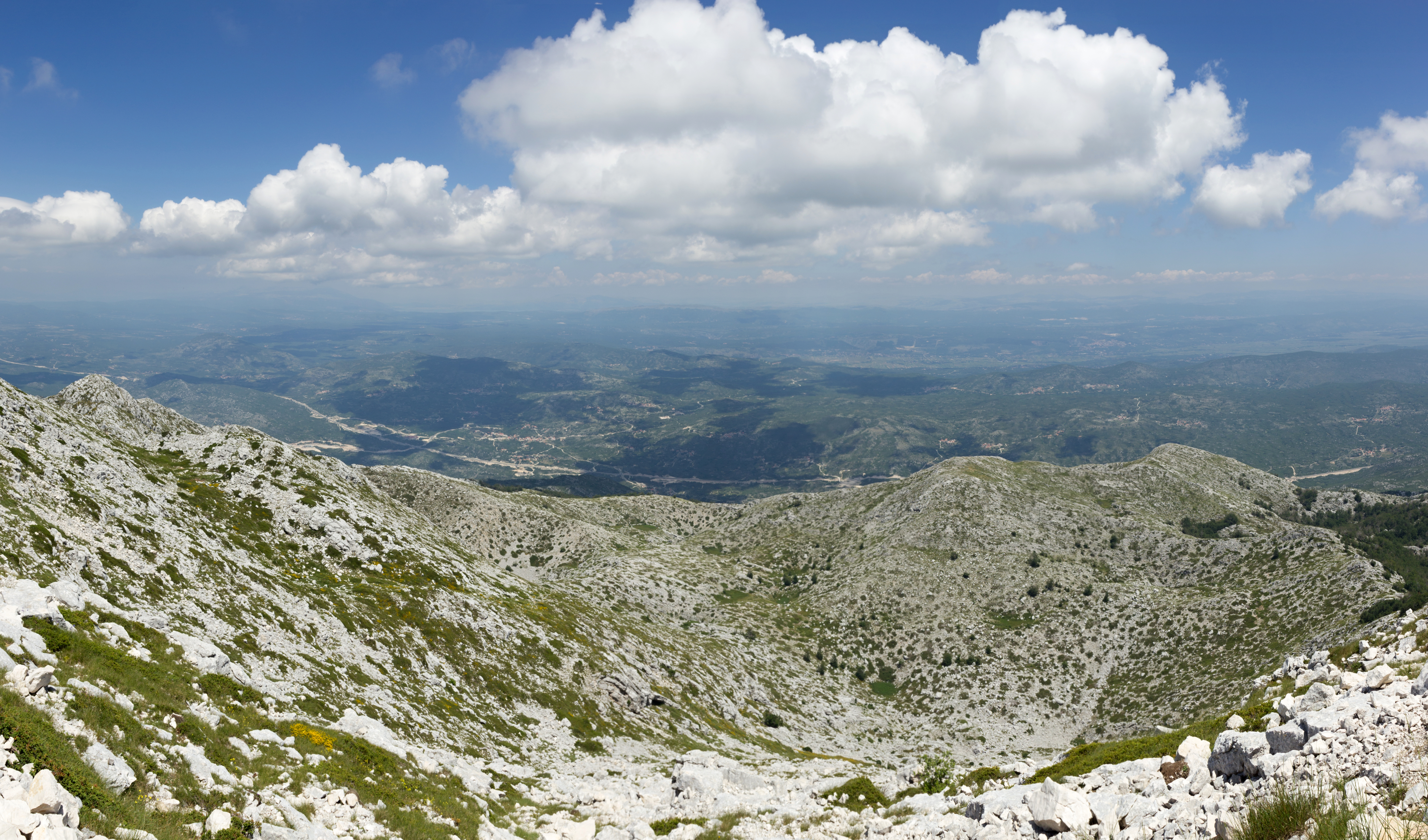
View north from Sveti Jure summit

== See also ==
- Biokovo Nature Park
- List of mountains in Croatia
- Topography of Croatia
