= Vršac Mountains =

Mountain range in Serbia and Romania

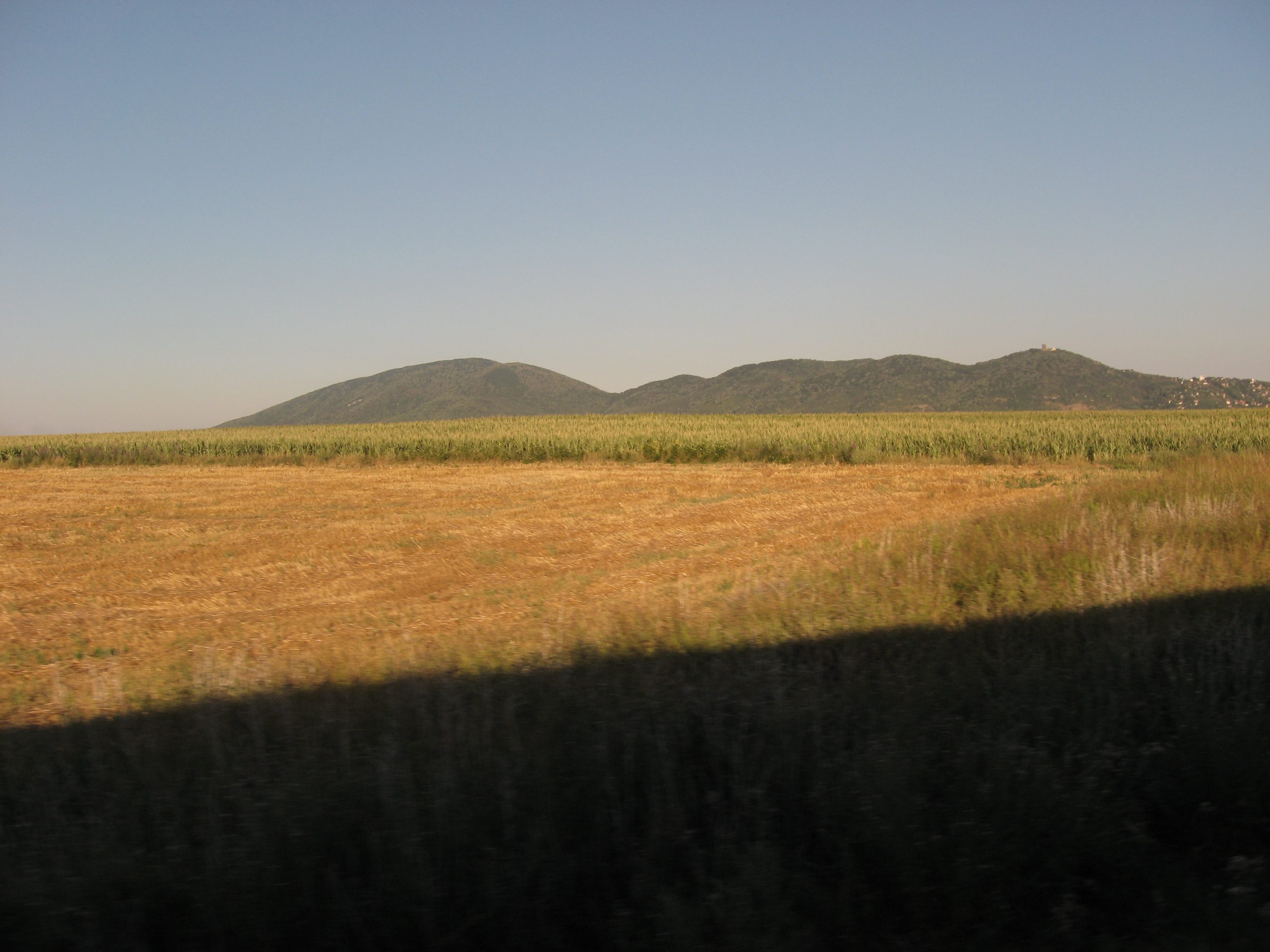

Highest point
- Elevation: 641 m (2,103 ft)
- Coordinates: 45°08′13″N 21°24′44″E

Geography
- Location within Serbia
- Location: Serbia and Romania
- Parent range: Pannonian island mountains

The Vršac Mountains (Serbian: Vršačke planine, Serbian Cyrillic: Вршачке планине, Romanian: Munții Vârșeț), also known as Vršac Hill (Serbian: Vršački breg, Serbian Cyrillic: Вршачки брег, Romanian: Dealurile Vârșețului), are located in the northern Serbia, near the town of Vršac, and partially also in Romania. They represent an independent and distinct massif, 19 kilometres (12 mi) long and spreading across an area of 170 km^{2} (66 mi^{2}), of which 122 km^{2} (47 mi^{2}) belong to Serbia and 48 km^{2} (19 mi^{2}) to Romania.

== Geography ==
The Vršac Mountains have a shape of an arch, where the basic mountain mass takes the central position, while the hills extend to the south and north. The mountains are built of Paleozoic rocks (which date back over 260 million years) which are surrounded by Neogene sediments (about 60 mya), including those of the ancient Pannonian sea (about 25 mya). Contrary to some literature data, the Vršac Mountains are not part of the Carpathians but are a Pannonian island mountain according to their geotectonic position and geological structure. Specific forms of geomorphological diversity, naturally sculpted – made of gneiss and schist are represented in solitary or clustered hummocks.

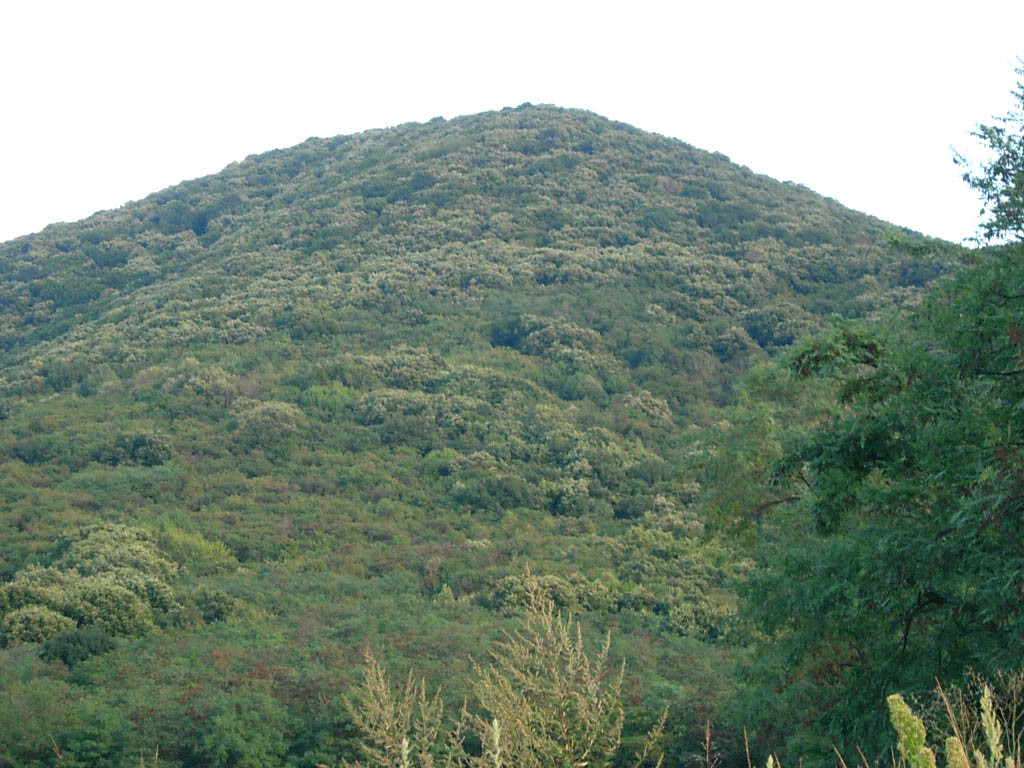
Gudurica Peak

In respect to the appearance of the Vršac Mountains, four distinct shapes are clearly visible:

- Vršac Tower (Vršačka kula), 399 metres (1,309 ft)
- Gudurica Peak (Gudurički vrh), the highest peak of Vojvodina, with its 641-metre (2,103 ft) altitude
- Fox's Head (Lisičija glava), with its three peaks, where the highest is Vršac Peak (Vršački vrh), 590 metres (1,940 ft)
- Vršišor, 463 metres (1,519 ft)

Between them there are vast rifts. Turska glava (402 m), Đakov vrh (449 m), and Kamenarica are also interesting places for climbers.

== Wildlife ==
Owing to the exceptional natural conditions, the Vršac mountains with 120 registered species of birds are one of the richest ornithological habitats in Vojvodina and the whole Serbia. It is necessary to mention some other representatives of the fauna, like grey and red fox, deer, wild boars and wolves that appear from time to time.

Vršac Mountains have been classified since 1982 as a "landscape of outstanding features" in the Serbian Registry of Protected Natural Resources.

== Culture ==
The most important cultural monuments include Vršac Castle from the 15th century and Mesić Monastery, which according to the documents from 18th century was built in the 15th century, while tradition claim that it was erected in 1225.

== See also ==
- List of mountains in Serbia
