= Papuk =

Mountain in Croatia

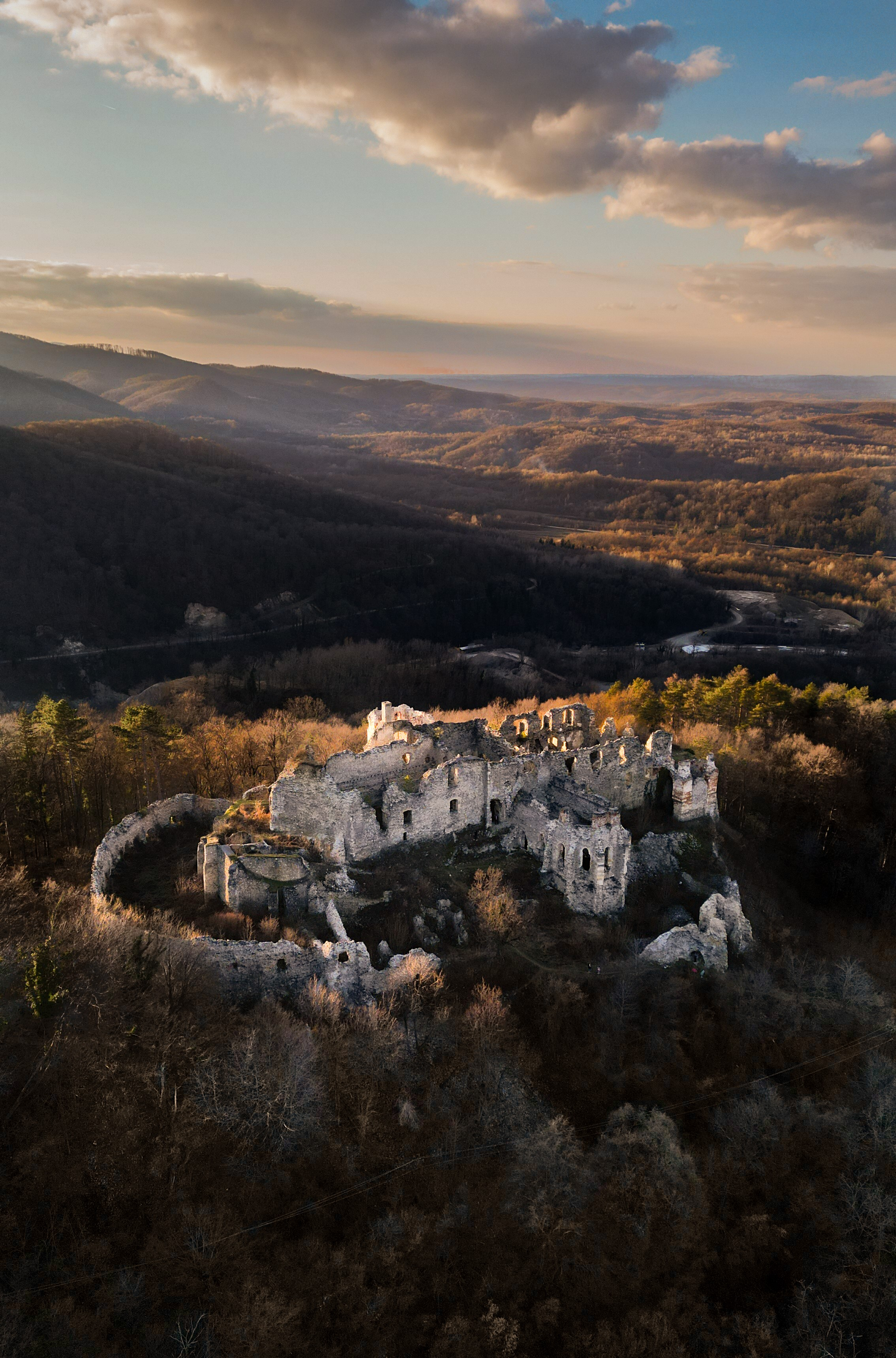
- The view of Ružica grad and Papuk mountain

Highest point
- Elevation: 953 m (3,127 ft)
- Listing: List of mountains in Croatia
- Coordinates: 45°32′N 17°39′E

Geography
- Location within Croatia
- Location: Slavonia, Croatia

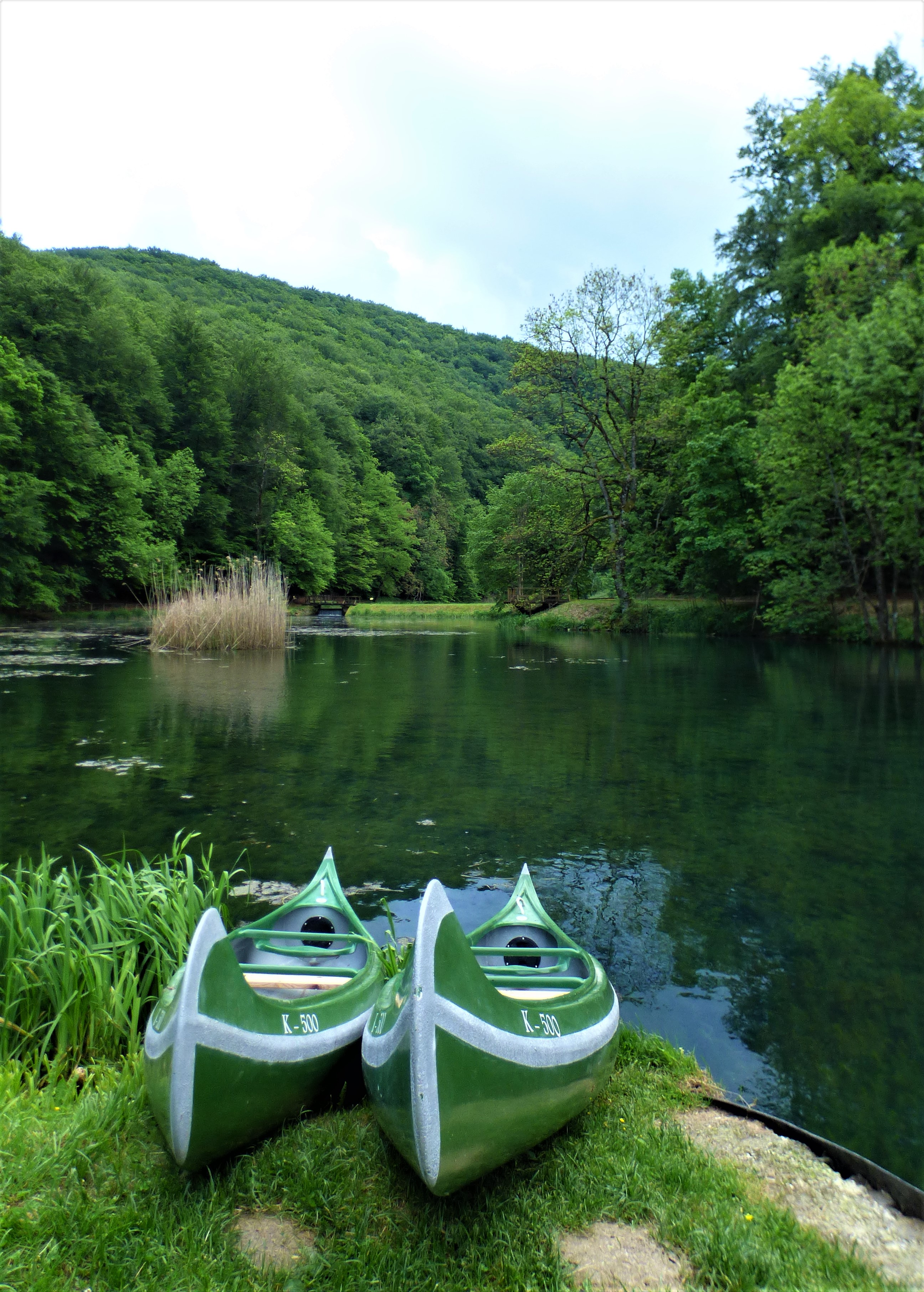
Lake in Papuk Nature Park

Papuk is the largest mountain in the Slavonia region in eastern Croatia, near the city of Požega. It extends between Bilogora to the northwest, Krndija to the east, and Ravna gora and Psunj to the southwest.

The highest peak is the eponymous peak at 953 m.a.A.

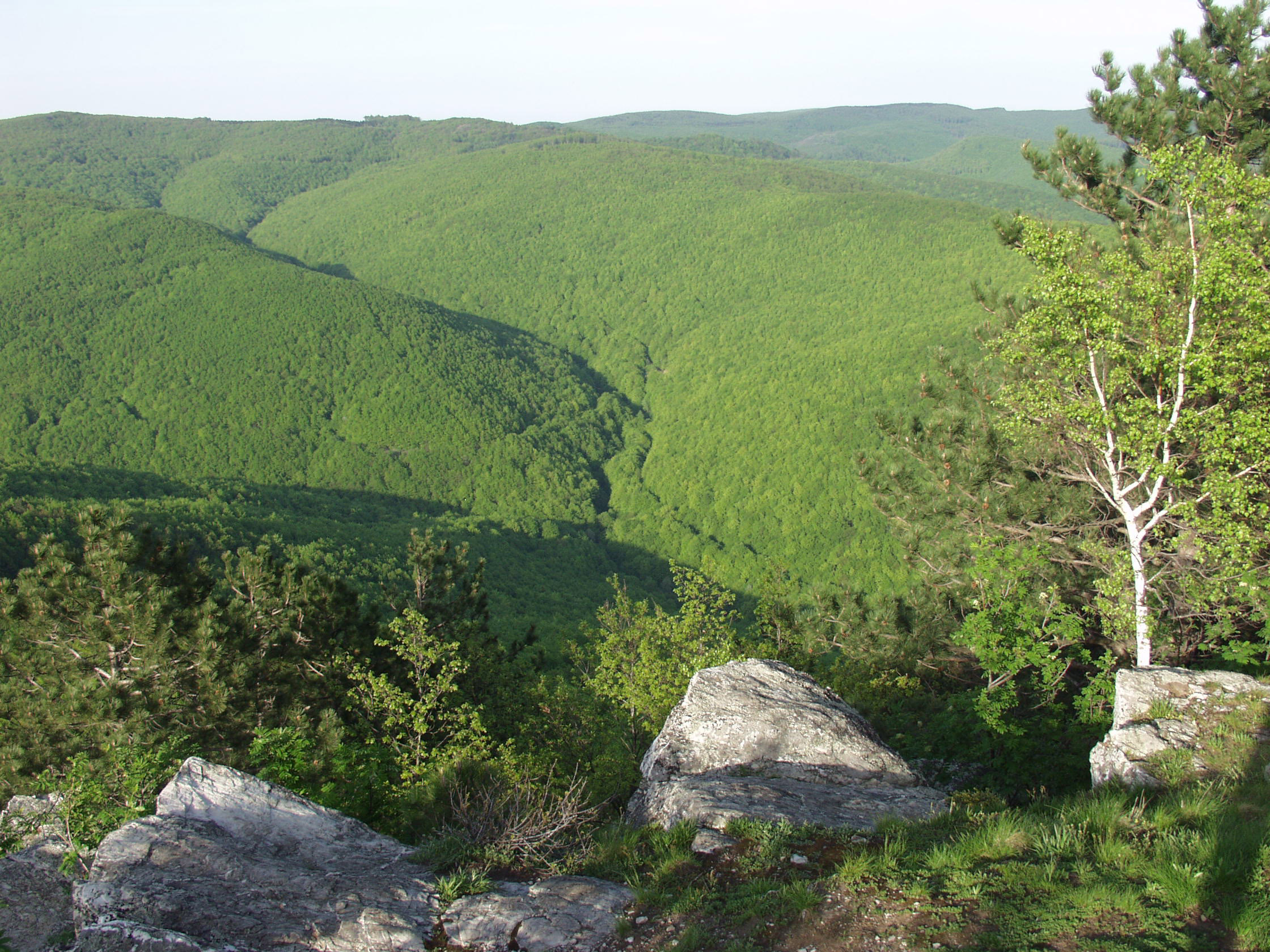
Papuk mountain

The area of Papuk is designated a nature park (park prirode), a kind of protected area in Croatia.

At the seventh European Geopark Network Open Conference, hosted by North West Highlands Geopark in September 2007, the Papuk Geopark became the first Croatian Geopark and 30th member of the European and UNESCO Global Geoparks Network.

Geopark Papuk was awarded licence second time from UNESCO in 2011.

== Name ==
There are several supposed etymologies of the name "Papuk", it's almost certainly not of Croatian origin. One is that it comes by assimilation from earlier "Bapuk", where "Ba" is the name of the Celtic tribe that inhabited the region, and "Puk" comes from the Indo-European root *peiH, meaning "big". However, from the historical sources, it's visible that Papuk was originally a hydronym. Based on that, it's been suggested that the name comes from the repetitive of the Indo-European root *bhogj (to flow), *bhebhogj, so that it means "that which flows and flows". However, there are several problems with that etymology. First, it's visible by hydronyms such as "Bosut" and "Bosna" that Indo-European *bh gave *b in the local language. Second, *bhebhogj would actually mean "flow and flow" and not "that which flows and flows", so the endings don't match. So, it's been suggested that the name is of Pre-Indo-European origin.

== Papuk Geopark ==
The Papuk Geopark (45°32′N 17°39′E) is a geopark in Croatia which is situated in two counties, Požega-Slavonia and Virovitica-Podravina, and includes upland forests of the Papuk and Krndija mountains, and edges of agricultural fields. The total area of the Geopark is 33,600 hectares (83,000 acres). In September 2007, the Papuk Geopark became the first Croatian geopark (an area with an expressed geological heritage and a strategy for a sustainable economical development) and the 30th member of the European Geoparks Network and a member of the UNESCO-assisted Global Geoparks Network.

The Papuk mountains belong to the Slavonia highlands which are in Pannonia, a low-lying area of Slavonia. Even though, the Slavonia highlands are not higher than 1,000 meters, their presence is very noticeable in the landscape. This is because the surrounding alluvial fields are at around 100 m height above sea level, while the hillsides are only 100 m above the fields. The highlands are mostly covered with forests, which differentiates them from the surrounding landscape.

Within the Slavonia highlands, the Papuk Mountain stretches from west to east. From the main mountain-ridge well intended are two spurs and a tract watered by a drainage basin in the direction north south. As a remarkable point, emphasis lies on peaks Točak (887 m), Papuk (953 m), Ivačka glava (913 m), Češljakovački vis (820 m), and Kapovac (792 m), which are spread out continuously, and act as a drainage divide between the numerous tributary streams flowing to the river Drava to the north, and the river Sava to the south.

== Mountain huts ==
In the 1935–1936 season, the mountain hut on Vražje Vršće, at 240 metres (790 ft) in elevation, saw 1135 visitors, including 50 Italian, 41 Austrian, 26 Czechoslovak, 26 German, 22 Russian and 4 French citizens. Only Aleksandrov dom on Vošac (Biokovo) boasted of more foreign visitors among the mountain huts owned by the HPS. The logger's hut on Pogani vrh at 639 metres (2,096 ft) saw 736 visitors. In the 1936–1937 season, the mountain hut on Jankovac saw 583 visitors, including 3 German, 2 Austrian, 1 Bulgarian and 1 Czechoslovak citizen; that on Vražje Vršće saw 960 visitors, including 33 Czechoslovak, 32 Russian and 27 German citizens; the logger's hut on Pogani Vrh saw 387 visitors, including 4 Czechoslovak, 1 Austrian and 1 German citizens. In the 1937–1938 season, the mountain hut on Jankovac saw 424 visitors, including 3 Italian, 2 Austrian, 2 German, 1 Czechoslovak and 1 Polish citizens; that on Vražje Vršće saw 724 visitors, including 6 Czechoslovak, 6 Russian, 6 Austrian, 3 German, 3 Italian, 2 Romanian, 2 French and 1 Bulgarian citizens; the logger's hut on Pogani Vrh saw 515 visitors, including 2 Czechoslovak and 1 Austrian citizens. The mountain hut on Petrov vrh was under construction.

== Ravna Gora ==
Ravna Gora
- Location within Croatia

Highest point
- Elevation: 854 m (2,802 ft)
- Listing: List of mountains in Croatia

Geography
- Location: Slavonia, Croatia

Ravna Gora is a mountain in the Slavonia region in eastern Croatia. It is located between Psunj and Papuk, northeast of Pakrac and southeast of Daruvar. The highest peak is Čučevo at the altitude of 854 metres (2,802 ft). It is bound from the north by the Pakra river, and from the east by river Orljava.

Geographers usually classify Ravna Gora as mountain ridge of the Papuk mountain range. In its western part Papuk mountain range is about 20 km wide, formed by three parallel ridges: Lisina (Crni vrh 863 m), Ljutoč (716 m) and Ravna Gora.

== See also ==
- List of National Geoparks
- Sustainable tourism
- List of protected areas of Croatia

== Bibliography ==
=== Alpinism ===
- Poljak, Željko (February 1959). "Papuk". Kazalo za "Hrvatski planinar" i "Naše planine" 1898—1958 (PDF). Naše planine. Vol. XI. p. 6. ISSN 0354-0650.

=== Meteorology ===
- Počakal, Damir (15 December 2005). "Influence of Orography on Hail Characteristics in the Continental Part of Croatia". Hrvatski meteorološki časopis (40): 641–642. ISSN 1330-0083.
