= Dilj =

Mountain

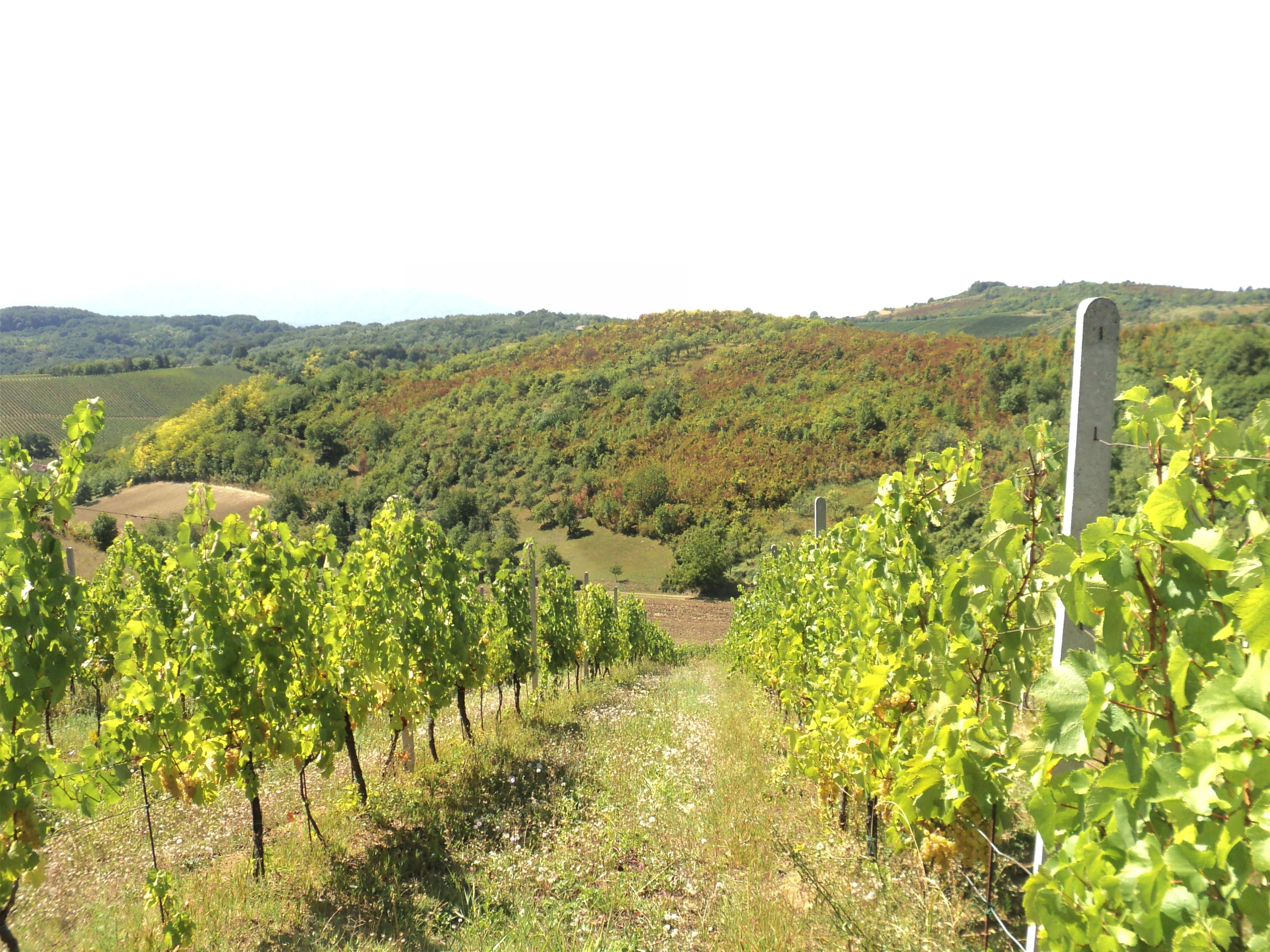
- Vineyards on the slopes of Dilj mountain near Brodski Stupnik

Highest point
- Elevation: 471 m (1,545 ft)
- Coordinates: 45°16′N 18°06′E

Geography
- Location within Croatia
- Location: Croatia

Dilj is a low mountain in south-central Slavonia, located in eastern Croatia. Of all the mountains in Slavonia, Dilj is the lowest-lying, at 471 meters. It is located north of Slavonski Brod and south of Krndija. Dilj mountain contains a forest that spreads in an east–west direction of approximately 50 km, and a north–south direction of approximately 30 km. Forestation of the area includes a variety of plants, including Pannonian-Balkan forest oak. Areas not covered in forestation are mainly cultivated with Orchards, Vineyards and Dehesas.

== Mountain huts ==
In the 1935–1936 season, the Torbarevo sklonište mountain hut, at 423 metres (1,388 ft) in elevation, saw 127 visitors. In the 1936–1937 season, it was closed. In the 1937–1938 season, it was open.

== Bibliography ==
=== Alpinism ===
- Poljak, Željko (February 1959). "Dilj-gora". Kazalo za "Hrvatski planinar" i "Naše planine" 1898—1958 (PDF). Naše planine. Vol. XI. pp. 6–7. ISSN 0354-0650.

=== Meteorology ===
- Počakal, Damir (2005-12-15). "Influence of Orography on Hail Characteristics in the Continental Part of Croatia". Hrvatski meteorološki časopis (40): 641–642. ISSN 1330-0083.
