= Psunj =

Mountain in eastern Croatia

- Location within Croatia

Highest point
- Elevation: 984 m (3,228 ft)
- Listing: List of mountains in Croatia
- Coordinates: 45°23′03″N 17°20′06″E

Geography
- Location: Slavonia, Croatia

Psunj is a mountain in the southwestern Slavonia region in eastern Croatia. It is the highest mountain of Slavonia, with the highest peak of Brezovo polje at 984 m.a.s.l. In the north it extends to Ravna gora and Papuk, while otherwise it is surrounded by lowlands. It is located north of Nova Gradiška and southeast of Pakrac.

On Psunj, there is a 128.5-metre-tall (422 ft) lattice tower used for FM and TV transmission, which was designed by Prof. Marjan Ivancic and built by Mostogradnja in 1962/1963. Originally this tower was completely free-standing. Today it is additionally guyed at its upper section.

Psunj was called "Pisunus" in antiquity. There are several suggested etymologies for that. One is that it comes from the Indo-European root *pekj (cattle). The other is that it comes from the Indo-European roots *peiH (big, in the sense "mountain") and *sen (old). One very similar to that is that it comes from *peiH and *sewn (black). The other is that it's related to the Latin word "pinus", meaning "pine tree" or "resin", itself without a widely accepted etymology.

== Mountain huts ==
In 1937 season, the mountain hut Dom Josipa Svobode was under construction. In the 1937–1938 season it saw 236 visitors, including 1 Austrian citizen.

== Bibliography ==
=== Alpinism ===
- Poljak, Željko (February 1959). "Psunj". Kazalo za "Hrvatski planinar" i "Naše planine" 1898—1958 (PDF). Naše planine. Vol. XI. p. 6. ISSN 0354-0650.

=== Biology ===
- Šašić, Martina; Nahirnić, Ana; Tarmann, Gerhard M. (2016-12-31). "Zygaenidae (Lepidoptera) in the Lepidoptera collections of the Croatian Natural History Museum". Natura Croatica: Periodicum Musei Historiae Naturalis Croatici. 25 (2): 233–248. doi:10.20302/NC.2016.25.19. eISSN 1848-7386.

=== Meteorology ===
- Počakal, Damir (2005-12-15). "Influence of Orography on Hail Characteristics in the Continental Part of Croatia". Hrvatski meteorološki časopis (40): 641–642. ISSN 1330-0083.
