= Krndija =

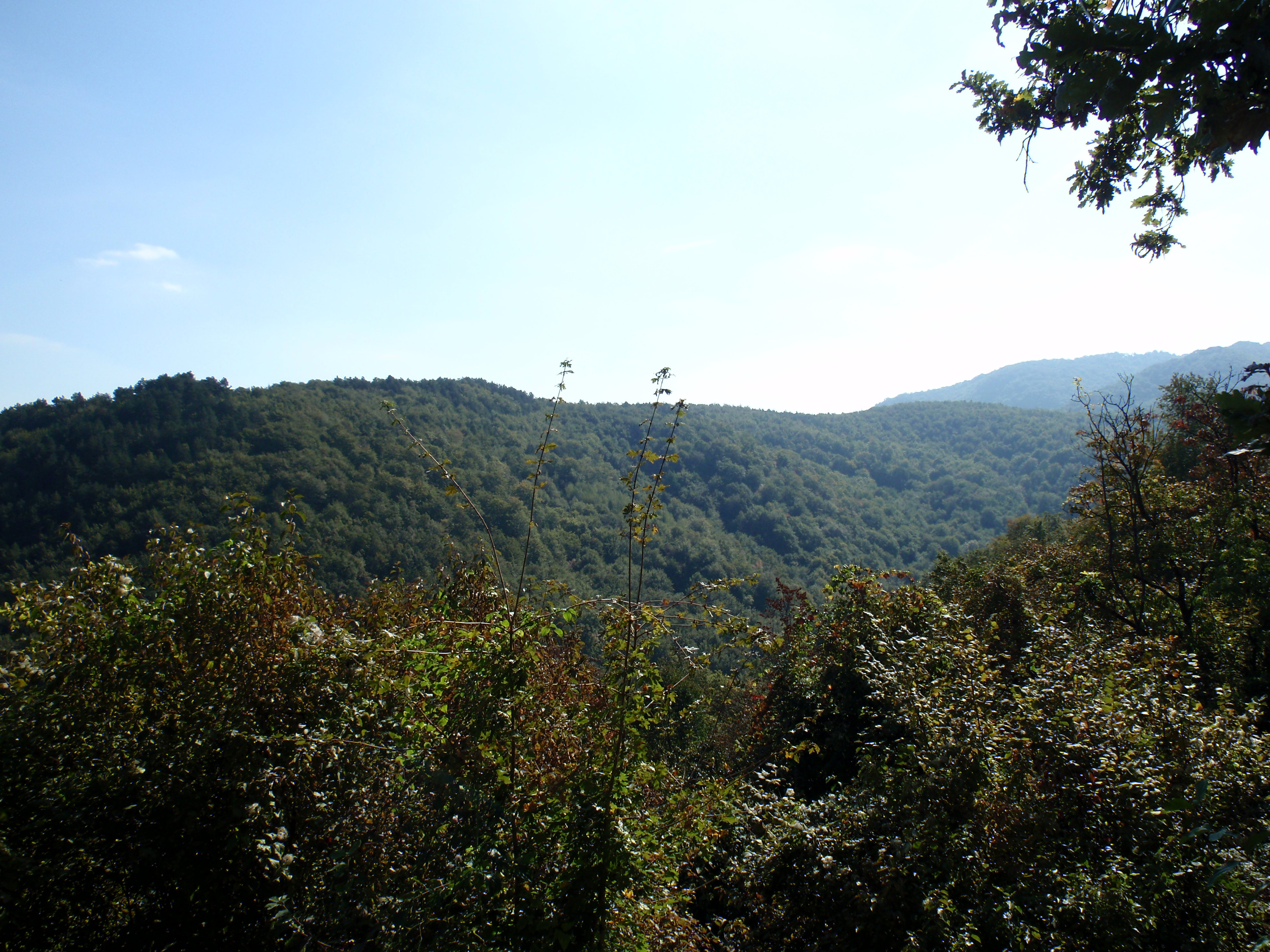

Highest point
- Elevation: 792 m (2,598 ft)
- Coordinates: 45°27′N 17°55′E

Geography
- Location within Croatia
- Location: Croatia

Krndija is a mountain in Slavonia, Croatia, extending eastwards from Papuk. It is located south of Orahovica and Našice and north of Požega.

The westernmost point of Krndija is the mountain pass that connects Orahovica with Kutjevo; the easternmost point is hard to determine, as it gradually passes into the lowland area near Đakovo and further east near Vinkovci.

The highest peak Kapovac is located in the western part of Krndija, at 792 metres (2,598 ft). The peak of the central part of Krndija is at 263 meters of altitude.

There are several theories about the origins of the name "Krndija". It's almost certainly not of Croatian origin. One is that it is related to the Greek word χορδή (itself without a widely accepted etymology), in the sense "the border between the two territories." One is that it comes from the Indo-European root *(s)ker, meaning "to cut", in the sense "where you cut the trees." Perhaps the most likely one is that it comes from the Indo-European root *(s)kwer, meaning "steep". If so, the same root is seen in Scardona (the ancient name for Skradin) and Cersia (the ancient name for Cres).

== Mountain huts ==
In the 1935–1936 season, the Antunovac mountain shelter, at 361 metres (1,184 ft) in elevation, saw only 2 visitors. In the 1937–1938 season it saw 4 visitors.

== Bibliography ==
=== Alpinism ===
- Poljak, Željko (February 1959). "Krndija". Kazalo za "Hrvatski planinar" i "Naše planine" 1898—1958 (PDF). Naše planine. Vol. XI. p. 6. ISSN 0354-0650.

=== Meteorology ===
- Počakal, Damir (2005-12-15). "Influence of Orography on Hail Characteristics in the Continental Part of Croatia". Hrvatski meteorološki časopis (40): 641–642. ISSN 1330-0083.
