= D51 road =

Road in Croatia

D51 state road

Route information
- Length: 50.3 km (31.3 mi)

Major junctions
- From: D53 near Gradište
- D38 in Požega; D38 in Brestovac
- To: A3 in Nova Gradiška interchange

Location
- Country: Croatia
- Counties: Požega-Slavonia, Brod-Posavina
- Major cities: Požega, Nova Gradiška

Highway system
- Highways in Croatia

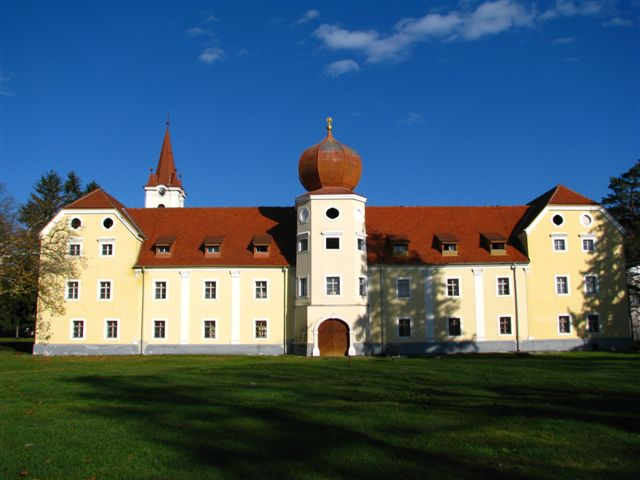
Kutjevo, in the immediate vicinity of D51

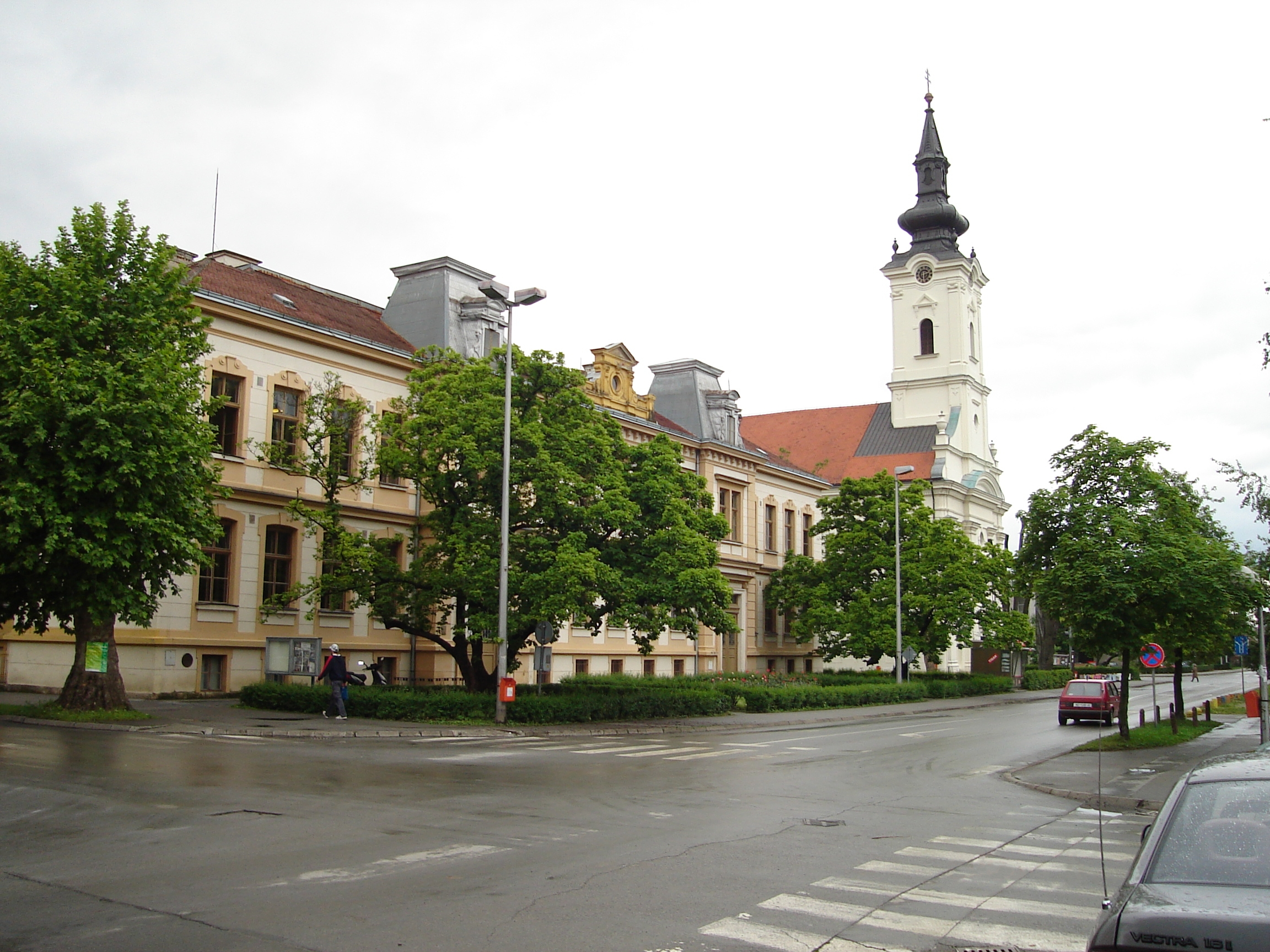
Nova Gradiška, in the immediate vicinity of D51

D51 connects the A3 motorway Nova Gradiška interchange to Nova Gradiška and Požega. The road forms two junctions to D38 state road, one in Brestovac, where D38 branches off to Pakrac, and another 5 km (3.1 mi) further east, in Požega, where D38 branches off to Pleternica. Between those two junctions D51 and D38 are concurrent. The eastern terminus of the road is near Gradište, at a junction to D53 state road to Našice (to the north) and Slavonski Brod (to the south). The road is 50.3 km (31.3 mi) long.

The route comprises numerous junctions to county and local roads, as well as a significant number of urban intersections, in segment of the road running through Požega.

The road, as well as all other state roads in Croatia, is managed and maintained by Hrvatske ceste, a state-owned company.

The D51 state road currently serves as the principal connection to the city of Požega and the A3 motorway, however there are plans to replace it with a new expressway, that is expected to comprise a significantly altered route.

== Traffic volume ==
Traffic is regularly counted and reported by Hrvatske ceste, operator of the road.

D51 traffic volume
Road	Counting site	AADT	ASDT	Notes
D51	3502 Bektež	1,473	1,739	Near the eastern terminus of the road.
D51	3403 Gajevi	1,798	1,897	Adjacent to the Ž4126 junction.

== Road junctions and populated areas ==
D51 junctions/populated areas
Type	Slip roads/Notes
	D53 to Našice (to the north) and Slavonski Brod (to the south). The eastern terminus of the road.
	Bektež
	Kula
	Ž4030 to Kutjevo and Pleternica.
	Cerovac
	Rajsavac
	Radnovac
	Jakšić; Ž4116 to Vetovo and Kuzmica
	Eminovci
	Požega; D38 to Pleternica. D51 and D38 to the west are concurrent. Ž4253 to Velika.
	Završje
	Nurkovac
	Brestovac; D38 to Pakrac. D51 and D38 to the east are concurrent.
	Zakorenje
	Gornji Gučani
	Busnovi
	Ivandol
	Oblakovac
	Banićevac
	Ž4126 to Podvrško and Opatovac.
	Baćin Dol
	Ž4141 to Cernik.
	Rešetari; Ž4158 to Nova Gradiška and Staro Petrovo Selo.
	D313 to Nova Gradiška via Svačićeva street.
	A3 in Nova Gradiška interchange, to Zagreb (to the west) and to Slavonski Brod (to the east). The western terminus of the road.
