= D38 road (Croatia) =

Road in Croatia

D38 state road

Route information
- Length: 120.7 km (75.0 mi)

Major junctions
- From: D5 in Pakrac
- D69 in Kamenska; D51 in Brestovac and Požega; D49 in Pleternica; D53 in Ruševo
- To: D7 near Đakovo

Location
- Country: Croatia
- Counties: Požega-Slavonia, Osijek-Baranja
- Major cities: Pakrac, Požega, Pleternica, Đakovo

Highway system
- Highways in Croatia

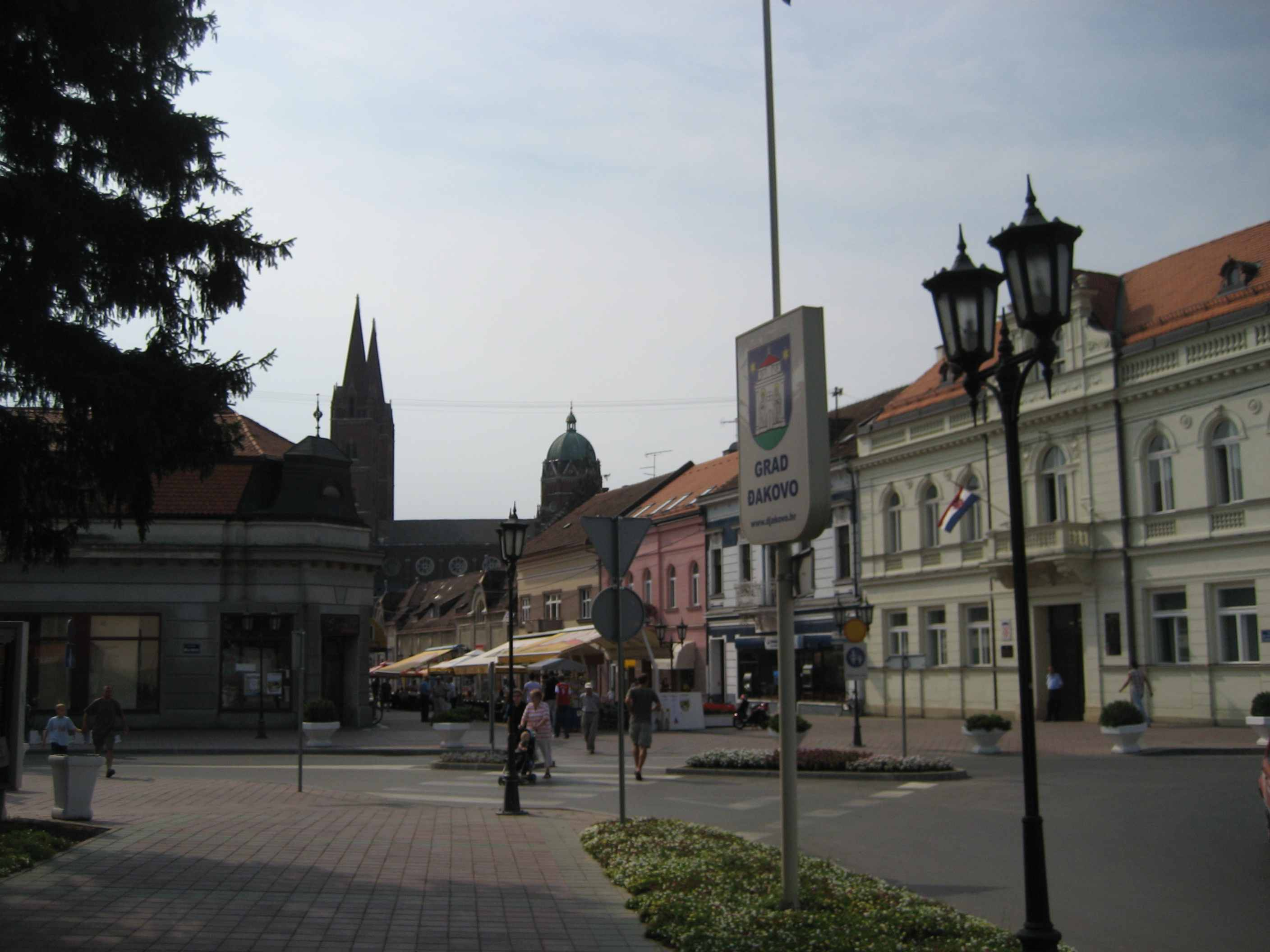
Đakovo, at the eastern terminus of the D38 road

D38 is a state road in the Slavonia region of Croatia that connects the cities of Pakrac, Požega, Pleternica and Đakovo. The road is 120.7 km (75.0 mi) long.

This and all other state roads in Croatia are managed and maintained by Hrvatske Ceste, state owned company.

== Traffic volume ==
Traffic is regularly counted and reported by Hrvatske Ceste, operator of the road.

D38 traffic volume
Road	Counting site	AADT	ASDT	Notes
D38	3401 Pakrac east	907	995	Adjacent to the D5 junction.
D38	3504 Pasikovci	866	931	Adjacent to the Ž4113 junction.
D38	3505 Kuzmica	5,111	5,145	Adjacent to the Ž4116 junction.
D38	3507 Pleternica east	1,196	1,258	Adjacent to the Ž4030 junction.
D38	3605 Levanjska Varoš	738	793	Adjacent to the Ž4144 junction.

== Road junctions ==
D38 junctions
Type	Slip roads/Notes
	Pakrac; D5 to Lipik and Okučani (to the south) and to Daruvar and Virovitica (to the north). Ž4099 to Šeovica. The western terminus of the road.
	Kusonje
	Dragović
	Španovica
	Bučje
	Glavica
	Mijači
	Kamenska; D69 to Zvečevo, Voćin and Slatina (D2).
	Orljavac
	Kujnik
	Pasikovci; Ž4113 to Milivojevci.
	Deževci
	Pavlovci
	Boričevci
	Vilić Selo
	Brestovac; D51 to Nova Gradiška and the A3 motorway Nova Gradiška interchange (to the west). The D38 and D51 roads are concurrent east of Brestovac.
	Nurkovac
	Završje
	Požega; D51 to Jakšić and Gradište (to the east). The D38 and D51 roads are concurrent west of Požega.
	Vidovci
	Dervišaga
	Kuzmica; Ž4116 to Jakšić and Vetovo.
	Srednje Selo
	Viškovci
	Blacko
	Vesela
	Pleternica; D49 to A3 motorway Lužani interchange. Ž4030 to Kutjevo and Orahovica.
	Resnik
	Svilna
	Buk
	Kalinić
	Djedina Rijeka
	D53 to Slavonski Brod (to the south). The D38 and D53 roads are concurrent to the north.
	Ruševo; D53 to Našice (to the north). The D38 and D53 roads are concurrent to the south.
	Paka
	Slobodna Vlast
	Levanjska Varoš; Ž4144 to Breznica Đakovačka.
	Ž4163 to Trnava and Staro Topolje.
	Ž4129 to Kondrić and Satnica Đakovačka (D515).
	Selci Đakovački
	D7 to Osijek (to the north) and Vrpolje (to the south. Ž4147 to Đakovo. Eastbound D38 traffic defaults to Ž4147 and vice versa. Southern terminus of the road.

== See also ==
- A3 motorway
