= Caspar Kórógyi =

Hungarian lord

- Count of Castell
- Born: 1440s
- Died: 1472
- Noble family: House of Kórógyi
- Spouse: Apollonia Rozgonyi (engaged)
- Father: John IV Kórógyi
- Mother: Elizabeth Bánfi de Gara

Caspar Kórógyi, Count of Castell (Hungarian: Kórógyi Gáspár, Croatian: Gašpar Korođski; 1440s–1472) was a Hungarian nobleman and soldier in the middle of the 15th century. He was the last member of the influential Kórógyi family, which became extinct with his death.

== Early life ==
Caspar was born into the Kórógyi family, which possessed lands in southern Transdanubia and northern Slavonia, primarily around the town Osijek. He was the only known child of powerful baron John IV Kórógyi and his third wife, Elizabeth Garai from her family's Bánfi branch. Since his parents married sometime between 1440 and 1443, Caspar was born in the 1440s.

Caspar first appears in contemporary records in 1447, when he was a minor. In March of that year, his father donated his estate Veresegyház in Bács County to his ally John Hunyadi and his sons, Ladislaus and Matthias (the future King of Hungary), also on behalf of his own minor son Caspar. This and later documents indicate that Caspar, as his father's only living son, was designated as his heir. He is next mentioned in 1449 and 1451, during legal procedures with his father's involvements. His name again mentioned in 1453, when John acquired the castles Nevna and Orljavac as a pledge from the Cseh de Léva family. He was still referred to as "a child at a tender age" in January 1454, when John Kórógyi entered into a mutual inheritance contract with his brother-in-law John Perényi, which would come into effect if either of their families became extinct in the male line.

== The last Kórógyi ==
His father died of plague in the autumn of 1456, shortly after his involvement in the victorious defense of Belgrade. Caspar Kórógyi inherited extensive wealth and landholdings. He possessed the permanent family residence, a fortified manor in Osijek, along with several castles – the eponymous ancient seat Korođ (Kórógy), Ivankovo and Nevna (present-day Levanjska Varoš, Croatia) in Valkó County, Baranyavár (present-day Branjin Vrh, Croatia) and Harsány (Szársomlyó) and a portion in Pécsvárad in Baranya County, Cseri in Temes County (laid near present-day Sacoșu Turcesc, Romania), Drenovac in Križevci County and Orljavac in Požega County –, and hundreds of villages that were part of the lordships.

In February 1459, he was among the nobles who took a written oath of allegiance to King Matthias Corvinus, who faced a conspiracy, led by Ladislaus Garai and Nicholas Újlaki, against his rule. In November 1459, Caspar Kórógyi handed over his lands in Bács County to Michael Szilágyi in exchange for the latter's possessed portions in the lordship of Németi (present-day a borough of Szalánta) and other surrounding villages, including Asszonyfalva, Sarvaš, Klisa and Pačetin in Baranya County. Since Paul Herceg de Szekcső, the reigning Ban of Macsó also possessed in several villages there, he pledged his portions in Németi, Kovászd, Mocsár, Sarvaš etc. for 230 golden florins to Kórógyi and his mother Elizabeth in July 1460. If he could not repay the amount, Kórógyi had the right to seize his estates in Szőllős and Kő (present-day Kneževi Vinogradi and Kamenac in Croatia, respectively). Elizabeth remained present in her son's life for many more years. George, the parish priest of Beremend filed a lawsuit against Kórógyi and his mother accusing them of usurping the estate that John Kórógyi had once donated to the parish. In April 1463, King Matthias reprimanded Caspar Kórógyi and ordered him to return the estate. Around the same time, Kórógyi and his mother were jointly involved in a lawsuit regarding the possession right over the estate Odolje (or Odolya; near present-day Ivandol) in Požega County against the Paksi family in 1463–1464. The trial was accompanied by acts of violence on both sides. They were among the local nobles in 1464, who protested against the king's decision that Matthias, disregarding the previous letters of donation, donated the entire lordships of Orljavac and Nevna to Paul Herceg, George Parlagi and Paul Kállai for their merits during the Siege of Jajce. Kórógyi participated in King Matthias' war in Bosnia, which directed against the Turks, in the autumn of 1465.

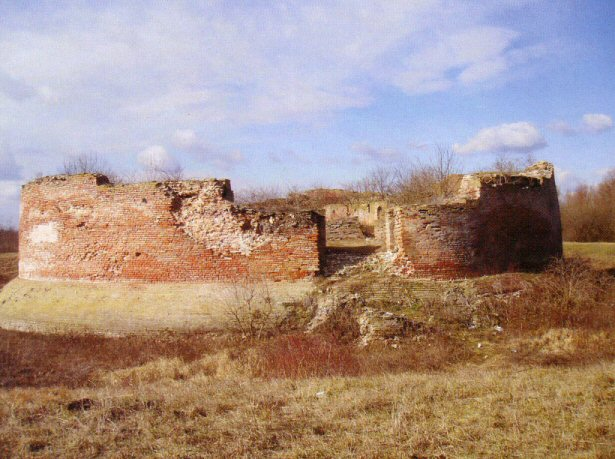
The ruins of the castle of Korođ (Kórógy) in Croatia, the ancient seat of the Kórógyi family

During the initial attempts at canonization of John of Capistrano, initiated by the Újlaki family on whose estate Ilok the preacher died, Elizabeth and Caspar issued a charter in Osijek in April 1460, in which they described the miraculous resurrection of their servant during a military campaign against the Turks in Serbia. Additionally, the collection of miracles of Capistrano from this period records Caspar's healing from gastrointestinal bleeding after he made a vow to the Franciscan friar at his grave.

Prior to 1467, Caspar Kórógyi was engaged to Apollonia Rozgonyi. She was a daughter of the powerful baron John Rozgonyi, who has been Master of the treasury at the time of the betrothal. However, Kórógyi broke off his engagement with Apollonia to marry another woman, who was also his relative and was considered an "uncanonical marriage". His act caused a great uproar among the Hungarian elite, accusing him of oath-breaking and adultery, which did not remain without consequences, which was also reinforced by the influential court positions of the wealthy Rozgonyi family. In early 1467, King Matthias confiscated the fortified manor of Szeglak (present-day a borough of Harkanovci, Croatia) and the surrounding villages in Baranya County from Kórógyi and donated them to his royal courtier Balthasar Ramocsa. In the period after the break-off of the engagement, Elizabeth Garai donated almost all of their estates to the Rozgonyis, which could be connected with the act of breaking off the engagement, which, in addition to losing royal favor, put the family in difficult circumstances. In April 1467, King Matthias exempted those lands from the jurisdiction of the Banate of Macsó. According to Elizabeth's statement in May 1467, her decision to donate extensive lands to the Rozgonyis affected the forts Drenovac, Orljavac, Nevna and Ivankovo, in addition to several settlements in Križevci, Požega and Valkó counties. In June 1467, she negotiated in Nevna with Nicholas Újlaki, who was appointed by the king to carry out the sentence. There, Elizabeth renounced further estates and market towns in favor of the Rozgonyi family. The Rozgonyis also possessed Baranyavár, the lordship of Kórógy (together with Csapa and other surrounding villages), the towns Osijek, Aljmaš (Hagymás) and Draszád in 1469, when their tax register was completed. In 1471, Caspar sold his portions in Németi and Sarvaš to the Berislavić family of Grabarje.

Shortly after the death of John Rozgonyi in 1471, King Matthias pardoned Caspar, citing his young age and the merits of his family, which they had accomplished in the service of the Kingdom of Hungary, and returned the previously confiscated estates to him. However, sometimes in early 1472, Caspar Kórógyi was killed in a minor border clash with the Turks, which resulted the extinction of the Kórógyi family after three centuries. According to the calculations made by historian Pál Engel, Kórógyi possessed four castles, 11 market towns and 284 villages at the time of his death. King Matthias granted his landholdings to his cousin Nicholas Csupor, but John Ungor de Nádasd also received a smaller portion of the wealth. The Rozgonyis protested against the king's decision.

== Folk tradition ==
The figure of Caspar Kórógyi and his scandalous marriage became part of the local folklore that developed around the castle of Kórógy. According to a variant, Kórógyi fell in love with a Hungarian village girl of low birth called Verág (Virág). However, Kórógyi's mother ordered him to marry the daughter of a German count. As a result, on the day of the wedding of Kórógyi and the countess, Verág appeared at the fortress with her child (who was begotten by Caspar) in her arms, and threw himself into the water-filled moat surrounding the castle with the child, but before that she cursed Kórógy and all its inhabitants. Caspar Kórógyi galloped off on his horse into the darkness and was never seen again. Later it was heard that he died in a war in Italy. The story narrates that the German countess then returned home. Kórógyi's mother also died in pain, and the cursed castle began to wither away. Since then, every seven years on the day of the drowning, from midnight until the first roosters crow at dawn, the ghost of the poor girl cries and walks around the fortress and the area around it, looking for her beloved. Croatian author Vladimir Prohaska preserved and expanded the tradition in his novel Kolođvarska djevica ("The Virgin of Kolođvar"), published in Osijek in 1938.

== Sources ==
- Andrić, Stanko (2009). "Korođski (Kórógyi)". Hrvatski Biografski Leksikon (in Croatian). Miroslav Krleža Lexicographical Institute.
- Brkanić, Monika (2026). "Bračne veze obitelji Korođski [Marriage Alliances of the Family of Kórógy]". Osijeker Sammelband (in Croatian). 41. Muzej Slavonije Osijek: 9–15. ISSN 0473-4882.
- Engel, Pál (1996). Magyarország világi archontológiája, 1301–1457, I. [Secular Archontology of Hungary, 1301–1457, Volume I] (in Hungarian). História, MTA Történettudományi Intézete. ISBN 963-8312-44-0.
- Mažuran, Ive (1994). Srednjovjekovni i turski Osijek [Medieval and Turkish Osijek] (in Croatian). Zavod za znanstveni rad HAZU u Osijeku, Gradsko poglavarstvo Osijek, Školska knjiga Zagreb. ISBN 953-154-040-3.
- Varga Oswald, Tina; Njari, Denis (2024). "Korođvar u povijesno-književnom kontekstu razvijenoga i kasnoga srednjeg vijeka [Korođvar in the Historical and Literary Context of the High and Late Middle Ages]". Studia Slavica Savariensia (in Croatian). 2022 (1–2). ELTE Savaria Egyetemi Központ Szlavisztika Tanszék: 141–151. ISSN 1216-0016.

Caspar House of Kórógyi Born: 1440s Died: 1472
Hungarian nobility
Preceded by John Kórógyi	— TITULAR — Count of Castell; 1456–1472	Extinct
