= D423 road =

Road in Croatia

D423 state road

Route information
- Length: 6.1 km (3.8 mi)

Major junctions
- From: D514 in Slavonski Brod
- To: Port of Slavonski Brod

Location
- Country: Croatia
- Counties: Brod-Posavina
- Major cities: Slavonski Brod

Highway system
- Highways in Croatia

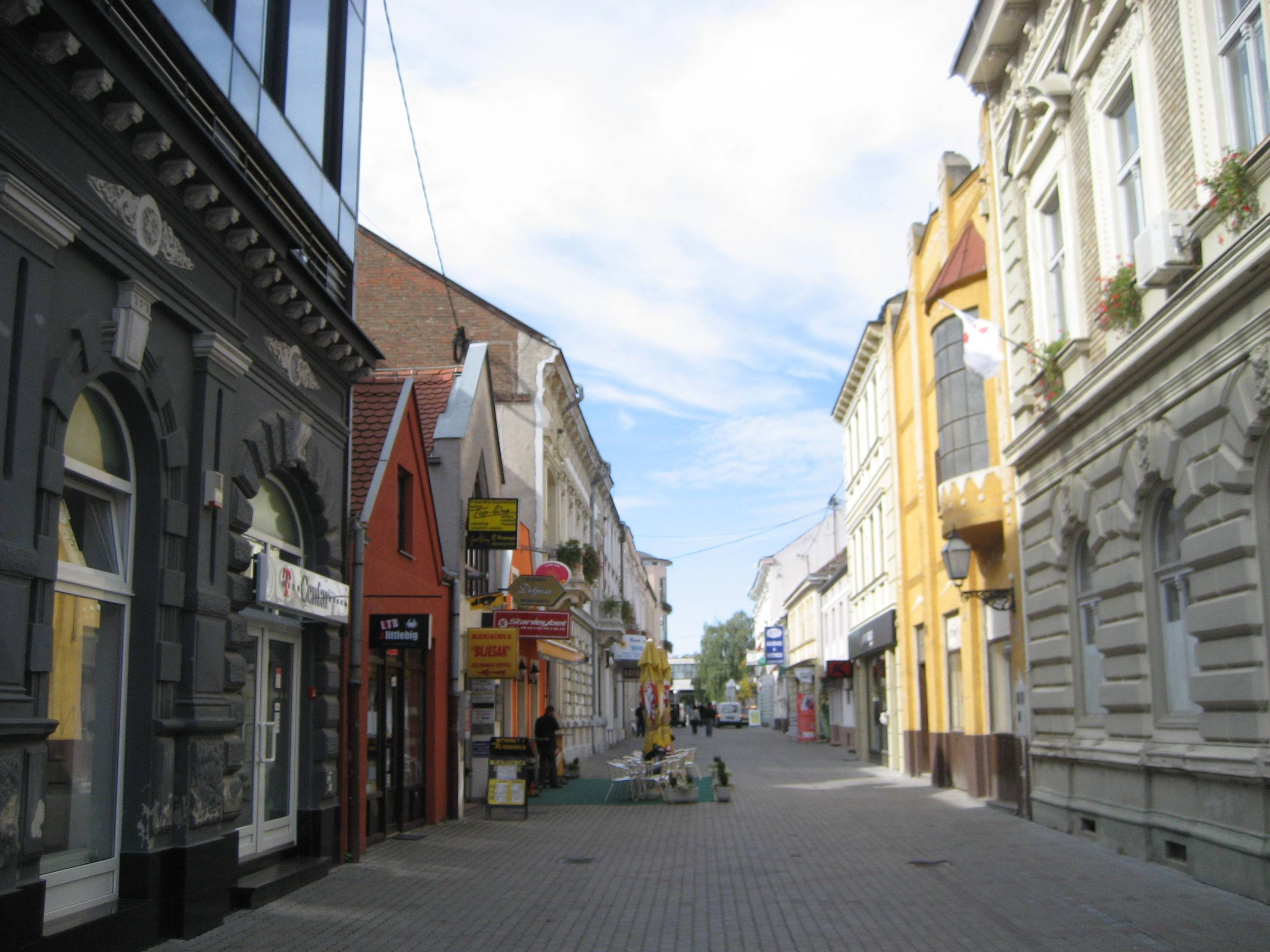
Slavonski Brod, at the northern terminus of the D423 road

D423 is a state road in Slavonia region of Croatia, connecting the Port of Slavonski Brod to the city of Slavonski Brod and the A3 motorway Slavonski Brod istok (east) interchange via D514 state road. The road is 6.1 km (3.8 mi) long.

As the road passes through an urban zone, it comprises a substantial number of street intersections, some of which are regulated by traffic lights.

The road, as well as all other state roads in Croatia, is managed and maintained by Hrvatske Ceste, state owned company.

== Road junctions and populated areas ==
D423 junctions/populated areas
Type	Slip roads/Notes
	Slavonski Brod; D514 to the A3 motorway Slavonski Brod istok (east) interchange and to the city centre and the border crossing to Bosanski Brod, Bosnia and Herzegovina via D53. Ž4210 to Trnjanski Kuti, Oprisavci, Jaruge and the D7 state road. Ž4211 within the city. Ž4212 to Donja Vrba and Zadubravlje. Ž4214 within the city. The northern terminus of the road.
	Port of Slavonski Brod; The southern terminus of the road.
