= Vučjak =

Vučjak is a Serbo-Croatian toponym, derived from vuk (wolf), also meaning "shepherd dog". It may refer to:

- Kamenski Vučjak, a village in Croatia
- Čečavački Vučjak, a village near Brestovac, Croatia
- Vučjak Feričanački, a village near Feričanci, Croatia
- Vučjak (mountain, northern Bosnia), a mountain in Bosnia and Herzegovina
- Vučjak (mountain, western Bosnia), a mountain in Bosnia and Herzegovina
- Vučjak, a peak of Velebit, Croatia

== See also ==
- Wolves of Vučjak, Serb paramilitary
