= Granje =

Granje may refer to the following places:

- Granje, Bosnia and Herzegovina
- Granje, Croatia
