= D313 road =

Road in Croatia

D313 state road

Route information
- Length: 1.93 km (1.20 mi)

Major junctions
- From: Ž4157 in Nova Gradiška
- To: D51 near Rešetari

Location
- Country: Croatia
- Counties: Brod-Posavina
- Major cities: Nova Gradiška

Highway system
- Highways in Croatia

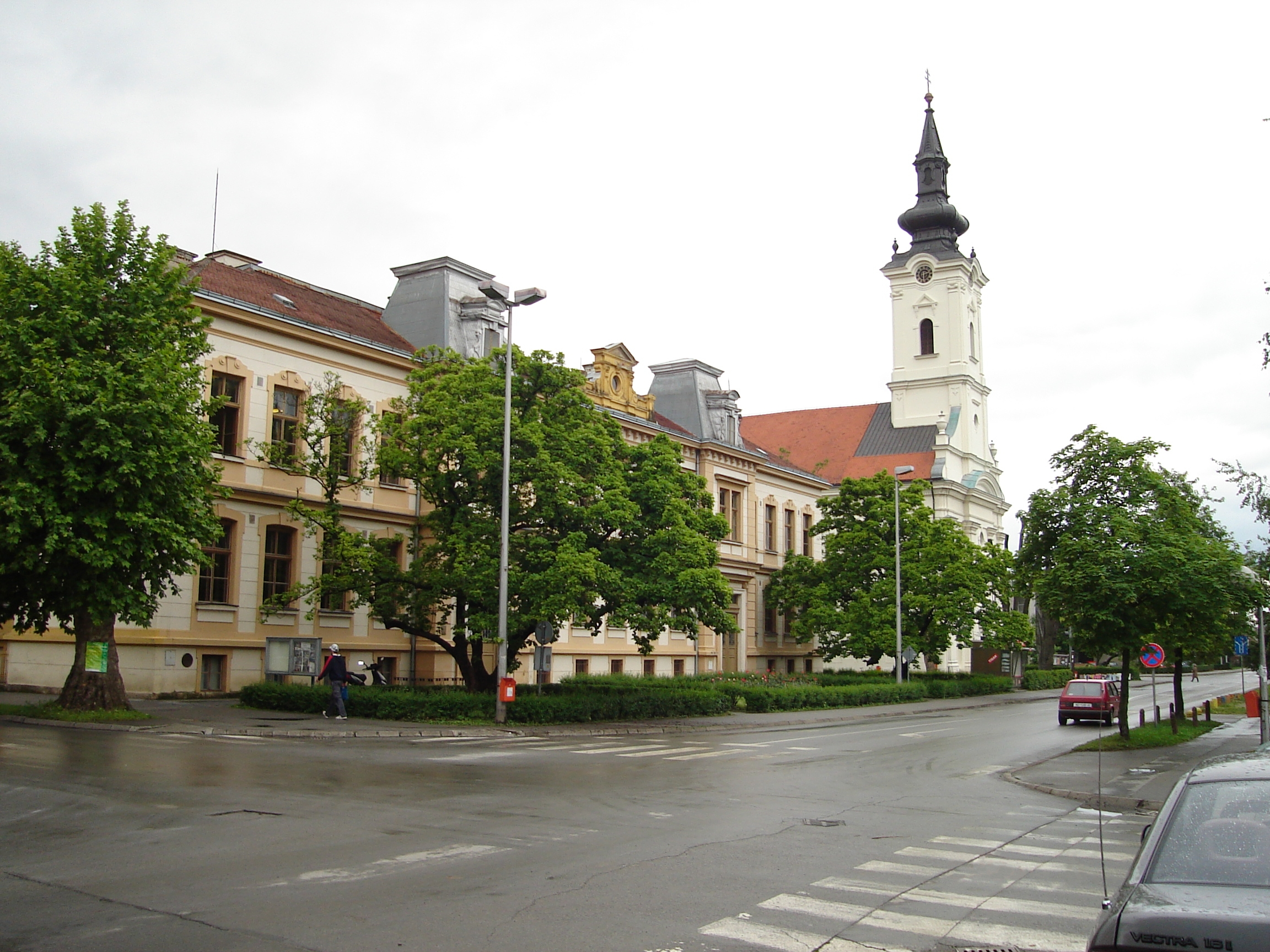
Nova Gradiška, at the western terminus of the D313 road

D313 is a state road in Slavonia region of Croatia connecting the town of Nova Gradiška to the D51 road near Rešetari to north of the A3 motorway. The road is 1.93 km (1.20 mi) long.

The road, as well as all other state roads in Croatia, is managed and maintained by Hrvatske ceste, state owned company.

== Road junctions and populated areas ==
D313 junctions
Type	Slip roads/Notes
	Nova Gradiška; Ž4157 to Bodovaljci (to the south) and to Ž4158 (to the north). Ž4158 (via Ž4157) to Okučani (D5) (to the west) and to Staro Petrovo Selo and Batrina (D49) (to the east). Ž4240 within Nova Gradiška itself. The western terminus of the road.
	D51 to Požega (to the north) and A3 motorway Nova Gradiška interchange (to the south). The eastern terminus of the road.

== See also ==
- A3 motorway
