= Striježevica =

Striježevica may refer to:

- Striježevica, Croatia, a village near Brestovac
- Striježevica, Bosnia and Herzegovina, a village near Doboj, Republika Srpska
