= D69 road =

Road in Croatia

D69 state road

Route information
- Length: 50.9 km (31.6 mi)

Major junctions
- From: D2 in Slatina
- To: D38 in Kamenska

Location
- Country: Croatia
- Counties: Virovitica-Podravina, Požega-Slavonia
- Major cities: Slatina

Highway system
- Highways in Croatia

D69 is a state road in the Slavonia region of Croatia connecting Slatina and Kamenska, i.e. the D2 and D38 state roads. The road is 50.9 km (31.6 mi) long.

The road, as well as all other state roads in Croatia, is managed and maintained by Hrvatske ceste, state owned company.

== Road junctions and populated areas ==
County	Location	Destinations	Notes
Virovitica-Podravina County	Slatina	D2 to Našice (D53, D515) (east) and to Virovitica (D5) (west)	Northern terminus
Virovitica-Podravina County	Čeralije	Ž4253 to Drenovac, Velika and Požega	
Požega-Slavonia County	Bokane		
Požega-Slavonia County	Macute		
Požega-Slavonia County	Voćin	Ž4044 to the Ž4028 county road	
Požega-Slavonia County	Novo Zvečevo		
Požega-Slavonia County		Ž4100 to Gornji Vrhovci, Gradski Vrhovci, Donji Lipovac and Nova Kapela	
Požega-Slavonia County	Kamenski Vučjak		
Požega-Slavonia County	Striježevica		
Požega-Slavonia County	Kamenska	D38 to Pakrac (D5) (west) and to Požega (D53) (east)	Southern terminus
