= Jasik =

Jasik may refer to:

- Jasik (Pale), a village in Bosnia and Herzegovina
- Jasik (Sokolac), a village in Bosnia and Herzegovina
- Jasik, Croatia, a village near Čaglin
