= Opatovac =

Opatovac may refer to:

- Opatovac, Brod-Posavina County
- Opatovac, Vukovar-Syrmia County
