= Banićevac =

- Village
- Interactive map of Banićevac
- Coordinates: 45°20′N 17°28′E
- Country: Croatia
- County: Brod-Posavina County
- Municipality: Cernik (municipality)

Area
  - Total: 2.4 sq mi (6.2 km^{2})
- Elevation: 994 ft (303 m)

Population (2021)
  - Total: 152
  - Density: 63/sq mi (25/km^{2})
- Time zone: UTC+1 (CET)
  - Summer (DST): UTC+2 (CEST)
- Postal code: 35404 Cernik
- Area code: +385 35

Banićevac is a village in the municipality of Cernik in Brod-Posavina County in the Republic of Croatia.

== Geography ==
Banievac is located northeast of Cernik and Nova Gradiška on the slopes of Požeška gora mountain at the entrance to the Požega Valley. Opršinac to the east, Baćin Dol to the south, and Oblakovac to the north are neighbouring villages.
