= D69 =

D69 may refer to:

- Queen's Gambit Declined, Encyclopaedia of Chess Openings code
- D69 (Croatia), a state road in Croatia
- HMAS Vendetta (D69), a destroyer of the Royal Navy and Royal Australian Navy
