= D53 =

D53 may refer to:

- HMS Caledon (D53), a British Royal Navy ship
- INS Ranjit (D53), an Indian Navy Rajput class destroyer
- New South Wales D53 class locomotive, a class of 2-8-0 steam locomotive built for and operated by the New South Wales Government Railways of Australia
- D53 (Croatia), a state road in Croatia
