= Mijaci =

Mijaci may refer to:

- Mijači, village in Croatia
- Mijaks, ethnographic group in the Republic of Macedonia
