= Lapovci =

Lapovci may refer to these places in Croatia:

- Lapovci, Osijek-Baranja County, a village near Trnava and Đakovo
- Lapovci, Vinkovci, a neighbourhood of Vinkovci
