= Ćeralije =

- Village
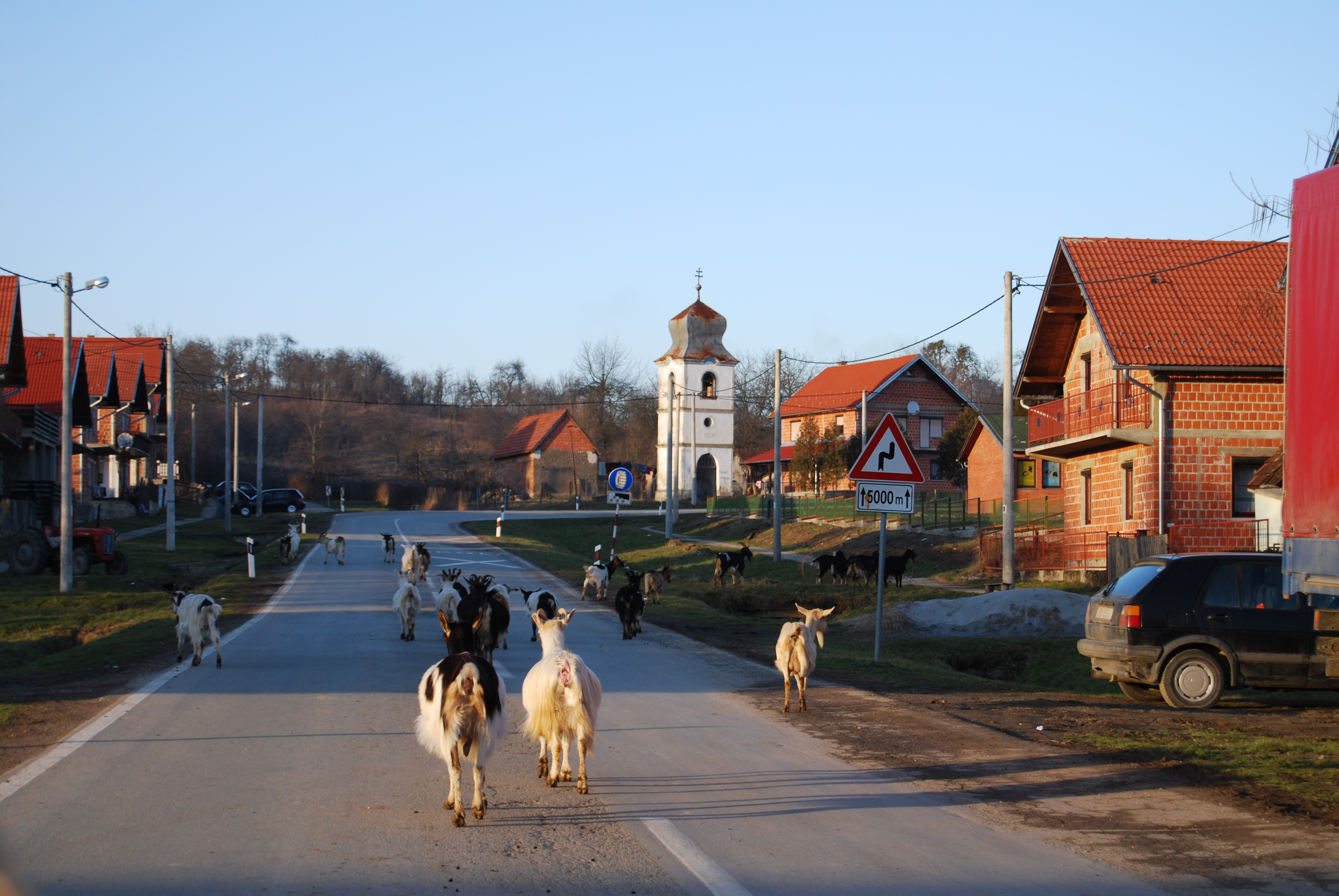
- Street in the village

- Location of Ćeralije in Croatia
- Coordinates: 45°37′19″N 17°41′17″E
- Country: Croatia
- Region: Continental Croatia
- County: Virovitica-Podravina County
- Municipality: Voćin

Area
  - Total: 14.2 km^{2} (5.5 sq mi)
- Elevation: 149 m (489 ft)

Population (2021)
  - Total: 579
  - Density: 40.8/km^{2} (106/sq mi)
- Time zone: UTC+1 (CET)
  - Summer (DST): UTC+2 (CEST)
- Postal code: 33 522
- Area code: (+385) 33

Ćeralije is a village in Croatia, in the municipality of Voćin, Virovitica-Podravina County. It is connected by the D69 highway.

== Demographics ==
According to the 2011 census, the village of Ćeralije has 623 inhabitants. This represents 219.37% of its pre-war population according to the 1991 census.

The 1991 census recorded that 91.55% of the village population were ethnic Serbs (260/284), 4.93% were ethnic Croats (14/284), 1.76% were Yugoslavs (5/284) and 1.76% were of other ethnic origin (5/284).

After 1995, Croats from Kosovo, or more precisely Letnica and surrounding villages, were settled in Ćeralije.

Historical population 1857–2011
v

population	368	610	576	711	733	1003	912	958	513	540	534	457	376	284	596	623
	1857	1869	1880	1890	1900	1910	1921	1931	1948	1953	1961	1971	1981	1991	2001	2011

Sources: Croatian Bureau of Statistics publications

== Notable people ==
- Persa Bosanac, decorated with the Order of the People's Hero
