= Kula, Croatia =

Kula
- Village
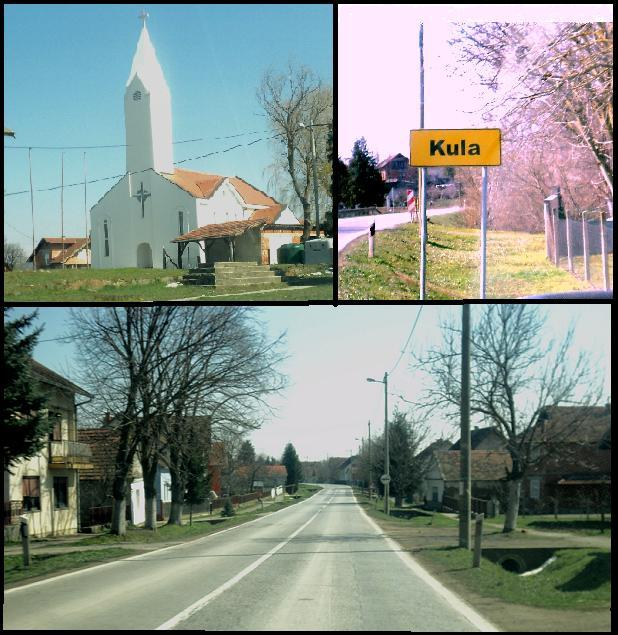
- Kula images

- Location within Croatia
- Coordinates: 45°22′54″N 17°53′49″E
- Country: Croatia
- Region: Požega Valley, Slavonia
- County: Požega-Slavonia
- City: Kutjevo

Area
  - Total: 7.7 km^{2} (3.0 sq mi)
- Elevation: 160 m (520 ft)

Population (2021)
  - Total: 249
  - Density: 32/km^{2} (84/sq mi)
- Time zone: UTC+1 (CET)
  - Summer (DST): UTC+2 (CEST)
- Postal code: 34343
- Area code: 034

Kula (German: Josefsfeld) is a village in Požega-Slavonia County, Croatia. The village is administered as a part of the city of Kutjevo. According to national census of 2011, population of the village is 331. The village is connected by the D51 state road.
