= Novo Zvečevo =

- Village
- Location within Croatia
- Coordinates: 45°32′37″N 17°31′04″E
- Country: Croatia
- Region: Slavonia
- County: Požega-Slavonia County
- Municipality: Brestovac

Area
  - Total: 42.4 km^{2} (16.4 sq mi)
- Elevation: 483 m (1,585 ft)

Population (2021)
  - Total: 24
  - Density: 0.57/km^{2} (1.5/sq mi)
- Time zone: UTC+1 (CET)
  - Summer (DST): UTC+2 (CEST)
- Postal code: 34320
- Area code: 034

Novo Zvečevo (German: Papuck) is a village in Požega-Slavonia County, Croatia. The village was first settled in 1702 by the Danube Swabians. The village is administered as a part of the Brestovac municipality. According to national census of 2001, the population of the village is 27. The village is connected by the D69 state road.

== Climate ==
Since records began in 1986, the highest temperature recorded at the local weather station was 37.2 °C (99.0 °F), on 18 July 2007. The coldest temperature was −24.0 °C (−11.2 °F), on both 31 January 1987 and 9 February 2012.
