= Deževci =

- Village
- Location within Croatia
- Coordinates: 45°22′17″N 17°31′09″E
- Country: Croatia
- Region: Slavonia
- County: Požega-Slavonia County
- Municipality: Brestovac

Area
  - Total: 2.6 km^{2} (1.0 sq mi)
- Elevation: 191 m (627 ft)

Population (2021)
  - Total: 119
  - Density: 46/km^{2} (120/sq mi)
- Time zone: UTC+1 (CET)
  - Summer (DST): UTC+2 (CEST)
- Postal code: 34320
- Area code: 034

Deževci is a village in Požega-Slavonia County, Croatia. The village is administered as a part of the Brestovac municipality. According to the national census of 2011 the population of the village is 157. The village is connected by the D38 state road.
