= Pasikovci =

- Village
- Location within Croatia
- Coordinates: 45°23′23″N 17°30′29″E
- Country: Croatia
- Region: Slavonia
- County: Požega-Slavonia County
- Municipality: Brestovac

Area
  - Total: 3.1 km^{2} (1.2 sq mi)
- Elevation: 201 m (659 ft)

Population (2021)
  - Total: 21
  - Density: 6.8/km^{2} (18/sq mi)
- Time zone: UTC+1 (CET)
  - Summer (DST): UTC+2 (CEST)
- Postal code: 34320
- Area code: 034

Pasikovci is a village in Požega-Slavonia County, Croatia. The village is administered as a part of the Brestovac municipality. According to national census of 2011, population of the village is 22. The village is connected by the D38 state road.
