= Kujnik, Požega-Slavonia County =

Kujnik
- Village
- Location within Croatia
- Coordinates: 45°24′01″N 17°30′13″E
- Country: Croatia
- Region: Slavonia
- County: Požega-Slavonia County
- Municipality: Brestovac

Area
  - Total: 5.7 km^{2} (2.2 sq mi)
- Elevation: 204 m (669 ft)

Population (2021)
  - Total: 24
  - Density: 4.2/km^{2} (11/sq mi)
- Time zone: UTC+1 (CET)
  - Summer (DST): UTC+2 (CEST)
- Postal code: 34320
- Area code: 034

Kujnik is a village in Požega-Slavonia County, Croatia. The village is administered as part of the Brestovac municipality.

According to the 2021 national census, there are 248 people currently living there, which is a significant increase from the 2001 census where the population of the village was 21. The village is connected by the D38 state road.
