= Cerovac, Požega-Slavonia County =

Cerovac
- Village
- Location within Croatia
- Coordinates: 45°21′55″N 17°48′39″E
- Country: Croatia
- Region: Slavonia
- County: Požega-Slavonia County
- Municipality: Jakšić

Area
  - Total: 3.3 km^{2} (1.3 sq mi)
- Elevation: 161 m (528 ft)

Population (2021)
  - Total: 191
  - Density: 58/km^{2} (150/sq mi)
- Time zone: UTC+1 (CET)
  - Summer (DST): UTC+2 (CEST)
- Postal code: 34308
- Area code: 034

Cerovac is a village in Požega-Slavonia County, Croatia. The village is administered as a part of the Jakšić municipality. According to national census of 2001, population of the village is 257. The village is connected by the D51 state road.
