= Rajsavac =

- Village
- Location within Croatia
- Coordinates: 45°21′48″N 17°47′47″E
- Country: Croatia
- Region: Slavonia
- County: Požega-Slavonia County
- Municipality: Jakšić

Area
  - Total: 4.4 km^{2} (1.7 sq mi)
- Elevation: 166 m (545 ft)

Population (2021)
  - Total: 272
  - Density: 62/km^{2} (160/sq mi)
- Time zone: UTC+1 (CET)
  - Summer (DST): UTC+2 (CEST)
- Postal code: 34308
- Area code: 034

Rajsavac is a village in Požega-Slavonia County, Croatia. The village is administered as a part of the Jakšić municipality. According to national census of 2011, population of the village is 313. The village is connected by the D51 state road.
