= Vrbje =

- Interactive map of Vrbje
- Location within Croatia
- Coordinates: 45°11′N 17°25′E
- Country: Croatia
- County: Brod-Posavina County

Government
  - Mayor: Igor Jurišić (HSS)

Area
  - Total: 79.3 km^{2} (30.6 sq mi)

Population (2021)
  - Total: 1,691
  - Density: 21.3/km^{2} (55.2/sq mi)
- Time zone: UTC+1 (CET)
  - Summer (DST): UTC+2 (CEST)
- Website: vrbje.hr

Vrbje is a village and a municipality in Brod-Posavina County, Croatia.

== History ==
The village of Vrbje was first mentioned in 1720. The local Roman Catholic Church of Saint Joseph was mentioned in 1758 at the time when it was still a wooden construction. A new baroque style church was erected in period between 1773 and 1789 and its most recent reconstruction took place in 1985 during the time of the Socialist Republic of Croatia.

== Demographics ==
In 2021, the municipality had 1,691 residents in the following 7 settlements:

- Bodovaljci, population 410
- Dolina, population 174
- Mačkovac, population 205
- Savski Bok, population 39
- Sičice, population 338
- Visoka Greda, population 167
- Vrbje, population 358
Vrbje: Population trends 1857–2021
v

population	2958	2992	2675	3089	3231	3957	3814	4065	4315	4341	4253	3920	3471	3210	2906	2215	1691
	1857	1869	1880	1890	1900	1910	1921	1931	1948	1953	1961	1971	1981	1991	2001	2011	2021

Sources: Croatian Bureau of Statistics publications

In 2011, 99% of the population were Croats.
