= D53 road =

Road in Croatia

D53 state road

Route information
- Length: 91.7 km (57.0 mi)

Major junctions
- From: Donji Miholjac border crossing to Hungary
- D2 near Našice; D51 near Gradište; D38 near Ruševo; D514 in Slavonski Brod
- To: Slavonski Brod border crossing to Bosnia and Herzegovina

Location
- Country: Croatia
- Counties: Osijek-Baranja, Požega-Slavonia, Brod-Posavina
- Major cities: Našice, Slavonski Brod

Highway system
- Highways in Croatia

D53 is a state road connecting Donji Miholjac, Našice and Slavonski Brod to Slavonski Brod border crossing to Bosnia and Herzegovina and to Donji Miholjac border crossing to Hungary. Furthermore, the road connects to D514 state road which in turn links to the A3 motorway Slavonski Brod - istok (east) interchange. The road is 91.7 km long.

Parts of D53 are concurrent with D2 and D38 state roads.

The road, as well as all other state roads in Croatia, is managed and maintained by Hrvatske ceste, a state-owned company.

== Traffic volume ==
Traffic is regularly counted and reported by Hrvatske ceste, operator of the road.

D53 traffic volume
Road	Counting site	AADT	ASDT	Notes
D53	2401 Donji Miholjac	1,012	1,179	Between the border crossing to Hungary and the D34 junction.
D53	2404 Beničanci	1,505	1,717	Between the Ž4046 and Ž4031 junctions.
D53	2409 Velimirovac	4,992	4,978	Between the Ž4075 and D2 junctions.
D53	3603 Gradac Našički	1,816	n/a	Adjacent to the D51 junction. Average daily traffic figure available only.
D53	3503 Čaglin	1,629	1,812	Adjacent to the Ž4124 junction.
D53	3607 Rastušje	3,266	3,410	The southernmost counting site on the route.

== Road junctions and populated areas ==
D53 major junctions/populated areas
Type	Slip roads/Notes
	Donji Miholjac border crossing to Hungary. Northern terminus of the road. D53 northbound traffic defaults to Hungarian route 58.
	Donji Miholjac; D34 to Belišće, Osijek and A5 motorway (to the east) and to Slatina and D2 (to the east).
	Rakitovica
	Miholjački Poreč - Ž4046 to Golinci and Ž4047 to Čamagajevci
	Magadenovac
	Beničanci
	Malinovac
	Klokočevci - Ž4066 to Bokšić
	Pribiševci/Velimirovac - Ž4075 to Đurđenovac
	D2 to Osijek, and to Đakovo and A5 via D515 state road. D2 and D7 state roads are concurrent between this intersection and Martin intersection, where D2 route diverges towards Slatina.
	Martin; D2 to Slatina. D2 and D7 state roads are concurrent between this intersection and the intersection to the north, where D2 route diverges towards Osijek.
	Našice
	Zoljan
	Gradac Našički
	D51 to Požega.
	Vukojevica
	Milanlug
	Čaglin
	Migalovci
	Ruševo; D38 to Đakovo. D7 and D38 state roads are concurrent between this intersection and a junction south of Ruševo, where D38 route diverges to Pleternica.
	D38 to Pleternica. D7 and D38 state roads are concurrent between this intersection and a junction to the north, in Ruševo, where D38 route diverges to Đakovo.
	Gornji Slatnik
	Ž4162 to Brodski Zdenci.
	Podcrkavlje
	Rastušje
	Podvinje
	Slavonski Brod; D514 to A3 motorway Slavonski Brod istok (east) interchange. D525 to Pleternica and A3 motorway Slavonski Brod zapad (west) interchange.
	Slavonski Brod border crossing to Bosnia and Herzegovina. Southern terminus of the road.
