= Savski Bok =

- Village
- Interactive map of Savski Bok
- Coordinates: 45.177°N 17.312°E
- Country: Croatia
- County: Brod-Posavina County
- Municipality: Vrbje

Area
  - Total: 2.3 km^{2} (0.89 sq mi)

Population (2021)
  - Total: 39
  - Density: 17/km^{2} (44/sq mi)
- Time zone: UTC+1 (CET)
  - Summer (DST): UTC+2 (CEST)
- Postal code: 35400 Nova Gradiška
- Area code: +385 (0)35

Savski Bok is a village in Vrbje municipality, Croatia.

== History ==
At 11:30 local time on 17 May 2021, a tornado was observed near Savski Bok.

== Demographics ==
Village of Savski Bok: Population trends 1857–2021
v

population													86	60	87	57	39
	1857	1869	1880	1890	1900	1910	1921	1931	1948	1953	1961	1971	1981	1991	2001	2011	2021

Note:Samostalno naselje od 1981. nastalo izdvajanjem dijela područja naselja Mačkovac. Od 1857. do 1971. podaci su sadržani u naselju Mačkovac. Sources: Croatian Bureau of Statistics publications
