= Oprisavci =

- Interactive map of Oprisavci
- Location within Croatia
- Coordinates: 45°09′N 18°14′E
- Country: Croatia
- County: Brod-Posavina County

Government
  - Mayor: Pejo Kovačević (SDP)

Area
  - Total: 59.7 km^{2} (23.1 sq mi)

Population (2021)
  - Total: 1,968
  - Density: 33.0/km^{2} (85.4/sq mi)
- Time zone: UTC+1 (CET)
  - Summer (DST): UTC+2 (CEST)
- Postal code: 35214 Donji Andrijevci
- Website: opcina-oprisavci.hr

Oprisavci is a village and a municipality in Brod-Posavina County, Croatia.

== Demographics ==
In 2021, the municipality had 1,968 residents in the following 8 settlements:

- Novi Grad, population 230
- Oprisavci, population 715
- Poljanci, population 210
- Prnjavor, population 182
- Stružani, population 111
- Svilaj, population 216
- Trnjanski Kuti, population 284
- Zoljani, population 20
Oprisavci: Population trends 1857–2021
v

population	2675	2733	2546	2875	3085	3508	3243	3499	3603	3729	3824	3616	3256	3240	2942	2508	1968
	1857	1869	1880	1890	1900	1910	1921	1931	1948	1953	1961	1971	1981	1991	2001	2011	2021

Sources: Croatian Bureau of Statistics publications

In 2011, 98% of the population declared themselves Croats.

== Gallery ==
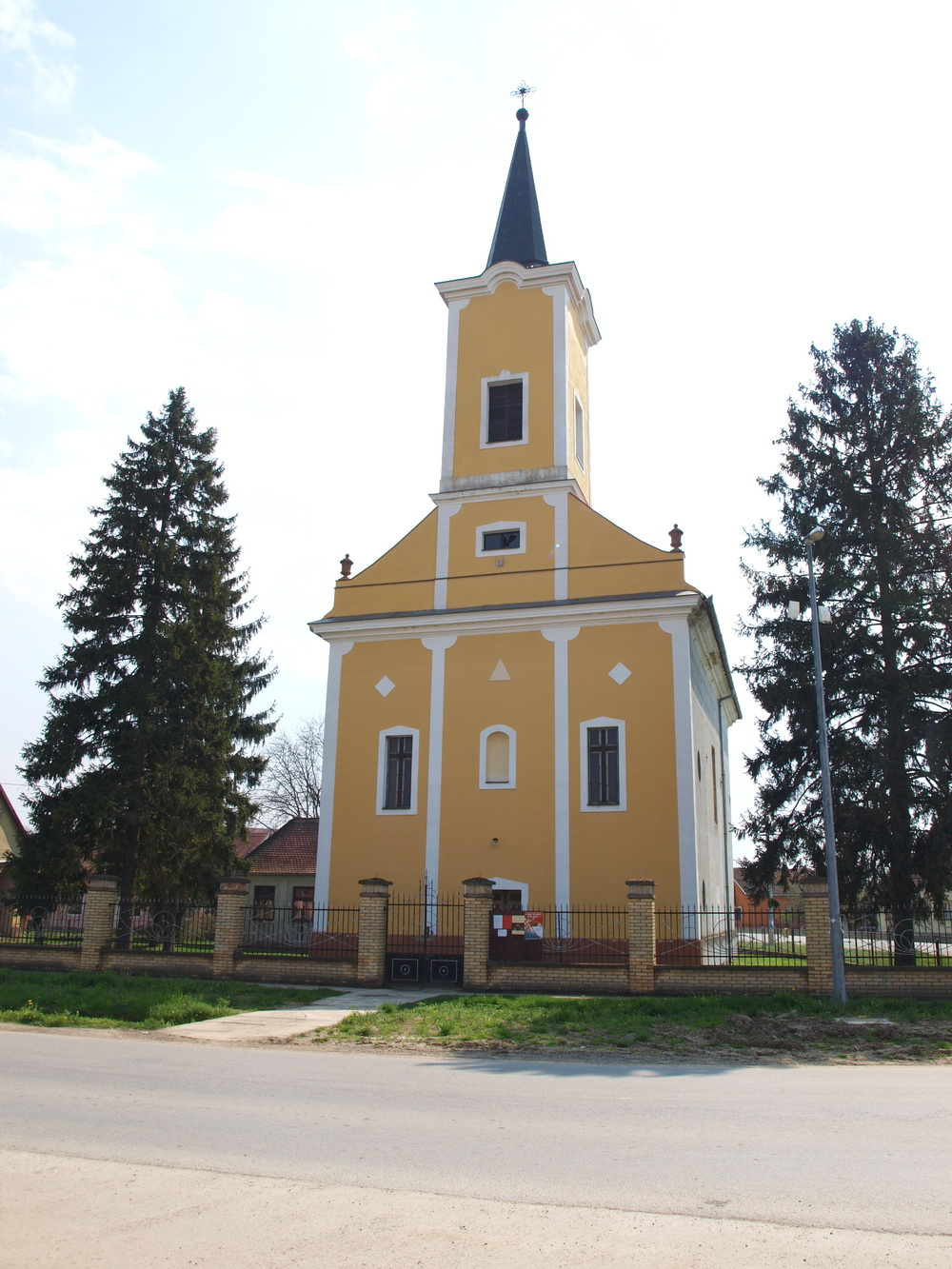
Church at Oprisavci

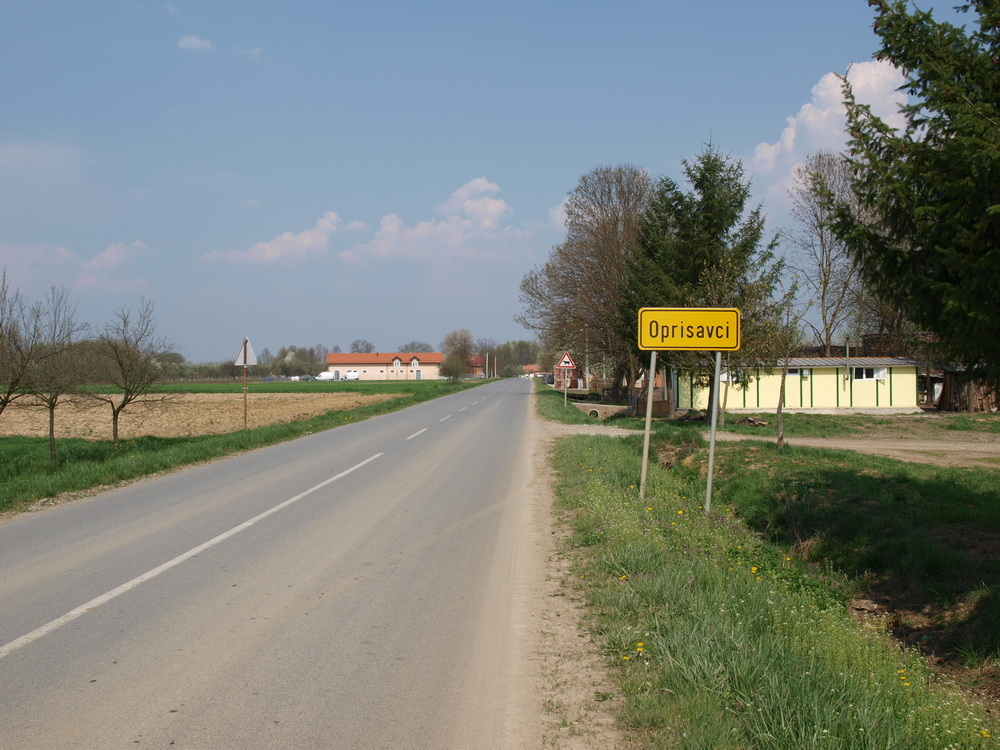
Town access

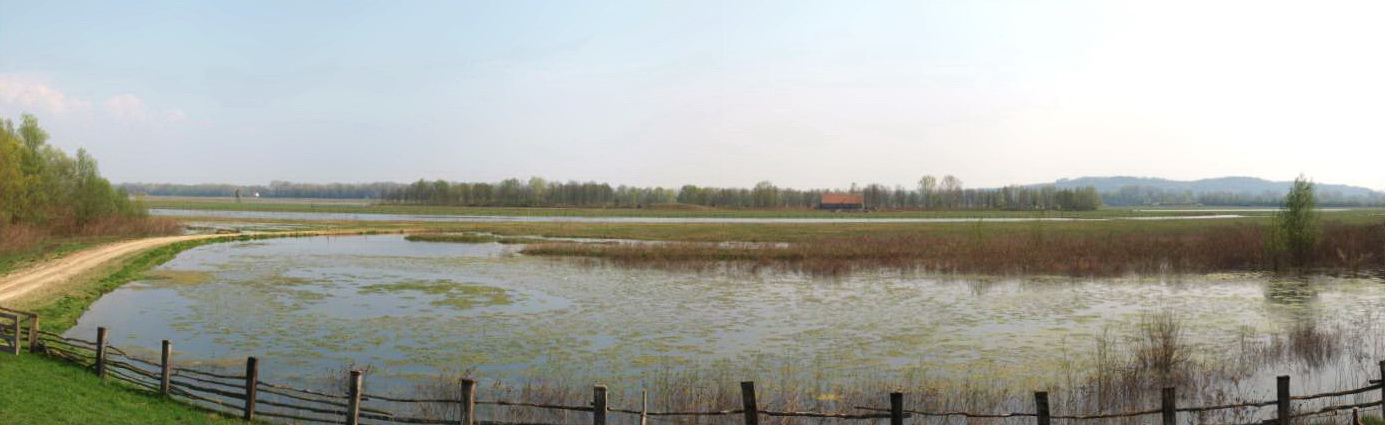
Protected lands

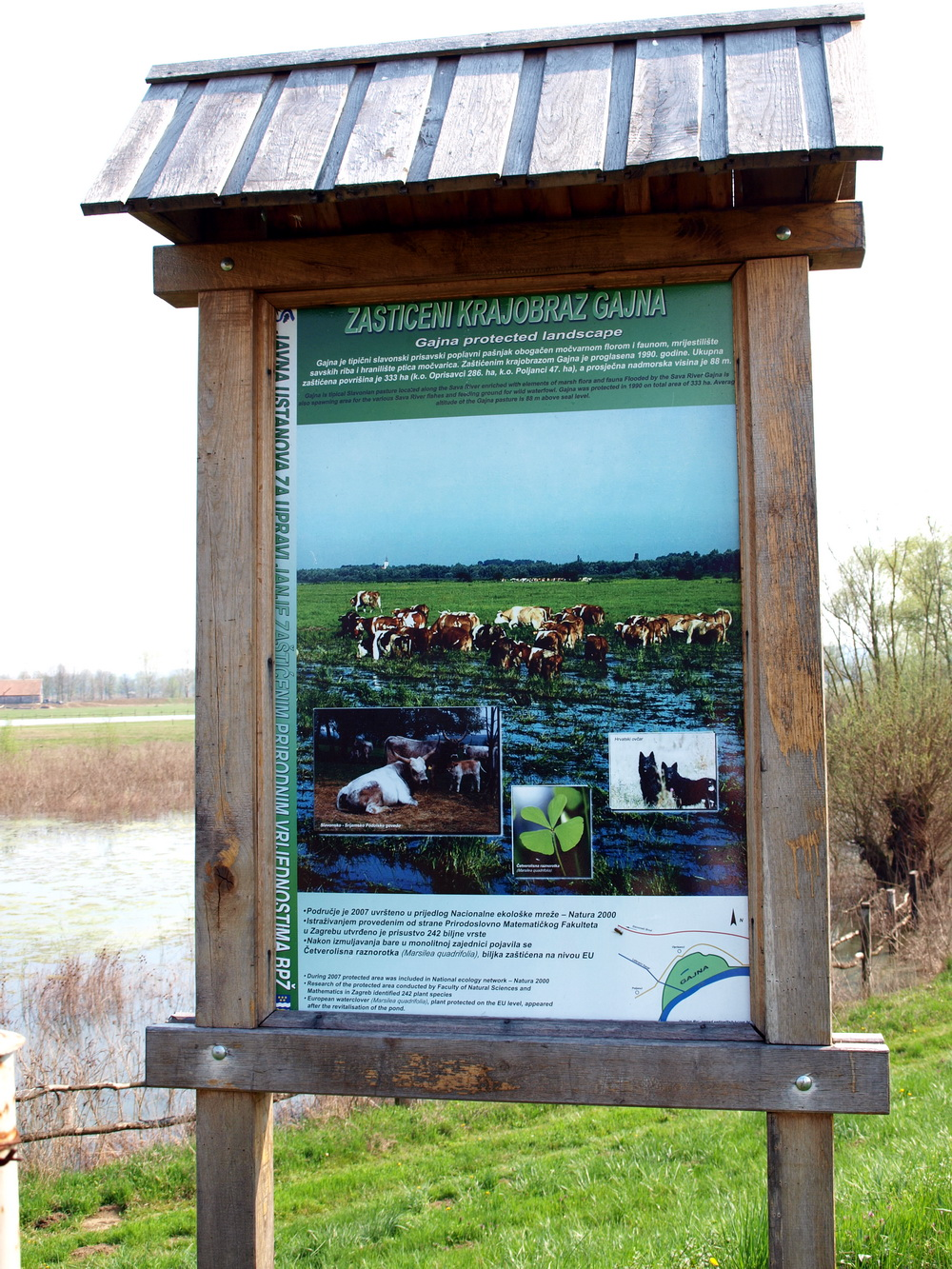
Entrance to Park
