= Dragotin =

- Village (Selo)
- Location within Croatia
- Coordinates: 45°15′N 18°19′E
- Country: Croatia
- County: Osijek-Baranja County
- Municipality: Trnava

Area
  - Total: 5.8 km^{2} (2.2 sq mi)

Population (2021)
  - Total: 191
  - Density: 33/km^{2} (85/sq mi)
- Time zone: UTC+1 (CET)
  - Summer (DST): UTC+2 (CEST)

Dragotin is a village in Croatia.
