= Djedina Rijeka =

- Village
- Location within Croatia
- Coordinates: 45°18′30″N 17°56′55″E
- Country: Croatia
- Region: Slavonia
- County: Požega-Slavonia County
- Municipality: Čaglin

Area
  - Total: 8.6 km^{2} (3.3 sq mi)
- Elevation: 156 m (512 ft)

Population (2021)
  - Total: 99
  - Density: 12/km^{2} (30/sq mi)
- Time zone: UTC+1 (CET)
  - Summer (DST): UTC+2 (CEST)
- Postal code: 34350
- Area code: 034

Djedina Rijeka is a village in Požega-Slavonia County, Croatia. The village is administered as a part of the Čaglin municipality.

According to national census of 2011, population of the village is 129. The village is connected by the D38 state road.
