= Boričevci =

- Village
- Location within Croatia
- Coordinates: 45°21′37″N 17°32′32″E
- Country: Croatia
- Region: Slavonia
- County: Požega-Slavonia County
- Municipality: Brestovac

Area
  - Total: 1.7 km^{2} (0.66 sq mi)
- Elevation: 179 m (587 ft)

Population (2021)
  - Total: 91
  - Density: 54/km^{2} (140/sq mi)
- Time zone: UTC+1 (CET)
  - Summer (DST): UTC+2 (CEST)
- Postal code: 34322
- Area code: 034

Boričevci is a village in Požega-Slavonia County, Croatia. The village is administered as a part of the Brestovac municipality. According to national census of 2001, population of the village is 137. The village is connected by the D38 state road.
