= Busnovi, Croatia =

Busnovi
- Village
- Location within Croatia
- Coordinates: 45°20′32″N 17°31′13″E
- Country: Croatia
- Region: Slavonia
- County: Požega-Slavonia County
- Municipality: Brestovac

Area
  - Total: 4.3 km^{2} (1.7 sq mi)
- Elevation: 222 m (728 ft)

Population (2021)
  - Total: 72
  - Density: 17/km^{2} (43/sq mi)
- Time zone: UTC+1 (CET)
  - Summer (DST): UTC+2 (CEST)
- Postal code: 34322
- Area code: 034

Busnovi is a village in Požega-Slavonia County, Croatia. The village is administered as a part of the Brestovac municipality. According to national census of 2011, population of the village is 104. The village is connected by the D51 state road.
