= Svetoblažje =

- Village (Selo)
- Location within Croatia
- Coordinates: 45°16′N 18°18′E
- Country: Croatia
- County: Osijek-Baranja County
- Municipality: Trnava

Area
  - Total: 8.1 km^{2} (3.1 sq mi)

Population (2021)
  - Total: 66
  - Density: 8.1/km^{2} (21/sq mi)
- Time zone: UTC+1 (CET)
  - Summer (DST): UTC+2 (CEST)

Svetoblažje is a village in Croatia. The village is named after the historical church of Saint Blaise that existed at the site.

== History ==
Serbian Orthodox settlers, mostly from Bosnia, arrived in Svetoblažje after the end of Ottoman Empire rule in Pannonian Basin after 1699 Treaty of Karlowitz. The village once had a church bell tower, which was destroyed by explosives in 1992 during the Croatian War of Independence. According to local accounts, on 18 December 18 1991, a group of Serbs of military age from western Đakovo area were mobilized and sent to the barracks in Đakovo to dig trenches along the front line or perform construction and other labor duties.
