= D514 road =

Road in Croatia

D514 state road

Route information
- Length: 2.7 km (1.7 mi)

Major junctions
- From: A3 in Slavonski Brod istok (east) interchange
- To: D53 in Slavonski Brod

Location
- Country: Croatia
- Counties: Brod-Posavina
- Major cities: Slavonski Brod

Highway system
- Highways in Croatia

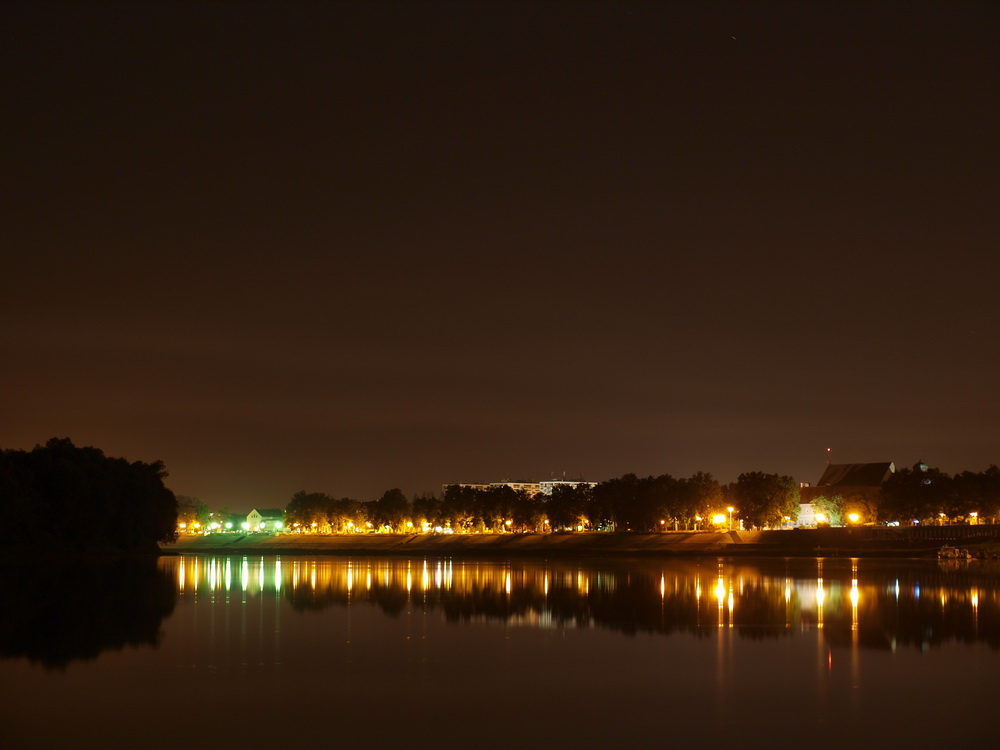
Slavonski Brod, at the southern terminus of the D514 road

D514 is a state road in Slavonia region of Croatia, connecting A3 motorway Slavonski Brod istok (east) interchange to D53 state road and Slavonski Brod. The road is 2.7 km long.

As the road passes through an urban zone, it comprises a substantial number of street intersections, some of which are regulated by traffic lights.

The road, as well as all other state roads in Croatia, is managed and maintained by Hrvatske Ceste, state owned company.

== Traffic volume ==
The D514 state road traffic volume is not reported by Hrvatske Ceste. However, they regularly count and report traffic volume on the A3 motorway Slavonski Brod istok (east) interchange, which connects to the D514 road only, thus permitting the D514 road traffic volume to be accurately calculated. The report includes no information on ASDT volumes.

D514 traffic volume
Road	Counting site	AADT	ASDT	Notes
A3	Slavonski Brod istok (east) interchange	251	n/a	Eastbound A3 traffic leaving the motorway at the interchange.
A3	Slavonski Brod istok (east) interchange	908	n/a	Eastbound A3 traffic entering the motorway at the interchange.
A3	Slavonski Brod istok (east) interchange	895	n/a	Westbound A3 traffic leaving the motorway at the interchange.
A3	Slavonski Brod istok (east) interchange	245	n/a	Westbound A3 traffic entering the motorway at the interchange.
D514	Slavonski Brod istok (east) interchange	2,299	n/a	Total traffic entering/leaving the A1 motorway from/to D520.

== Road junctions and populated areas ==
D514 junctions/populated areas
Type	Slip roads/Notes
	A3 in Slavonski Brod istok interchange. The northern terminus of the road.
	Slavonski Brod: Ž4213 to Bukovlje; D423 to Port of Slavonski Brod. D53 to border crossing to Bosanski Brod, Bosnia and Herzegovina. The southern terminus of the road.

== See also ==
- A3 motorway
