= Bektež =

- Village
- Location within Croatia
- Coordinates: 45°23′39″N 17°55′35″E
- Country: Croatia
- Region: Požega Valley, Slavonia
- County: Požega-Slavonia
- City: Kutjevo

Area
  - Total: 11.8 km^{2} (4.6 sq mi)
- Elevation: 179 m (587 ft)

Population (2021)
  - Total: 296
  - Density: 25.1/km^{2} (65.0/sq mi)
- Time zone: UTC+1 (CET)
  - Summer (DST): UTC+2 (CEST)
- Postal code: 34343
- Area code: 034

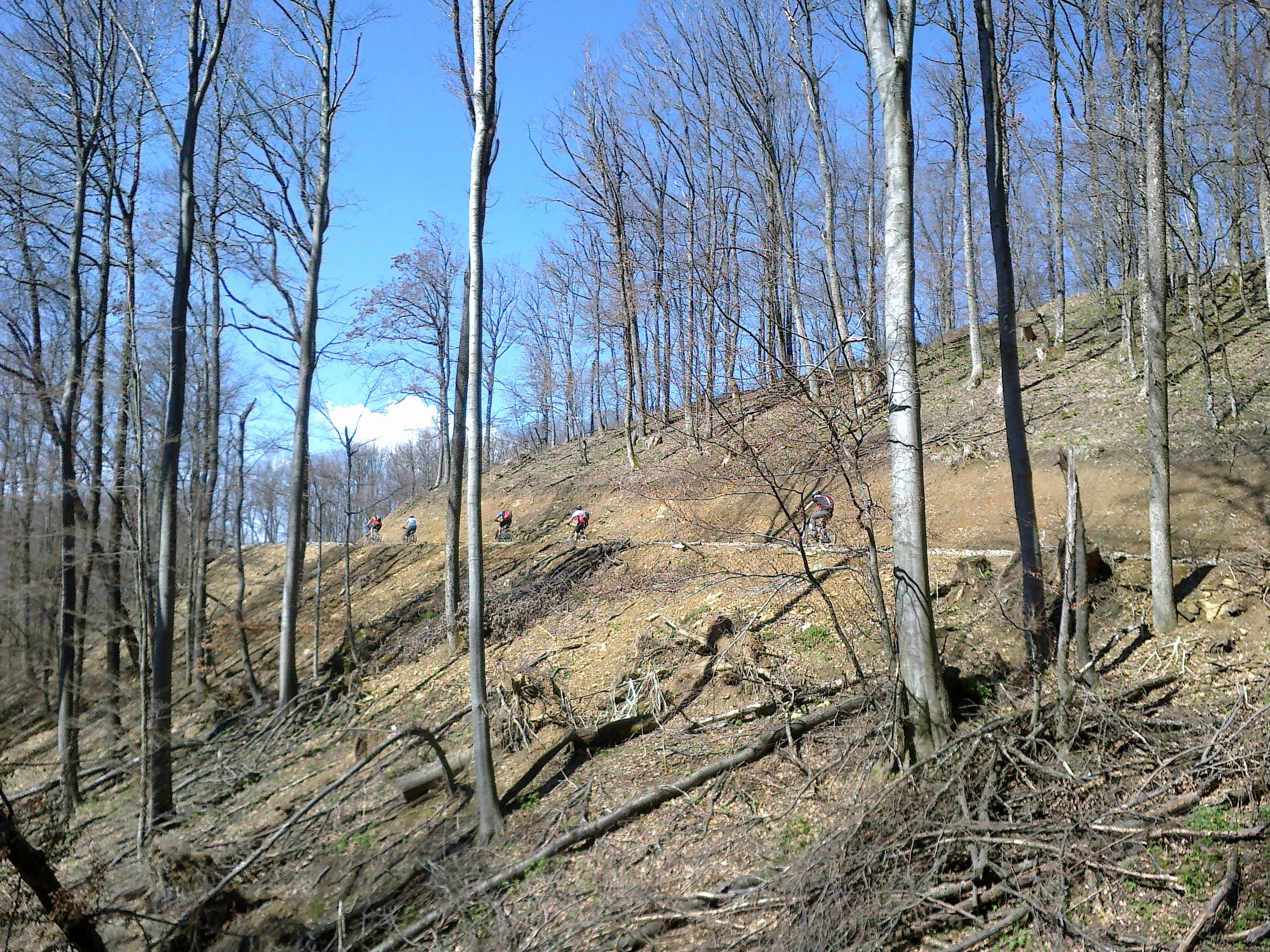

Bektež is a village in Požega-Slavonia County, Croatia. The village is administered as a part of the city of Kutjevo. According to national census of 2001, population of the village is 430. The village is connected by the D51 state road.

Like many other Croatian towns, it has their own Voluenteer Fire Department, DVD Bektež.

It is also where the Bulk Freight Transport company "Roda Trans" is located at.
