= Eminovci =

- Village
- Location within Croatia
- Coordinates: 45°21′16″N 17°43′35″E
- Country: Croatia
- Region: Slavonia
- County: Požega-Slavonia County
- Municipality: Jakšić

Area
  - Total: 5.2 km^{2} (2.0 sq mi)
- Elevation: 144 m (472 ft)

Population (2021)
  - Total: 561
  - Density: 110/km^{2} (280/sq mi)
- Time zone: UTC+1 (CET)
  - Summer (DST): UTC+2 (CEST)
- Postal code: 34308
- Area code: 034

Eminovci is a village in Požega-Slavonia County, Croatia. The village is administered as a part of the Jakšić municipality. According to national census of 2011, population of the village is 640. The village is connected by the D51 state road.
