= Zakorenje =

- Village
- Location within Croatia
- Coordinates: 45°20′11″N 17°33′09″E
- Country: Croatia
- Region: Slavonia
- County: Požega-Slavonia County
- Municipality: Brestovac

Area
  - Total: 6.1 km^{2} (2.4 sq mi)
- Elevation: 195 m (640 ft)

Population (2021)
  - Total: 145
  - Density: 24/km^{2} (62/sq mi)
- Time zone: UTC+1 (CET)
  - Summer (DST): UTC+2 (CEST)
- Postal code: 34322
- Area code: 034

Zakorenje is a village in Požega-Slavonia County, Croatia. The village is administered as a part of the Brestovac municipality. According to national census of 2011, population of the village is 187. The village is connected by the D51 state road.
