= Adžamovci =

Settlement in Brod-Posavina County, Croatia

- settlement
- Interactive map of Adžamovci
- Location within Croatia
- Coordinates: 45°15′04″N 17°27′36″E
- Country: Croatia
- County: Brod-Posavina
- Municipality: Rešetari

Area
  - Total: 5.1 km^{2} (2.0 sq mi)

Population (2021)
  - Total: 446
  - Density: 87/km^{2} (230/sq mi)
- Time zone: UTC+1 (CET)
  - Summer (DST): UTC+2 (CEST)
- Postal code: 35420 Staro Petrovo Selo
- Area code: +385 (0)35

Adžamovci is a settlement in the Municipality of Rešetari in Croatia. In 2021, its population was 446.

== Demographics ==
Adžamovci: Population trends 1857–2021
v

population	247	259	295	394	510	586	569	573	666	653	660	679	644	658	628	612	446
	1857	1869	1880	1890	1900	1910	1921	1931	1948	1953	1961	1971	1981	1991	2001	2011	2021

Sources: Croatian Bureau of Statistics publications
