= Pavlovci, Croatia =

Pavlovci
- Village
- Location within Croatia
- Coordinates: 45°21′57″N 17°31′56″E
- Country: Croatia
- Region: Slavonia
- County: Požega-Slavonia County
- Municipality: Brestovac

Area
  - Total: 4.9 km^{2} (1.9 sq mi)
- Elevation: 181 m (594 ft)

Population (2021)
  - Total: 136
  - Density: 28/km^{2} (72/sq mi)
- Time zone: UTC+1 (CET)
  - Summer (DST): UTC+2 (CEST)
- Postal code: 34322
- Area code: 034

Pavlovci is a village in Požega-Slavonia County, Croatia. The village is administered as a part of the Brestovac municipality. According to national census of 2011, population of the village is 190. The village is connected by the D38 state road.
