= Paka, Požega-Slavonia County =

Paka
- Village
- Location within Croatia
- Coordinates: 45°17′25″N 18°03′33″E
- Country: Croatia
- Region: Slavonia
- County: Požega-Slavonia County
- Municipality: Čaglin

Area
  - Total: 14.2 km^{2} (5.5 sq mi)
- Elevation: 210 m (690 ft)

Population (2021)
  - Total: 15
  - Density: 1.1/km^{2} (2.7/sq mi)
- Time zone: UTC+1 (CET)
  - Summer (DST): UTC+2 (CEST)
- Postal code: 34350
- Area code: 034

Paka is a village in Požega-Slavonia County, Croatia. The village is administered as a part of the Čaglin municipality. According to national census of 2011, population of the village is 33. The village is connected by the D38 state road.
