= Radnovac =

- Village
- Location within Croatia
- Coordinates: 45°21′41″N 17°46′58″E
- Country: Croatia
- Region: Slavonia
- County: Požega-Slavonia County
- Municipality: Jakšić

Area
  - Total: 4.0 km^{2} (1.5 sq mi)
- Elevation: 170 m (560 ft)

Population (2021)
  - Total: 159
  - Density: 40/km^{2} (100/sq mi)
- Time zone: UTC+1 (CET)
  - Summer (DST): UTC+2 (CEST)
- Postal code: 34308
- Area code: 034

Radnovac is a village in Požega-Slavonia County, Croatia. The village is administered as a part of the Jakšić municipality. According to national census of 2001, population of the village is 220. The village is connected by the D51 state road.

Population of the village 1857.-2001.
v

population								102	109	100	134		166	198	220
	1857	1869	1880	1890	1900	1910	1921	1931	1948	1953	1961	1971	1981	1991	2001

Sources: Croatian Bureau of Statistics publications

- Note: First record of village named Radnovac in 1931.
