= Cernik, Brod-Posavina County =

Cernik
- Interactive map of Cernik
- Location within Croatia
- Coordinates: 45°17′24″N 17°22′48″E
- Country: Croatia
- County: Brod-Posavina County

Government
  - Mayor: Nikola Jugović (HDZ)

Area
  - City: 127.9 km^{2} (49.4 sq mi)
  - Urban: 11.8 km^{2} (4.6 sq mi)

Population (2021)
  - City: 2,964
  - Density: 23.17/km^{2} (60.02/sq mi)
  - Urban: 1,426
- Time zone: UTC+1 (CET)
  - Summer (DST): UTC+2 (CEST)
- Postal code: 35400 Nova Gradiška
- Website: cernik.hr

Cernik is a village and a municipality in the Brod-Posavina County. In 2011, the municipality had 3,640 inhabitants. It was ruled by the Ottoman Empire between 1536 and 1691 and was the ultimate centre of the Sanjak of Pakrac until the Austrian conquest.

== Demographics ==
In 2021, the municipality had 2,964 residents in the following 11 settlements:

- Baćin Dol, population 302
- Banićevac, population 152
- Cernik, population 1,426
- Giletinci, population 189
- Golobrdac, population 0
- Opatovac, population 282
- Opršinac, population 0
- Podvrško, population 230
- Sinlije, population 0
- Šagovina Cernička, population 206
- Šumetlica, population 177
Cernik: Population trends 1857–2021
v

population	4166	4909	4840	5204	6133	6553	5548	6105	5952	5965	6023	5492	4859	4661	4235	3640	2964
	1857	1869	1880	1890	1900	1910	1921	1931	1948	1953	1961	1971	1981	1991	2001	2011	2021

Sources: Croatian Bureau of Statistics publications
