= Dolac, Požega-Slavonia County =

Coordinates: 45°19′28″N 17°35′23″E

Dolac

Dolac is a village near Brestovac, Croatia. In the 2011 census, it had 203 inhabitants.
