= Beničanci =

- Village (Selo)
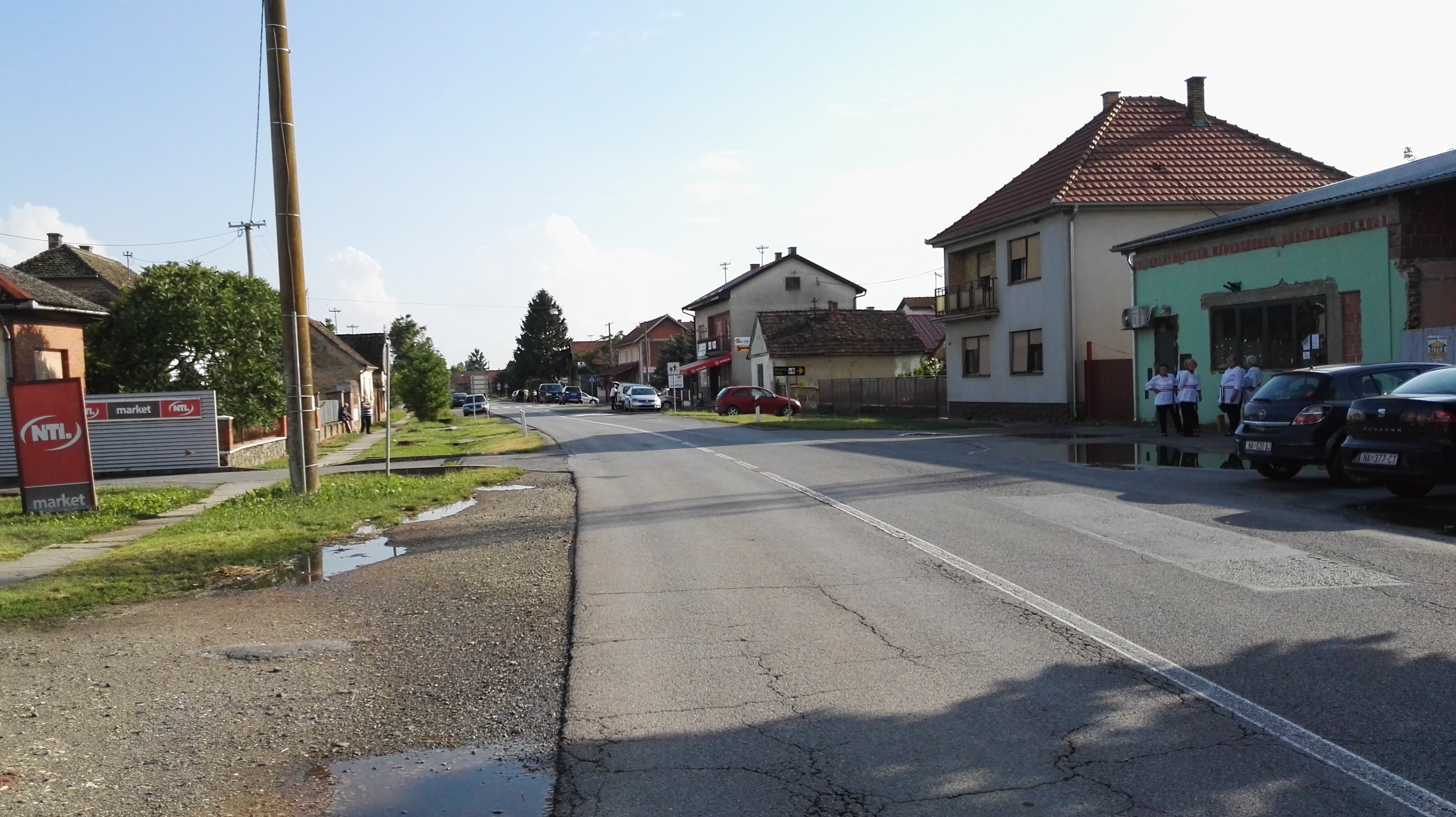
- Beničanci main street

- Location within Osijek-Baranja County Location within Croatia Location within Europe
- Country: Croatia
- County: Osijek-Baranja County

Area
  - Total: 7.1 km^{2} (2.7 sq mi)

Population (2021)
  - Total: 395
  - Density: 56/km^{2} (140/sq mi)
- Time zone: UTC+1 (CET)
  - Summer (DST): UTC+2 (CEST)

Beničanci is a village in Croatia. It is connected by the D53 highway.

== Name ==
The name of the village in Croatian is plural.
