= Macute =

- Village
- Location of Macute in Croatia
- Coordinates: 45°37′N 17°38′E
- Country: Croatia
- Region: Continental Croatia
- County: Virovitica-Podravina County
- Municipality: Voćin

Area
  - Total: 7.6 sq mi (19.7 km^{2})

Population (2021)
  - Total: 19
  - Density: 2.5/sq mi (0.96/km^{2})
- Time zone: UTC+1 (CET)
  - Summer (DST): UTC+2 (CEST)
- Postal code: 33 522
- Area code: (+385) 33

Macute is a village in Croatia, in the municipality of Voćin, Virovitica-Podravina County. It is connected by the D69 highway.

== Demographics ==
According to the 2011 census, the village of Macute has 33 inhabitants. This represents 11.54% of its pre-war population according to the 1991 census.

The 1991 census recorded that 97.20% of the village population were ethnic Serbs (278/286), 2.10% were ethnic Croats (6/286), 0.35% were Yugoslavs (1/286) and 0.35% were of other ethnic origin (1/286).

Historical population 1857-2011
v

population	374	393	355	461	530	618	604	651	428	461	438	330	303	286	79	33
	1857	1869	1880	1890	1900	1910	1921	1931	1948	1953	1961	1971	1981	1991	2001	2011

Sources: Croatian Bureau of Statistics publications
