= Velimirovac =

Village in Croatia

Velimirovac Welimirowatz Selište
- Village (Selo)
- Interactive map of Velimirovac
- Location within Osijek-Baranja County Location within Croatia Location within Europe
- Coordinates: 45.525°N 18.1°E
- Country: Croatia
- County: Osijek-Baranja

Area
  - Total: 3.9 sq mi (10.2 km^{2})

Population (2021)
  - Total: 1,144
  - Density: 290/sq mi (112/km^{2})
- Time zone: UTC+1 (CET)
  - Summer (DST): UTC+2 (CEST)

Velimirovac (German: Welimirowatz) is a village in Osijek-Baranja County in the municipality of Našice in Croatia.

== Geography ==
It is located north of Našice on the D53. To the west of the village is Đurđenovac, while to the east is Jelisavac. The village is roughly 10 km^{2} in size.

== History ==
The village was previously called Selište. During the late 19th century, Adam Oster served as mayor.

== Demographics ==
In the 2011 census, Velimirovac had 1,129 inhabitants in 360 households.

== Religion ==
Velimirovac is the seat of the Roman Catholic parish of the Lady of Fatima.

== Sports ==
- Velimirovac is home to the "Wels" bocce club.
- NK Croatia Velimirovac competes in the 2. ŽNL Osječko-baranjska. Fan group: "Wells"
- Chess Club "Radnik"

The "Valent Pintarić" Memorial Chess Tournament has been held since 1987.

== Organizations ==
- Cultural and Artistic Society "Tamburica" Velimirovac
- Volunteer Fire Department Velimirovac
