= Brestovac, Croatia =

Brestovac
- Village
- Location within Croatia
- Coordinates: 45.33059°N 17.596343°E
- Country: Croatia
- Region: Slavonia (Požega Valley)
- County: Požega-Slavonia County

Government
  - Mayor: Zdravko Mandić (HDZ)

Area
  - Village: 279.5 km^{2} (107.9 sq mi)
  - Urban: 8.7 km^{2} (3.4 sq mi)

Population (2021)
  - Village: 2,980
  - Density: 10.7/km^{2} (27.6/sq mi)
  - Urban: 597
  - Urban density: 69/km^{2} (180/sq mi)
- Time zone: UTC+1 (Central European Time)
- Website: brestovac.hr

Brestovac is a village and a municipality in eastern Croatia, located west of Požega.

In the 2011 census, there were 3,726 inhabitants in the municipality, 91% of which were Croats. The villages and their corresponding populations were:

- Amatovci, uninhabited
- Bogdašić, uninhabited
- Bolomače, population 22
- Boričevci, population 121
- Brestovac, population 670
- Busnovi, population 104
- Crljenci, population 12
- Čečavac, population 3
- Čečavački Vučjak, population 23
- Daranovci, population 183
- Deževci, population 157
- Dolac, population 203
- Donji Gučani, population 107
- Gornji Gučani, population 53
- Ivandol, population 139
- Jaguplije, population 137
- Jeminovac, population 7
- Kamenska, uninhabited
- Kamenski Šeovci, uninhabited
- Kamenski Vučjak, population 6
- Koprivna, population 7
- Kruševo, uninhabited
- Kujnik, population 22
- Mihajlije, uninhabited
- Mijači, population 18
- Mrkoplje, uninhabited
- Novo Zvečevo, population 30
- Nurkovac, population 244
- Oblakovac, population 5
- Orljavac, population 167
- Pasikovci, population 22
- Pavlovci, population 190
- Perenci, population 42
- Podsreće, population 34
- Požeški Brđani, population 66
- Rasna, population 7
- Ruševac, population 2
- Sažije, population 15
- Skenderovci, population 187
- Sloboština, population 18
- Striježevica, population 9
- Šnjegavić, population 20
- Šušnjari, uninhabited
- Vilić Selo, population 157
- Vranić, uninhabited
- Zakorenje, population 187
- Završje, population 323
- Žigerovci, population 7

== Climate ==
Since records began in 1981, the coldest temperature at the Belje station was −26.0 °C (−14.8 °F), on 9 February 2012.

== Politics ==
=== Minority councils ===
Directly elected minority councils and representatives are tasked with consulting tasks for the local or regional authorities in which they are advocating for minority rights and interests, integration into public life and participation in the management of local affairs. At the 2023 Croatian national minorities councils and representatives elections Serbs of Croatia fulfilled legal requirements to elect 10 members minority council of the Municipality of Brestovac.

== See also ==
- Monument to the victory of the people of Slavonia
