= Gornji Vrhovci =

Coordinates: 45°28′26″N 17°34′08″E

- Village
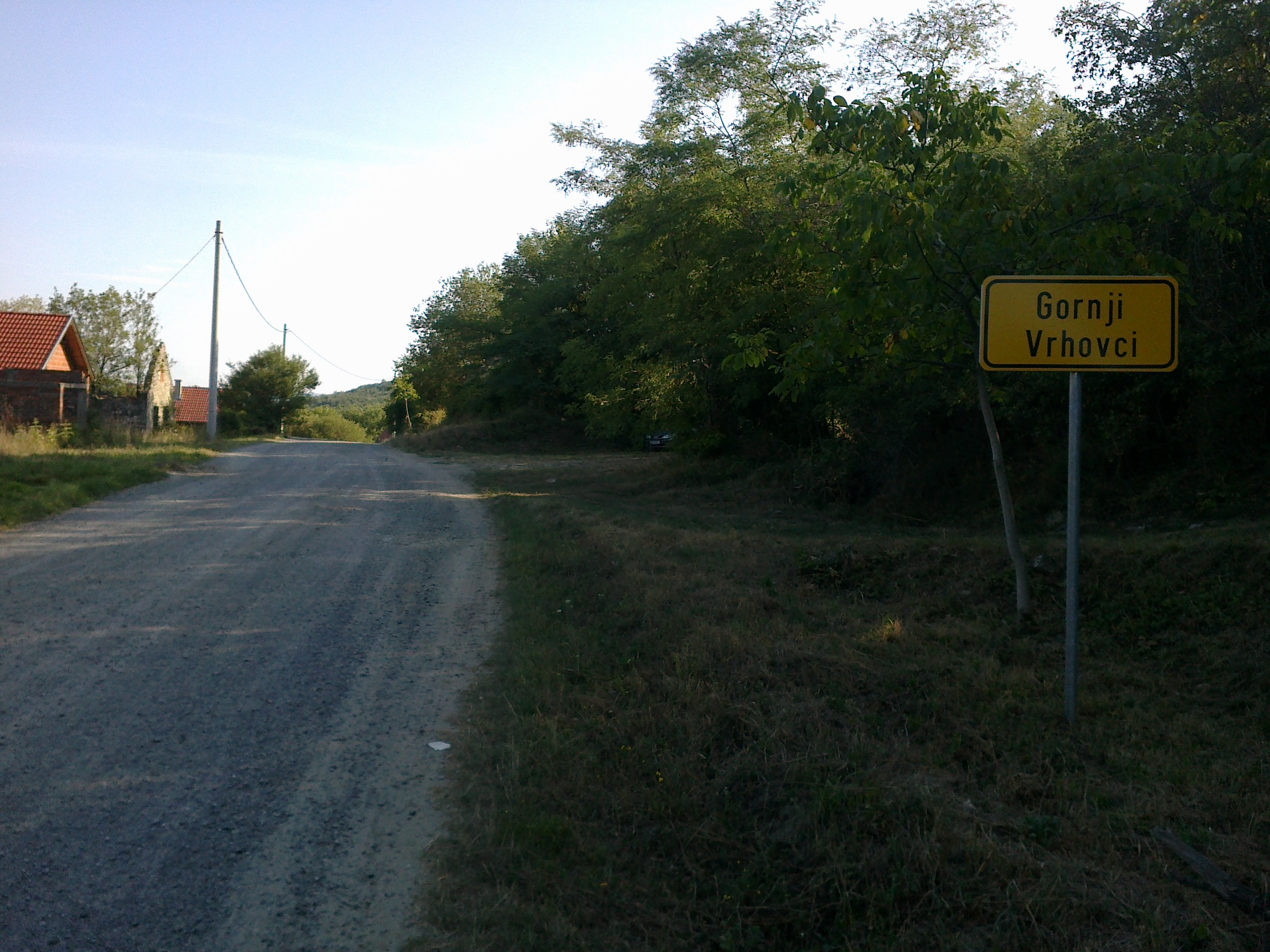
- Interactive map of Gornji Vrhovci
- Country: Croatia
- County: Požega-Slavonia County

Area
  - Total: 15.1 km^{2} (5.8 sq mi)

Population (2021)
  - Total: 8
  - Density: 0.53/km^{2} (1.4/sq mi)
- Time zone: UTC+1 (CET)
  - Summer (DST): UTC+2 (CEST)

Gornji Vrhovci is a village in Croatia.
