= Nagyharsány =

- Location of Baranya county in Hungary

- Location of Nagyharsány
- Coordinates: 45.84689°N 18.39770°E
- Country: Hungary
- County: Baranya

Area
  - Total: 26.01 km^{2} (10.04 sq mi)

Population (2004)
  - Total: 1,663
  - Density: 63.93/km^{2} (165.6/sq mi)
- Time zone: UTC+1 (CET)
  - Summer (DST): UTC+2 (CEST)
- Postal code: 7822
- Area code: 72

Nagyharsány (Croatian: Aršanj, German: Harschan) is a village in Baranya county, Hungary, near to the Croatian border.

== The dispute of Nagyharsány ==
In 1574 there was a religious dispute in Nagyharsány between the Unitarian preacher, György Alvinczi, and the followers of Calvinism. Alvinczi was condemned to death and killed by his opponents.

The Ottoman authorities wanted to punish the Calvinist community for this deed, and sentenced those guilty to death. In a gesture of compassion, György Válaszúti, the Unitarian preacher of Pécs begged for their pardon - and the Beylerbey of Buda agreed to have them set free.

Until the end of World War II, the inhabitants were Danube Swabians. Most of the former German settlers were expelled to Germany and Austria in 1945–1948, about the Potsdam Agreement.

== Gallery ==
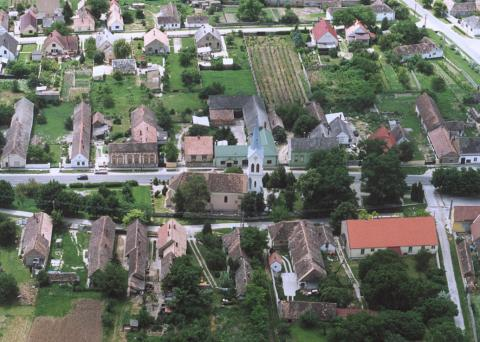

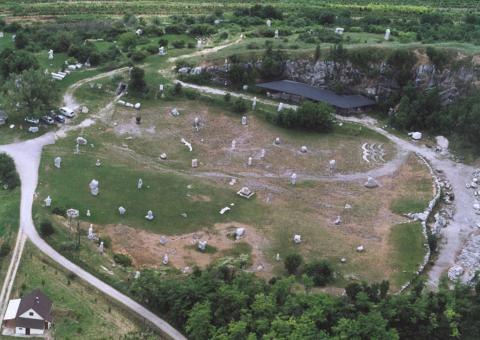

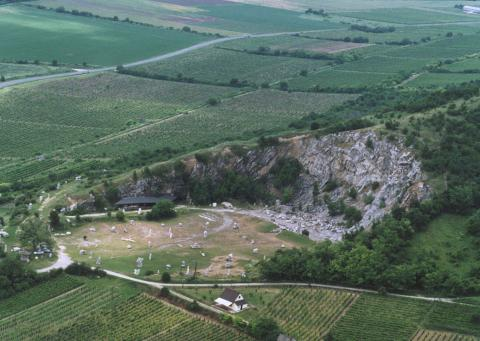
