= Kuzmica =

- Village
- Location within Croatia
- Coordinates: 45°19′38″N 17°45′16″E
- Country: Croatia
- Region: Slavonia
- County: Požega-Slavonia County
- City: Pleternica

Area
  - Total: 2.9 km^{2} (1.1 sq mi)
- Elevation: 132 m (433 ft)

Population (2021)
  - Total: 369
  - Density: 130/km^{2} (330/sq mi)
- Time zone: UTC+1 (CET)
  - Summer (DST): UTC+2 (CEST)
- Postal code: 34311
- Area code: 034

Kuzmica is a village in Požega-Slavonia County, Croatia. The village is administered as a part of the City of Pleternica. According to national census of 2011, population of the village is 525. The village is connected by the D38 state road.
