= Kruševo, Požega-Slavonia County =

Kruševo
- Village
- Location within Croatia
- Coordinates: 45°28′N 17°32′E
- Country: Croatia

Area
  - Total: 3.2 km^{2} (1.2 sq mi)

Population (2021)
  - Total: 0
  - Density: 0.0/km^{2} (0.0/sq mi)
- Time zone: UTC+1 (CET)
  - Summer (DST): UTC+2 (CEST)

Kruševo is an uninhabited settlement in Croatia.
