= Kamenski Vučjak =

- Village
- Location within Croatia
- Coordinates: 45°29′17″N 17°31′52″E
- Country: Croatia
- Region: Slavonia
- County: Požega-Slavonia County
- Municipality: Brestovac

Area
  - Total: 11.4 km^{2} (4.4 sq mi)
- Elevation: 299 m (981 ft)

Population (2021)
  - Total: 1
  - Density: 0.088/km^{2} (0.23/sq mi)
- Time zone: UTC+1 (CET)
  - Summer (DST): UTC+2 (CEST)
- Postal code: 34320
- Area code: 034

Kamenski Vučjak is a village in Požega-Slavonia County, Croatia. The village is administered as a part of the Brestovac municipality. According to national census of 2001, population of the village is 5. The village is connected by the D69 state road.
