= Kondrić =

- Village (Selo)
- Location within Croatia
- Coordinates: 45°17′N 18°17′E
- Country: Croatia
- County: Osijek-Baranja County
- Municipality: Trnava, Osijek-Baranja County

Area
  - Total: 10.3 km^{2} (4.0 sq mi)

Population (2021)
  - Total: 178
  - Density: 17.3/km^{2} (44.8/sq mi)
- Time zone: UTC+1 (CET)
  - Summer (DST): UTC+2 (CEST)

Kondrić is a village in Croatia.
