= Donji Lipovac, Croatia =

Coordinates: 45°13′19″N 17°39′11″E

- Village
- Interactive map of Donji Lipovac, Croatia
- Country: Croatia
- County: Brod-Posavina County

Area
  - Total: 7.4 km^{2} (2.9 sq mi)

Population (2021)
  - Total: 184
  - Density: 25/km^{2} (64/sq mi)
- Time zone: UTC+1 (CET)
  - Summer (DST): UTC+2 (CEST)

Donji Lipovac, Croatia is a village in Croatia.
