= Granje, Croatia =

Granje
- Village
- Location within Croatia
- Coordinates: 45°21′29″N 17°45′50″E
- Country: Croatia
- Region: Slavonia
- County: Požega-Slavonia County
- Municipality: Jakšić

Area
  - Total: 1.9 km^{2} (0.73 sq mi)

Population (2021)
  - Total: 65
  - Density: 34/km^{2} (89/sq mi)
- Time zone: UTC+1 (CET)
  - Summer (DST): UTC+2 (CEST)
- Postal code: 34308
- Area code: 034

Granje is a village in Požega-Slavonia County, Croatia. The village is administered as a part of the Jakšić municipality. According to national census of 2011, population of the village is 108.
