= Striježevica, Bosnia and Herzegovina =

Striježevica Стријежевица
- Village
- Location within Republika Srpska Location within Bosnia and Herzegovina
- Coordinates: 44°40′38″N 18°07′26″E
- Country: Bosnia and Herzegovina
- Entity: Republika Srpska
- Municipality: Doboj

Area
  - Total: 15 km^{2} (5.8 sq mi)
  - Land: 15 km^{2} (5.8 sq mi)
- Elevation: 500 m (1,600 ft)
  - Density: 1/km^{2} (2.6/sq mi)
- 437
- Time zone: UTC+1 (CET)
  - Summer (DST): UTC+2 (CEST)

Striježevica (Cyrillic: Стријежевица) is a village in the municipality of Doboj, Republika Srpska, Bosnia and Herzegovina.
