= Orljavac =

- Village
- Location within Croatia
- Coordinates: 45°24′45″N 17°29′45″E
- Country: Croatia
- Region: Slavonia
- County: Požega-Slavonia County
- Municipality: Brestovac

Area
  - Total: 9.9 km^{2} (3.8 sq mi)
- Elevation: 223 m (732 ft)

Population (2021)
  - Total: 113
  - Density: 11/km^{2} (30/sq mi)
- Time zone: UTC+1 (CET)
  - Summer (DST): UTC+2 (CEST)
- Postal code: 34320
- Area code: 034

Orljavac is a village in Požega-Slavonia County, Croatia. The village is administered as a part of the Brestovac municipality. According to national census of 2011, population of the village is 167. The village is connected by the D38 state road.
