= Mijači =

- Village
- Location within Croatia
- Coordinates: 45°26′49″N 17°28′14″E
- Country: Croatia
- County: Požega-Slavonia County
- Municipality: Brestovac

Area
  - Total: 8.5 km^{2} (3.3 sq mi)
- Elevation: 246 m (807 ft)

Population (2021)
  - Total: 10
  - Density: 1.2/km^{2} (3.0/sq mi)
- Time zone: UTC+1 (CET)
  - Summer (DST): UTC+2 (CEST)
- Postal code: 34320
- Area code: 034

Mijači (Serbian Cyrillic: Мијачи) is a village in the Brestovac municipality of the Požega-Slavonia County, Croatia. According to the 2001 census, there were 18 inhabitants in the village. The village is connected by the D38 state road.

== History ==
The village was known as Mihači until 1900.

During the World War II in Yugoslavia, in 1943, the Yugoslav Partisans formed the 18th National Liberation Brigade in the village, in which the fighters of the 1st and 2nd Slavonian NOP Units, including the whole 2nd Band of the 2nd Battalion of the 2nd NOP Unit were joined. In 1944, the Croatian fascist Ustaše had set up camp in the village, with 45 soldiers, and the Partisan Ljubuški battalion had driven them out after an hour.

In the prelude of the Croatian War, the village was part of the SAO Western Slavonia, and subsequently the Republic of Serbian Krajina.

Demographic history
Ethnic group	1948	1953	1961	1971	1981	1991	2001
Serbs						76 (78,35%)	
Croats						5 (5,15%)	
Others						16 (16,49%)	
Total	224	206	207	163	126	97	18

- 1857: 115
- 1869: 130
- 1880: 166
- 1890: 133
- 1900: 172
- 1910: 371
- 1921: 205
- 1931: 281
