= Bodovaljci =

Village in Croatia

- Village
- Interactive map of Bodovaljci
- Coordinates: 45°11′58″N 17°26′39″E
- Country: Croatia
- County: Brod-Posavina County

Population (2011)
  - Total: 552

Bodovaljci is a village near Vrbje, Croatia. In the 2011 census, it had 552 inhabitants.
