= Vetovo, Croatia =

Vetovo
- Village
- Location within Croatia
- Coordinates: 45°25′00″N 17°47′26″E
- Country: Croatia
- Region: Slavonia
- County: Požega-Slavonia County
- City: Kutjevo

Area
  - Total: 23.2 km^{2} (9.0 sq mi)
- Elevation: 218 m (715 ft)

Population (2021)
  - Total: 757
  - Density: 32.6/km^{2} (84.5/sq mi)
- Time zone: UTC+1 (CET)
  - Summer (DST): UTC+2 (CEST)
- Postal code: 34335
- Area code: 034

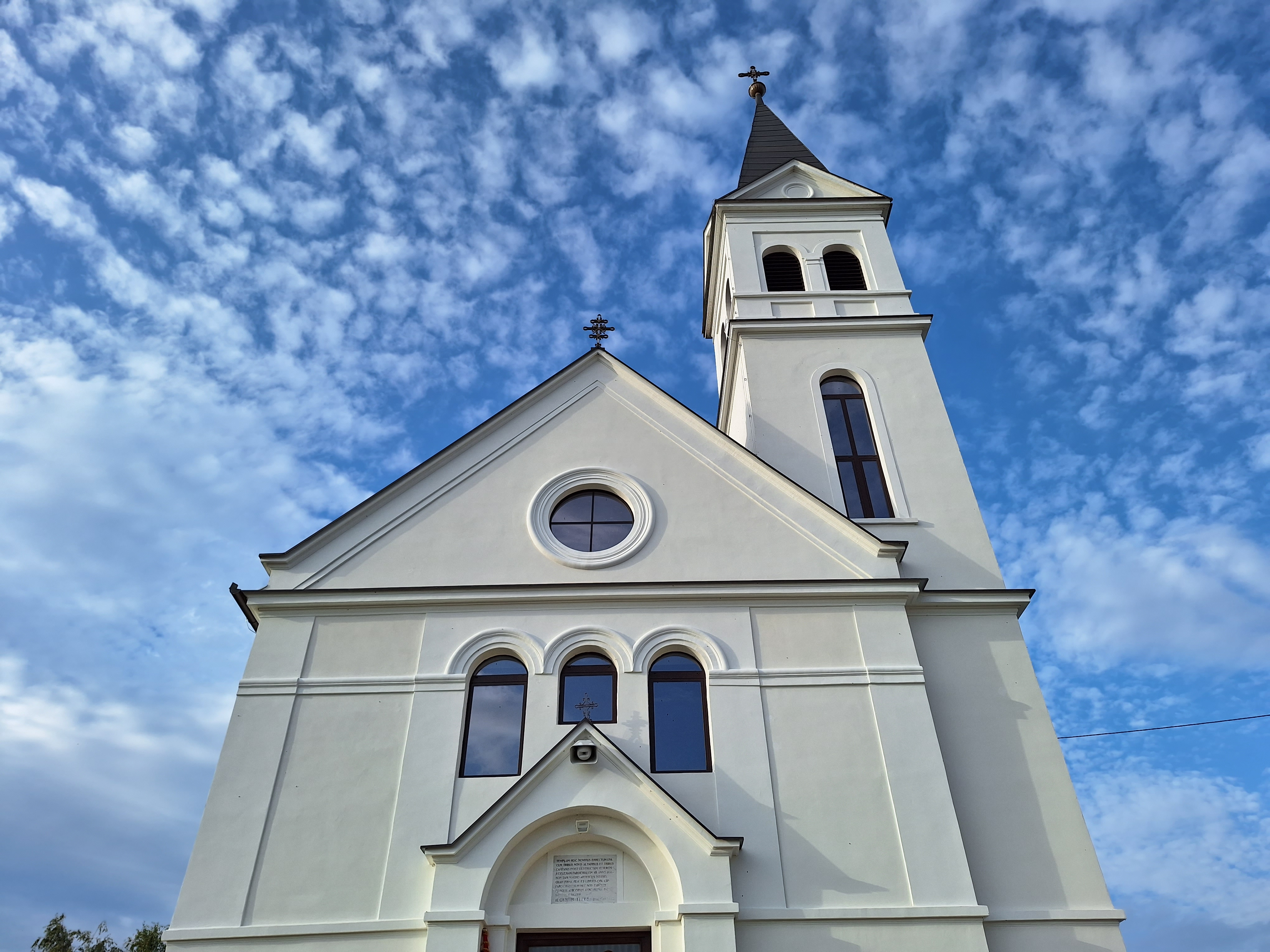
Vetovo’s Church of the Immaculate Conception of the Blessed Virgin Mary

Vetovo is a village in Požega-Slavonia County, Croatia. The village is administered as a part of the city of Kutjevo. According to national census of 2011, population of the village is 988.
