= Podvrško =

Coordinates: 45°22′N 17°26′E

- Village
- Interactive map of Podvrško
- Country: Croatia
- County: Brod-Posavina County
- Municipality: Cernik

Area
  - Total: 21.6 km^{2} (8.3 sq mi)

Population (2021)
  - Total: 230
  - Density: 11/km^{2} (28/sq mi)
- Time zone: UTC+1 (CET)
  - Summer (DST): UTC+2 (CEST)

Podvrško is a village in the municipality of Cernik in the west part of Brod-Posavina County.
