= Striježevica, Croatia =

Striježevica
- Village
- Location within Croatia
- Coordinates: 45°28′07″N 17°30′21″E
- Country: Croatia
- Region: Slavonia
- County: Požega-Slavonia County
- Municipality: Brestovac

Area
  - Total: 2.1 km^{2} (0.81 sq mi)
- Elevation: 272 m (892 ft)

Population (2021)
  - Total: 3
  - Density: 1.4/km^{2} (3.7/sq mi)
- Time zone: UTC+1 (CET)
  - Summer (DST): UTC+2 (CEST)
- Postal code: 34320
- Area code: 034

Striježevica is a village in Požega-Slavonia County, Croatia. The village is administered as a part of the Brestovac municipality. According to national census of 2001, population of the village is 7. The village is connected by the D69 state road.

== Notable people ==
- Sonja Marinković, decorated with the Order of the People's Hero
