= Ruševo =

- Village
- Location within Croatia
- Coordinates: 45°18′35″N 17°59′43″E
- Country: Croatia
- Region: Slavonia
- County: Požega-Slavonia County
- Municipality: Čaglin

Area
  - Total: 18.0 km^{2} (6.9 sq mi)
- Elevation: 171 m (561 ft)

Population (2021)
  - Total: 182
  - Density: 10.1/km^{2} (26.2/sq mi)
- Time zone: UTC+1 (CET)
  - Summer (DST): UTC+2 (CEST)
- Postal code: 34350
- Area code: 034

Ruševo is a village in Požega-Slavonia County, Croatia.

== Background ==
The village is administered as a part of the Čaglin municipality. According to national census of 2011, population of the village is 310. The village is connected by the D38 state road.

== Bibliography ==
=== Biology ===
- Šašić, Martina; Nahirnić, Ana; Tarmann, Gerhard M. (2016-12-31). "Zygaenidae (Lepidoptera) in the Lepidoptera collections of the Croatian Natural History Museum". Natura Croatica: Periodicum Musei Historiae Naturalis Croatici. 25 (2): 233–248. doi:10.20302/NC.2016.25.19. eISSN 1848-7386.
