= Nurkovac =

- Village
- Location within Croatia
- Coordinates: 45°19′46″N 17°36′37″E
- Country: Croatia
- Region: Slavonia
- County: Požega-Slavonia County
- Municipality: Brestovac

Area
  - Total: 5.7 km^{2} (2.2 sq mi)
- Elevation: 158 m (518 ft)

Population (2021)
  - Total: 185
  - Density: 32/km^{2} (84/sq mi)
- Time zone: UTC+1 (CET)
  - Summer (DST): UTC+2 (CEST)
- Postal code: 34322
- Area code: 034

Nurkovac is a village in Požega-Slavonia County, Croatia. The village is administered as a part of the Brestovac municipality. According to national census of 2011, population of the village is 244. The village is connected by the D51 state road.
