= Migalovci =

- Location within Croatia
- Coordinates: 45.332°N 18.004°E
- Country: Croatia
- County: Požega-Slavonia
- Municipality: Čaglin

Area
  - Total: 7.4 km^{2} (2.9 sq mi)

Population (2021)
  - Total: 92
  - Density: 12/km^{2} (32/sq mi)
- Time zone: UTC+1 (CET)
  - Summer (DST): UTC+2 (CEST)

Migalovci is a settlement in the municipality of Čaglin, Pozega-Slavonia County, Croatia. It has 129 inhabitants (2011).
