= Završje, Požega-Slavonia County =

Završje
- Village
- Location within Croatia
- Coordinates: 45°19′39″N 17°37′46″E
- Country: Croatia
- Region: Slavonia
- County: Požega-Slavonia County
- Municipality: Brestovac

Area
  - Total: 1.6 km^{2} (0.62 sq mi)
- Elevation: 155 m (509 ft)

Population (2021)
  - Total: 292
  - Density: 180/km^{2} (470/sq mi)
- Time zone: UTC+1 (CET)
  - Summer (DST): UTC+2 (CEST)
- Postal code: 34322
- Area code: 034

Završje is a village in Požega-Slavonia County, Croatia. It is administered as a part of the Brestovac municipality. Its population was 323 at the national census of 2011.
