= Jakšić, Croatia =

Jakšić
- Municipality
- Općina Jakšić; Municipality of Jakšić
- Location within Croatia
- Coordinates: 45.358°N 17.6388°E
- Country: Croatia
- Region: Slavonia (Požega Valley)
- County: Požega-Slavonia County

Area
  - Municipality: 43.4 km^{2} (16.8 sq mi)
  - Urban: 11.7 km^{2} (4.5 sq mi)

Population (2021)
  - Municipality: 3,371
  - Density: 77.7/km^{2} (201/sq mi)
  - Urban: 1,566
  - Urban density: 134/km^{2} (347/sq mi)
- Time zone: UTC+1 (Central European Time)
- Vehicle registration: PŽ
- Website: jaksic.hr

Jakšić is a town and a municipality in Slavonia, Croatia.

It is located in the middle of the Požega Valley.

== Name ==
Among others, the Jakšići were a Serbian noble family in the 15th and 16th centuries.

Jakšići is also the name of a village and municipality in Gorski Kotar, a hamlet of Blatuša, a hamlet of Cerova, a hamlet of Donji Velemerić, a hamlet of Glogovo, a hamlet of Gornja Trstenica, a hamlet of Panjak, a hamlet of Pecka, a hamlet of Slani Potok, a hamlet of Slunjski Moravci, upper and lower hamlets of Jezero, and upper and lower hamlets of Sokolac. Aside from streets in the above settlements, it is also the name of a street in Karlovac.

== Population ==
The total population of the municipality was 4,058 in 2011, in the following settlements:

- Bertelovci, population 151
- Cerovac, population 228
- Eminovci, population 640
- Granje, population 91
- Jakšić, population 1,877
- Radnovac, population 203
- Rajsavac, population 313
- Svetinja, population 67
- Tekić, population 231
- Treštanovci, population 257

In the same census, 93.5% were Croats.

Colonist settlements of Brijest and Treštanovci were established on the territory of the village municipality during the land reform in interwar Yugoslavia.

Older sources refer to the village as "Jakšići" (plural of Jakšić).

== Culture ==
=== In popular culture ===
In late November 2022 the village attracted regional media attention when local resident was reported to police by his neighbour and with the Croatian Police subsequently submitting an indictment proposal for "insulting the moral feelings of citizens" for rising of the flag of Yugoslavia on the private home on the anniversary of the former Yugoslav Republic Day. Some lawyers criticized the decision of the Police arguing that the Yugoslav flag as such is not a forbidden symbol while the legal provision for "insulting the moral feelings of citizens" was from a dated 1977 law prescribing 50-200 Deutsche Mark fine.

== Politics ==
=== Minority councils ===
Directly elected minority councils and representatives are tasked with consulting tasks for the local or regional authorities in which they are advocating for minority rights and interests, integration into public life and participation in the management of local affairs. At the 2023 Croatian national minorities councils and representatives elections Serbs of Croatia fulfilled legal requirements to elect 10 members minority council of the Municipality of Jakšić with 9 candidates being elected in the end.
