= Trnjanski Kuti =

Coordinates: 45°07′N 18°10′E

- Village
- Interactive map of Trnjanski Kuti
- Country: Croatia
- County: Brod-Posavina County

Area
  - Total: 8.2 km^{2} (3.2 sq mi)

Population (2021)
  - Total: 284
  - Density: 35/km^{2} (90/sq mi)
- Time zone: UTC+1 (CET)
  - Summer (DST): UTC+2 (CEST)

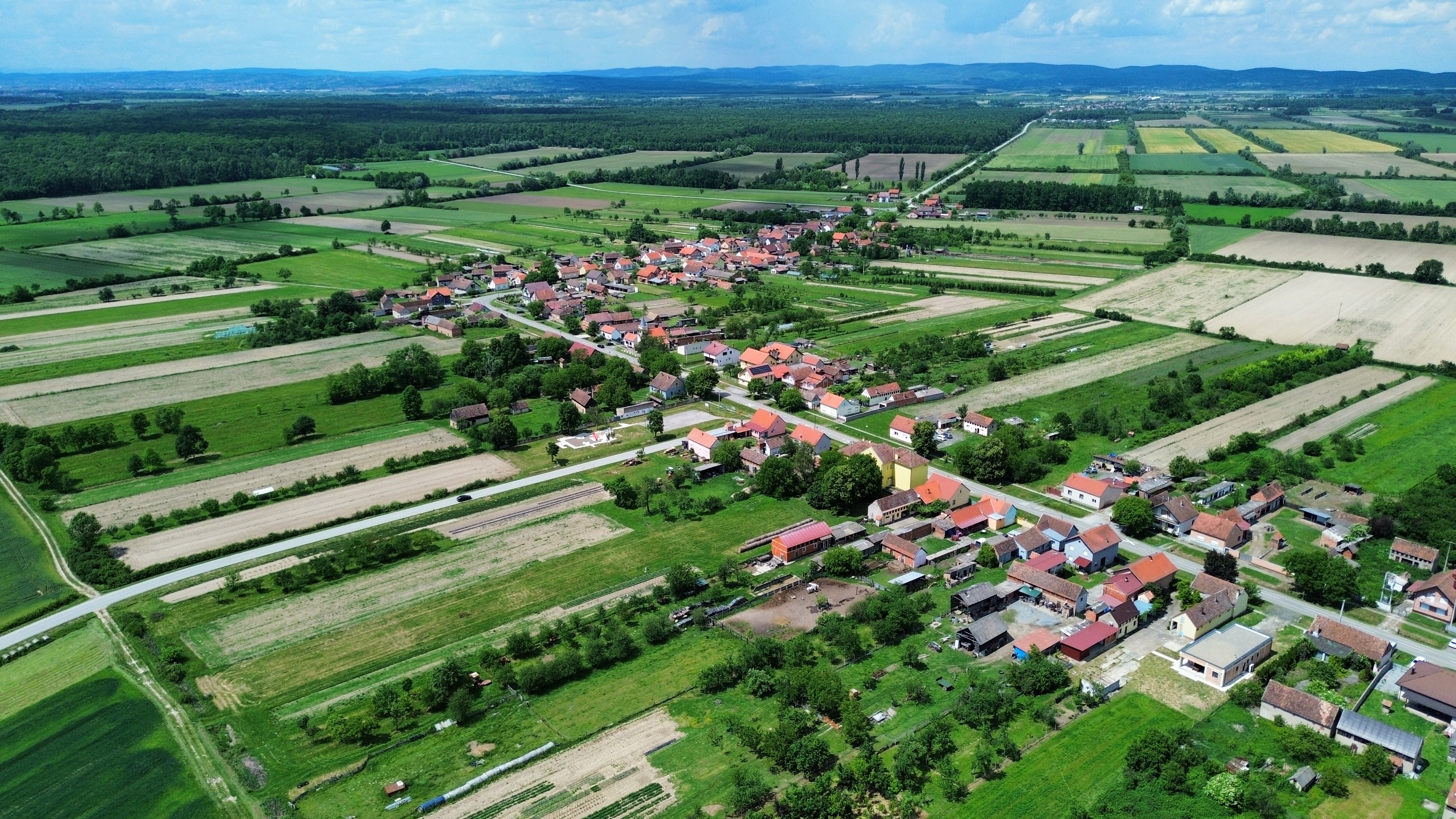

Trnjanski Kuti is a village in Croatia.
