= Čaglin =

- Municipality
- Interactive map of Čaglin
- Location of Čaglin in Croatia
- Coordinates: 45°21′00″N 17°59′18″E
- Country: Croatia
- Region: Slavonia (Požega Valley)
- County: Požega-Slavonia County

Area
  - Municipality: 178.2 km^{2} (68.8 sq mi)
  - Urban: 8.4 km^{2} (3.2 sq mi)

Population (2021)
  - Municipality: 2,111
  - Density: 11.85/km^{2} (30.68/sq mi)
  - Urban: 478
  - Urban density: 57/km^{2} (150/sq mi)
- Website: opcina-caglin.hr

Čaglin is a village and a municipality in Slavonia, Croatia. The population of the municipality was 2122 in 2021.

In the 2011 census, the municipality consisted of the following settlements:

- Čaglin, population 591
- Darkovac, population 16
- Djedina Rijeka, population 129
- Dobra Voda, population 16
- Dobrogošće, population 12
- Draganlug, population 3
- Duboka, population 64
- Imrijevci, population 29
- Ivanovci, population 20
- Jasik, population 2
- Jezero, population 8
- Jurkovac, population 21
- Kneževac, population 89
- Latinovac, population 68
- Migalovci, population 129
- Milanlug, population 200
- Mokreš, population 20
- Nova Lipovica, population 37
- Nova Ljeskovica, population 486
- Novi Zdenkovac, population 10
- Paka, population 33
- Ruševo, population 265
- Sapna, population 77
- Sibokovac, population 36
- Sovski Dol, population 121
- Stara Ljeskovica, population 7
- Stari Zdenkovac, population 33
- Stojčinovac, population 4
- Veliki Bilač, population 36
- Vlatkovac, population 85
- Vukojevica, population 76

== Politics ==
=== Minority councils ===
Directly elected minority councils and representatives are tasked with consulting tasks for the local or regional authorities in which they are advocating for minority rights and interests, integration into public life and participation in the management of local affairs. At the 2023 Croatian national minorities councils and representatives elections Serbs of Croatia fulfilled legal requirements to elect 10 members minority council of the Municipality of Čaglin.
