= Rešetari =

- Municipality
- Interactive map of Rešetari
- Location within Croatia
- Coordinates: 45.15°N 17.27°E
- Country: Croatia
- County: Brod-Posavina County

Government
  - Mayor: Zlatko Aga (HSLS)

Area
  - Municipality: 59.2 km^{2} (22.9 sq mi)
  - Urban: 21.1 km^{2} (8.1 sq mi)

Population (2021)
  - Municipality: 3,852
  - Density: 65.1/km^{2} (169/sq mi)
  - Urban: 2,072
  - Urban density: 98.2/km^{2} (254/sq mi)
- Postal code: 35400 Nova Gradiška
- Website: resetari.hr

Rešetari is a village and a municipality in Brod-Posavina County, Croatia.

== Demographics ==
In 2021, the municipality had 3,852 residents in the following 7 settlements:

- Adžamovci, population 446
- Brđani, population 202
- Bukovica, population 130
- Drežnik, population 316
- Gunjavci, population 355
- Rešetari, population 2,072
- Zapolje, population 331
Rešetari: Population trends 1857–2021
v

| population | 1949 | 2096 | 2133 | 2645 | 3114 | 3879 | 3581 | 4069 | 4825 | 4946 | 5137 | 5447 | 5283 | 5627 | 5171 | 4753 | 3852 |
| | 1857 | 1869 | 1880 | 1890 | 1900 | 1910 | 1921 | 1931 | 1948 | 1953 | 1961 | 1971 | 1981 | 1991 | 2001 | 2011 | 2021 |

Sources: Croatian Bureau of Statistics publications

In the 2011 census, the absolute majority were Croats.
