= Trnava, Osijek-Baranja County =

Trnava
- Municipality
- Location in Croatia Trnava (Croatia)
- Coordinates: 45.26°N 18.25°E
- Country: Croatia
- Region: Slavonia
- County: Osijek-Baranja County

Government
  - Mayor: Irena Mikić Brezina

Area
  - Municipality: 82.0 km^{2} (31.7 sq mi)
  - Urban: 17.1 km^{2} (6.6 sq mi)

Population (2021)
  - Municipality: 1,251
  - Density: 15.3/km^{2} (39.5/sq mi)
  - Urban: 524
  - Urban density: 30.6/km^{2} (79.4/sq mi)
- Time zone: UTC+1 (Central European Time)
- Website: opcina-trnava.hr

Trnava (Serbian Cyrillic: Трнава, German: Tirnau) is a village and a municipality in Osijek-Baranja County, Croatia.

In the 2011 Croatian census, it had a total of 1,600 inhabitants, in the following settlements:

- Dragotin, population 254
- Hrkanovci Đakovački, population 136
- Kondrić, population 230
- Lapovci, population 280
- Svetoblažje, population 70
- Trnava, population 630

In the same census, 90% of the population were Croats.

Colonist settlement of Hrkanovci was established on the territory of the village municipality during the land reform in interwar Yugoslavia.

== Politics ==
=== Minority councils ===
Directly elected minority councils and representatives are tasked with consulting the local or regional authorities to advocate for minority rights and interests, integration into public life and participation in the management of local affairs. At the 2023 Croatian national minorities councils and representatives elections, Serbs of Croatia fulfilled the legal requirements to elect 10 members municipal minority councils of the Trnava Municipality but the elections were not held due to the lack of candidates.
