= Opatovac, Brod-Posavina County =

Coordinates: 45°19′46″N 17°25′59″E

Opatovac
- Village
- Interactive map of Opatovac
- Country: Croatia
- County: Brod-Posavina County
- Municipality: Cernik

Area
  - Total: 8.5 km^{2} (3.3 sq mi)

Population (2021)
  - Total: 282
  - Density: 33/km^{2} (86/sq mi)
- Time zone: UTC+1 (CET)
  - Summer (DST): UTC+2 (CEST)

Opatovac is a village in Croatia.
