= Baćin Dol =

- Village
- Location within Croatia
- Coordinates: 45°18′22″N 17°25′52″E
- Country: Croatia
- County: Brod-Posavina County

Area
  - Total: 10.1 km^{2} (3.9 sq mi)

Population (2021)
  - Total: 302
  - Density: 29.9/km^{2} (77.4/sq mi)
- Time zone: UTC+1 (CET)
  - Summer (DST): UTC+2 (CEST)

Baćindol is a village in Croatia.

== History ==
The medieval fortress of Gračanica is located on the tree-covered, 319 meter-high hill above the village. The fortress was constructed between the 13th and 14th centuries. In the 16th century it was conquered by the Ottoman forces. Traces of two other fortresses, lacking historical data on their usage, are also visible in the hills around the village.

In 1849 the local Roman Catholic chapel was erected while its bell was completed in 1902. In 1998 it was reconstructed and some of the stones used were taken from the site of the medieval fortress of Gračanica.
