= Kutjevo =

- Town
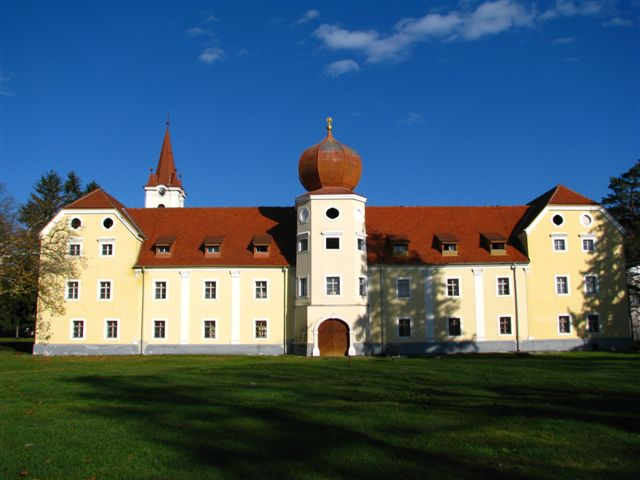
- Kutjevo Abbey

- Location of Kutjevo in Croatia
- Coordinates: 45.42°N 17.88°E
- Country: Croatia
- Region: Slavonia (Požega Valley)
- County: Požega-Slavonia County

Government
  - Mayor: Josip Budimir (HDZ)

Area
  - Town: 174.0 km^{2} (67.2 sq mi)
  - Urban: 44.7 km^{2} (17.3 sq mi)

Population (2021)
  - Town: 4,870
  - Density: 28.0/km^{2} (72.5/sq mi)
  - Urban: 1,941
  - Urban density: 43.4/km^{2} (112/sq mi)
- Time zone: UTC+1 (Central European Time)
- Website: kutjevo.hr

Kutjevo is a town in eastern Croatia. It is located in the Slavonia region, northeast of town of Požega.

== Climate ==
Since records began in 2002, the highest temperature recorded at the Vidim weather station was 39.1 °C (102.4 °F), on 22 August 2018. The coldest temperature was −22.5 °C (−8.5 °F), on 13 January 2003.

Between 2003 and 2013, the highest temperature recorded at the Mitrovac weather station was 39.0 °C (102.2 °F), on 20 August 2007. The coldest temperature was −17.9 °C (−0.2 °F), on 7 February 2005.

== History ==
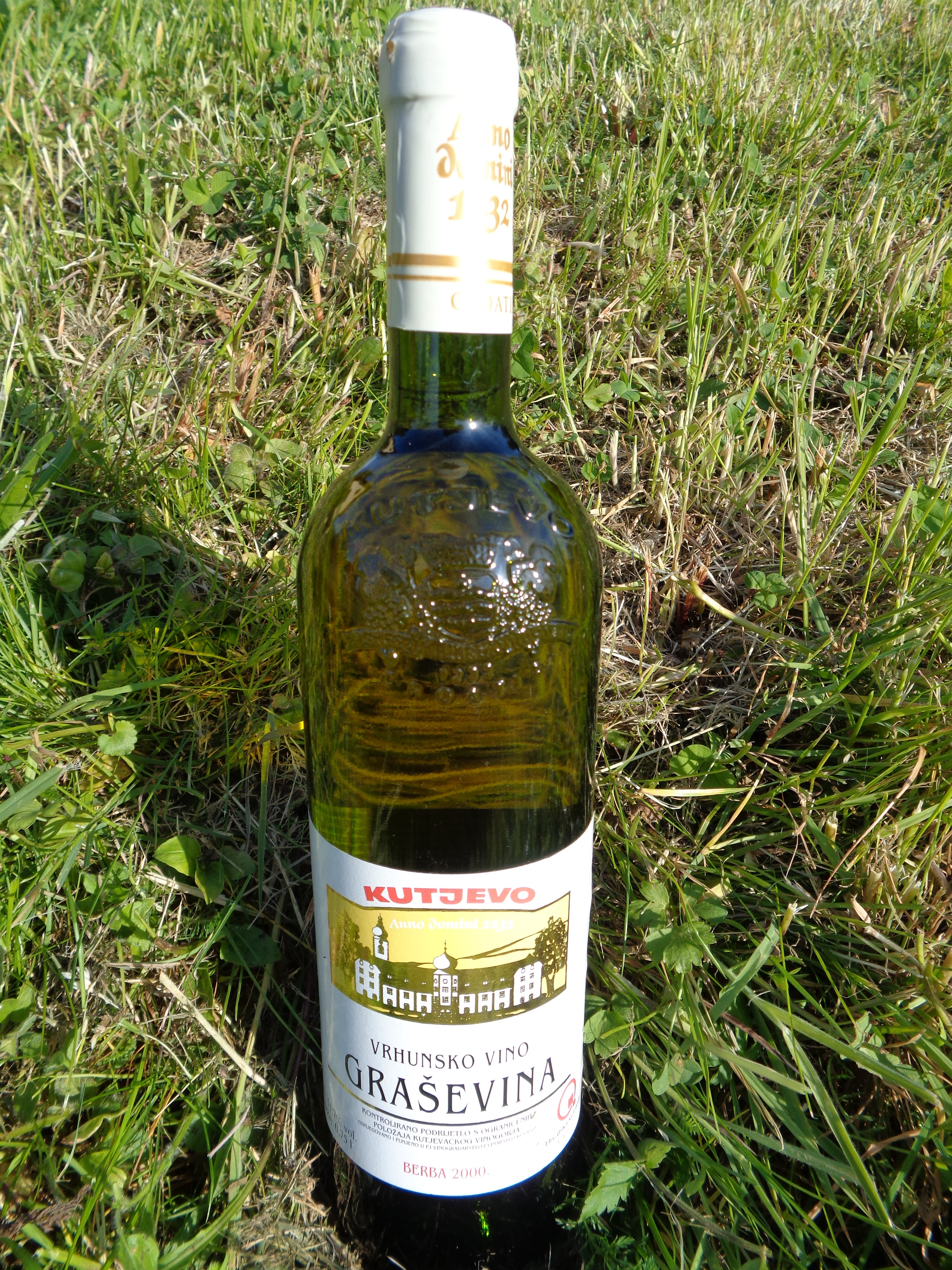
A bottle of Graševina (Welschriesling) white wine from Kutjevo

Kutjevo is known for its wines, and the local agricultural joint stock company Kutjevo d.d. is the largest exporter of wines in Croatia. There are numerous winegrowers residing in Kutjevo, like Enjingi and Krauthaker.

The DVD Kutjevo was founded in 1850.

== Population ==
The 2011 census showed there were 6,247 people in the municipality and 2,440 in the town itself, with 95% of the population declaring themselves Croats.

Town of Kutjevo: Population trends 1857–2021
v

population	5065	4965	5085	6005	7158	7812	7583	8150	7464	7869	7941	7817	7420	7366	7472	6247	4870
	1857	1869	1880	1890	1900	1910	1921	1931	1948	1953	1961	1971	1981	1991	2001	2011	2021

Sources: Croatian Bureau of Statistics publications

== Politics ==
=== Minority councils ===
Directly elected minority councils and representatives are tasked with consulting tasks for the local or regional authorities in which they are advocating for minority rights and interests, integration into public life and participation in the management of local affairs. At the 2023 Croatian national minorities councils and representatives elections Serbs of Croatia fulfilled legal requirements to elect 15 members minority council of the Town of Kutjevo but the elections were not held due to the lack of candidates.

== Settlements ==
The settlements included in the administrative area of Kutjevo include:

- Bektež, population 388
- Bjeliševac, population 112
- Ciglenik, population 143
- Ferovac, population 103
- Grabarje, population 490
- Gradište, population 152
- Rnjevac, population 174
- Kula, population 331
- Kutjevo, population 2,440
- Lukač, population 150
- Mitrovac, population 133
- Ovčare, population 123
- Poreč, population 119
- Šumanovci, population 139
- Tominovac, population 164
- Venje, population 98
- Vetovo, population 988

The colonist settlement of Poreč was established on the territory of the present-day municipality (then Bektež municipality) during the land reform in interwar Yugoslavia.

== See also ==
- Turković family

== Bibliography ==
=== General ===
- Obad Šćitaroci, Mladen; Bojanić Obad Šćitaroci, Bojana; Dundović, Boris (2013). "Manors and Gardens in Northern Croatia in the Age of Historicism" (PDF). Centropa. pp. 175–186. ISSN 1532-5563. Archived from the original (PDF) on 2025-05-05.

=== Biology ===
- Šašić, Martina; Nahirnić, Ana; Tarmann, Gerhard M. (2016-12-31). "Zygaenidae (Lepidoptera) in the Lepidoptera collections of the Croatian Natural History Museum". Natura Croatica: Periodicum Musei Historiae Naturalis Croatici. 25 (2): 233–248. doi:10.20302/NC.2016.25.19. eISSN 1848-7386.
