= Malino =

Malino may refer to:

- Malino, Indonesia, a town in Indonesia
- Malino, Russia, name of several inhabited localities in Russia
- Malino, Croatia, a village near Oriovac, Croatia
