= Josip Stanišić =

Croatian footballer (born 2000)

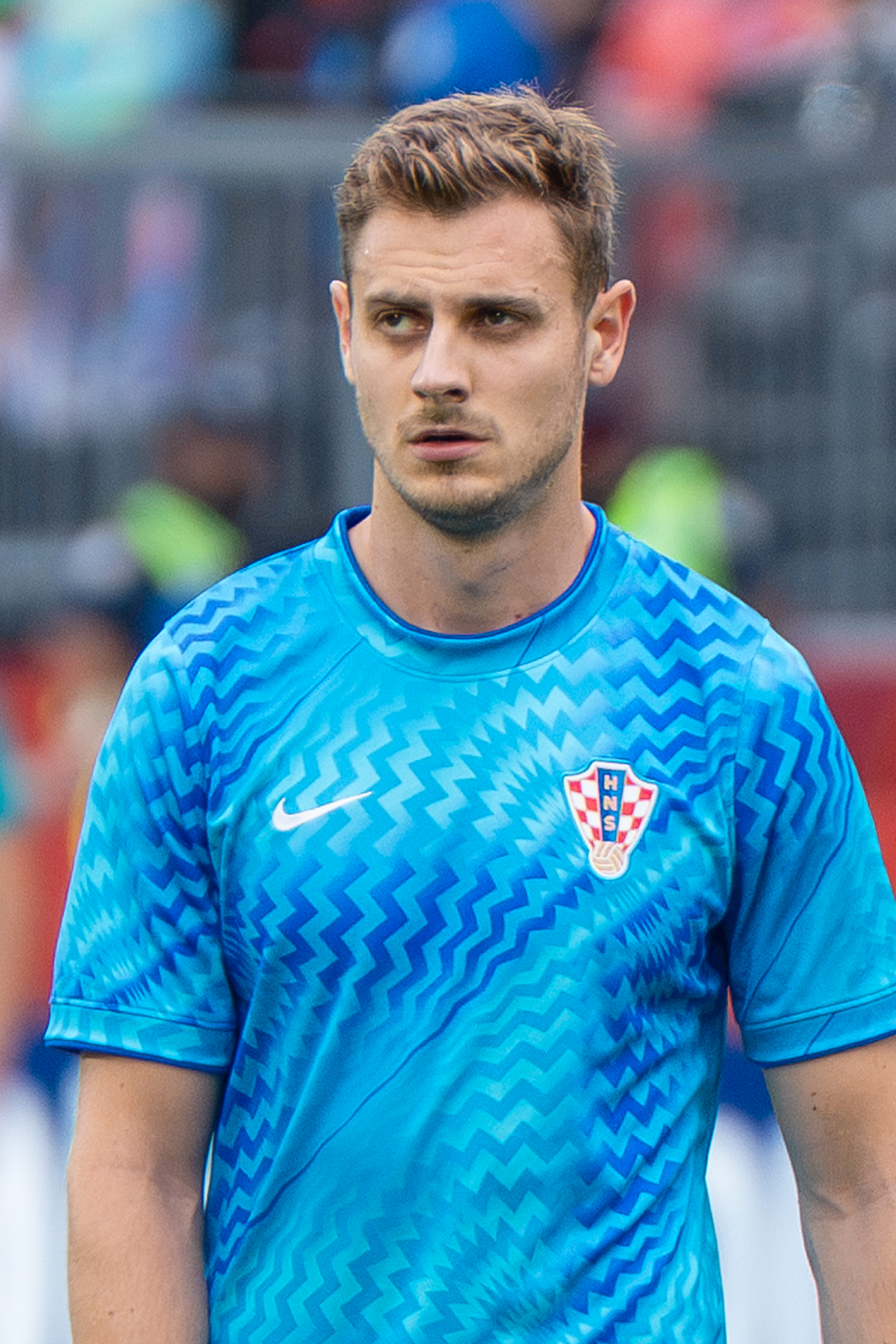
- Stanišić with Croatia in 2026

Personal information
- Full name: Josip Stanišić
- Date of birth: 2 April 2000 (age 26)
- Place of birth: Munich, Germany
- Height: 1.86 m (6 ft 1 in)
- Positions: Full-back; centre-back

Team information
- Current team: Bayern Munich
- Number: 44

Youth career
- FC Perlach 1925
- 2009–2015: 1860 Munich
- 2015–2017: SC Fürstenfeldbruck
- 2017–2019: Bayern Munich

Senior career*
Years	Team	Apps	(Gls)
2019–2021	Bayern Munich II	42	(0)
2021–	Bayern Munich	77	(3)
2023–2024	→ Bayer Leverkusen (loan)	20	(3)

International career^{‡}
2018	Germany U19	2	(0)
2022	Croatia U21	3	(0)
2021–	Croatia	40	(0)
Medal record
Men's football
Representing Croatia
FIFA World Cup
Third place	2022 Qatar
UEFA Nations League
Runner-up	2023 Netherlands
- * Club domestic league appearances and goals as of 21:25, 20 November 2026 (UTC) ‡ National team caps and goals as of 23:23, 15 November 2026 (UTC)

Josip Stanišić (Croatian pronunciation: [jǒsip stǎniʃitɕ]; born 2 April 2000) is a professional footballer who plays as a full-back for Bundesliga club Bayern Munich. Born in Germany, he plays for the Croatia national team.

== Club career ==
=== Early career ===
==== 1860 Munich ====
Stanišić already played in the youth teams for the then second division TSV 1860 Munich and stayed there until the summer of 2015.

==== SC Fürstenfeldbruck ====
As a 15-year-old, the change took place in front of the gates of the state capital in the U16s of the then sixth division SC Fürstenfeldbruck. With the club's younger B-Juniors, he was one of the top performers from the start and, as the second-best goalscorer in his team, contributed to the fact that the Bruckers were one of the two top teams in the B-Junior District League alongside 1. FC Garmisch-Partenkirchen. Already in May 2016, just turned 16, he was pulled up to the U17, in which he was also one of the top performers and with two goals in the remaining eight games of the season contributed to the U17 of SC Fürstenfeldbruck being promoted from the regional league to the state league, in the junior B division, the third highest division behind the Bundesliga and Bayernliga. The Croatian also had a regular place in the team in the regional league, which just missed the Bayern league at the end of the season.

==== Youth career at Bayern Munich ====
Stanisic was no longer there at this point, however, as FC Bayern Munich had noticed him in the meantime and signed him for their U17s in January 2017. Hardly in Munich, Stanišić suffered an ankle fracture in preparation for the second half of the season and was out for the rest of the season. So he missed winning the German B-Junior Championship.

In the summer of 2018, Stanišić played part of the season preparation with the professional team of Bayern Munich and was also used in two games in Klagenfurt and Philadelphia. However, Stanišić continued to play everyday life with the A-Juniors and was the new team captain there in his second season. In January he had to undergo a groin operation and was absent for several weeks. In that season, too, the team missed the final round of the German championship, with fourth place even quite clearly, and the two cup competitions again ended early.

He made his professional debut for Bayern Munich II in the 3. Liga on 26 July 2019, coming on as a substitute at half-time for Angelo Mayer in the home match against KFC Uerdingen, which finished as a 2–1 win.

=== Bayern Munich ===
Stanišić made his Bundesliga debut for Bayern Munich in a 1–1 draw with Union Berlin on 10 April 2021, being named in the starting lineup as a left back. On 1 July 2021, Stanišić signed a professional contract with Bayern until 2023. After impressing Bayern coach Julian Nagelsmann during the pre-season, Stanišić remained with the senior team, despite the original plan to be sent on loan to Heidenheim. He was named in the starting lineup as a right back on 13 August 2021, the first day of Bundesliga, as Bayern drew 1–1 with Borussia Mönchengladbach. Four days later, he was named in the starting lineup once again, as Bayern defeated Borussia Dortmund 3–1 to win the DFL-Supercup. On 14 September, Stanišić made his Champions League debut in a 3–0 victory over Barcelona, coming off the bench for Niklas Süle in the 82nd minute. On 15 October 2021, Stanišić extended his contract with Bayern until 2025.

On 14 May 2022, Stanišić scored his first goal for Bayern in a 2–2 draw with Wolfsburg. Later that year, on 12 November, he extended his contract with Bayern until 2026.

==== Loan to Bayer Leverkusen ====
On 20 August 2023, Stanišić joined fellow Bundesliga club Bayer Leverkusen on a one-year loan deal. On 10 February 2024, he scored his first goal for Leverkusen by scoring the first goal in a 3–0 victory over his parent club Bayern Munich. On 14 April, Bayer Leverkusen secured their first-ever Bundesliga title, in which he became the second player to win the competition with two different clubs in two consecutive seasons, following August Starek in 1968 and 1969. A week later, on 21 April, he scored a header in the 97th minute of stoppage time in a 1–1 away draw against Borussia Dortmund, to extend Leverkusen's unbeaten streak in all competitions. On 9 May, he scored another 97th-minute goal in a 2–2 draw against Roma in the Europa League semi-final second leg, qualifying his club to the final by winning 4–2 on aggregate, as well as prolonging his club's unbeaten streak to 49 matches, breaking the previous record set by Benfica between 1963 and 1965.

==== Return to Bayern Munich ====
On 27 June 2024, Stanišić extended his contract with Bayern until 2029. On 10 March 2026, he scored his first Champions League goal in a 6–1 away win over Atalanta in the first leg of the round of 16.

== International career ==
Stanišić holds both German and Croatian citizenships. Despite previously playing for Germany U19, Stanišić was called up to the Croatia U21 team by Igor Bišćan on 23 August 2021 for the upcoming UEFA Under-21 Euro 2023 qualifiers against Azerbaijan and Finland. However, he failed to make his debut due to an injury. Soon after, on 20 September, Stanišić was called up to the senior Croatia team by Zlatko Dalić for the upcoming 2022 FIFA World Cup qualifiers against Cyprus and Slovakia. He made his debut on 8 October in a 3–0 victory over the former opponent, being named in the starting lineup.

On 9 November 2022, Stanišić was named in Dalić's 26-man squad for the 2022 FIFA World Cup. He received no playtime until the 2–1 third place play-off victory over Morocco on 17 December, when he replaced the injured Josip Juranović in the starting lineup.

On 18 May 2026, Stanišić was selected in the 26-man squad for the 2026 FIFA World Cup.

== Personal life ==
Stanišić was born in Munich to Croat parents. His father Damir hails from Malino and his mother Sandra from Oriovac.

In January 2024, it was announced that Stanišić had become the father of a son.

== Career statistics ==
=== Club ===
As of match played 20 November 2026

Appearances and goals by club, season and competition
Club	Season	League			DFB-Pokal		Europe		Other		Total	
Club	Season	Division	Apps	Goals	Apps	Goals	Apps	Goals	Apps	Goals	Apps	Goals
Bayern Munich II	2019–20	3. Liga	18	0	—		—		—		18	0
Bayern Munich II	2020–21	3. Liga	24	0	—		—		—		24	0
Bayern Munich II	Total		42	0	—		—		—		42	0
Bayern Munich	2020–21	Bundesliga	1	0	0	0	0	0	0	0	1	0
Bayern Munich	2021–22	Bundesliga	13	1	1	0	2 (Note: Appearances in UEFA Champions League)	0	1 (Note: Appearance in DFL-/Franz Beckenbauer Supercup)	0	17	1
Bayern Munich	2022–23	Bundesliga	14	0	1	0	8	0	0	0	23	0
Bayern Munich	2024–25	Bundesliga	14	0	1	0	6	0	5 (Note: Appearances in FIFA Club World Cup)	0	26	0
Bayern Munich	2025–26	Bundesliga	26	2	6	0	10	1	1	0	43	3
Bayern Munich	2026–27	Bundesliga	9	0	2	0	4	0	1	0	16	0
Bayern Munich	Total		77	3	11	0	30	1	7	0	125	4
Bayer Leverkusen (loan)	2023–24	Bundesliga	20	3	5	0	13 (Note: Appearances in UEFA Europa League)	1	—		38	4
Career total			139	6	16	0	43	2	7	0	205	8

=== International ===
As of match played 15 November 2026

Appearances and goals by national team and year
National team	Year	Apps	Goals
Croatia	2021	3	0
Croatia	2022	5	0
Croatia	2023	8	0
Croatia	2024	4	0
Croatia	2025	7	0
Croatia	2026	13	0
Total		40	0

== Honours ==
Bayern Munich II

- 3. Liga: 2019–20

Bayern Munich

- Bundesliga: 2020–21, 2021–22, 2022–23, 2024–25, 2025–26
- DFB-Pokal: 2025–26
- DFL/Franz Beckenbauer Supercup: 2021, 2022, 2025, 2026

Bayer Leverkusen

- Bundesliga: 2023–24
- DFB-Pokal: 2023–24
- UEFA Europa League runner-up: 2023–24

Croatia

- FIFA World Cup third place: 2022
- UEFA Nations League runner-up: 2022–23
