= Dragutin Tadijanović =

Croatian poet

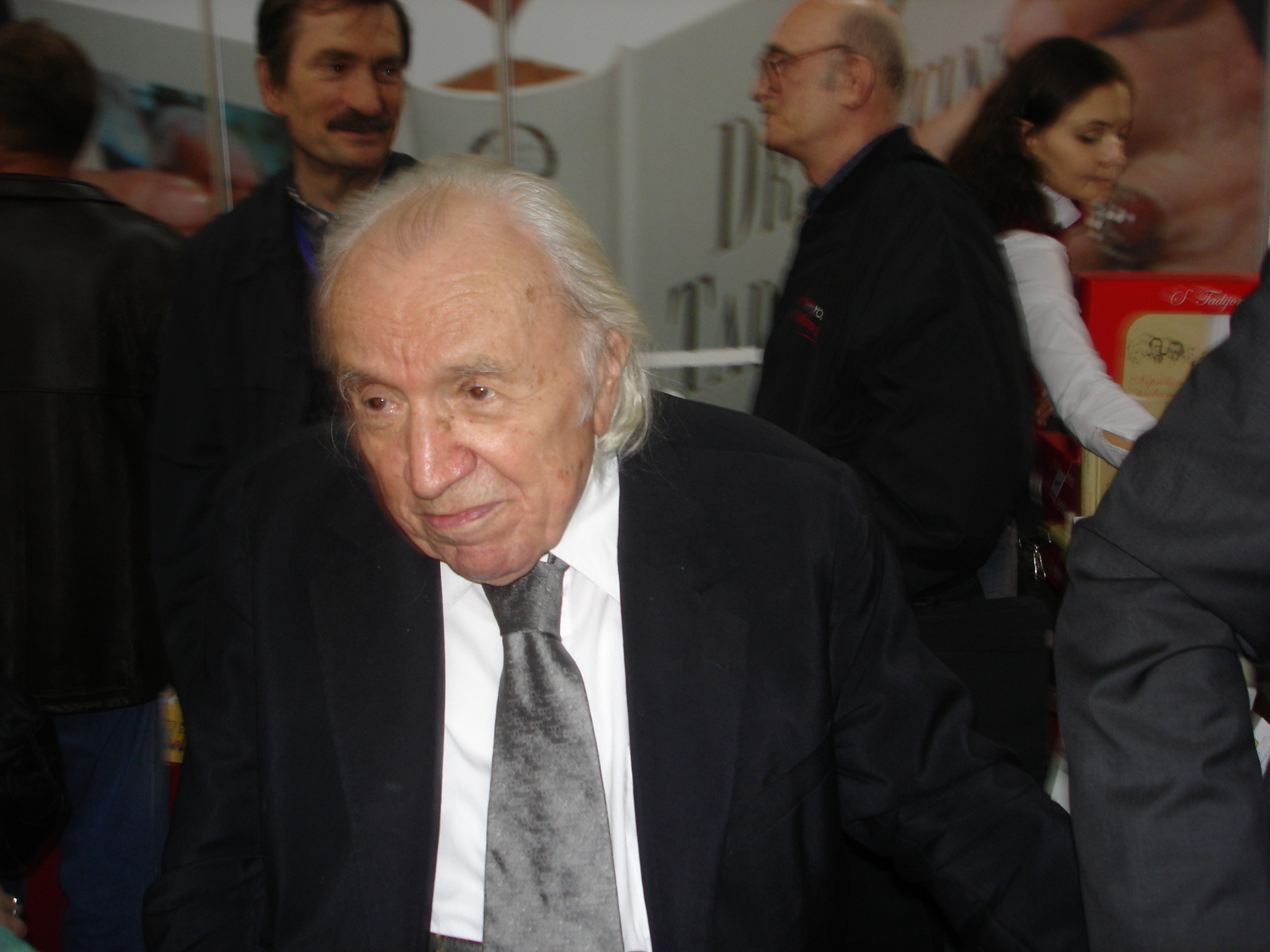
- Dragutin Tadijanović (in 2005, at the time of his 100th birthday)
- Born: 4 November 1905; Rastušje, Croatia-Slavonia, Austria-Hungary
- Died: 27 June 2007 (aged 101); Zagreb, Croatia
- Occupation: poet

Dragutin Tadijanović (4 November 1905 – 27 June 2007) was a Croatian poet, and in his native Croatia he is referred to as a "Bard."

Tadijanović was born in the village of Rastušje close to Slavonski Brod in the region of Slavonia. He published his first poem in 1922. He graduated in literature and philosophy at the University of Zagreb in 1937.

He worked as the lector of the official paper Narodne novine (1935–1940), taught at the Academy of Arts in Zagreb (1939–1945). Later he worked at the publishing houses "Zora" and "Hrvatski pjesnici", and Matica hrvatska.

He joined the Yugoslav Academy of Sciences and Arts's Literary Institute, where he became the director in 1953 and served until his retirement in 1973. He was the president of the Society of Croatian Writers in 1964–1965, and he also became an academician of the academy.

Tadijanović holds distinction as one of the most popular and most influential Croatian poets of 20th century. His poem Balada o zaklanim ovcama ("Ballad of Slaughtered Sheep"), written in the 1930s, is one of the most powerful works of Croatian literature. His works were translated into over 20 languages, and he published over 500 poems in some twenty collections.

He was crowned by an olive wreath and so became poeta oliveatus at Croatia rediviva poetry manifestation in Selca on the island of Brač in 2001. His verses are carved at the marble plaque on the Wall of poetry.

Before he died at the age of 101, he was among the longest-living writers in Croatian history with generations having to study his poems in school. His last couple of birthdays were marked with reports on national TV, awards and other special events and his commemoration ceremony was held at the Old City Hall on uphill Zagreb attended by the Mayor of Zagreb and other political and cultural officials. His funeral was performed by auxiliary bishop of Zagreb Vlado Košić.

An award has been named after him and granted since 2008 by the Croatian Academy of Sciences and Arts (HAZU) for the life achievement in poetry.
