= Banovci =

Banovci may refer to several places:

- Banovci, Vukovar-Syrmia County, a village in Croatia
- Banovci, Brod-Posavina County, a village in Croatia
- Banovci, Slovenia, a village in Slovenia
- Stari Banovci, a village in Serbia, part of Stara Pazova municipality
- Novi Banovci, a neighbourhood of Stara Pazova, Serbia
- Vinkovački Banovci, a village in Croatia
