= Živike =

- Village
- Location within Croatia
- Coordinates: 45°09′00″N 17°40′30″E
- Country: Croatia
- County: Brod-Posavina

Area
  - Total: 9.3 km^{2} (3.6 sq mi)

Population (2021)
  - Total: 189
  - Density: 20/km^{2} (53/sq mi)
- Time zone: UTC+1 (CET)
  - Summer (DST): UTC+2 (CEST)
- Postal code: 35250 Oriovac

Živike is a village in municipality of Oriovac in the central part of Brod-Posavina County.
