= Bečic =

- Village
- Location within Croatia
- Coordinates: 45°11′31″N 17°42′25″E
- Country: Croatia
- County: Brod-Posavina

Area
  - Total: 2.6 km^{2} (1.0 sq mi)

Population (2021)
  - Total: 95
  - Density: 37/km^{2} (95/sq mi)
- Time zone: UTC+1 (CET)
  - Summer (DST): UTC+2 (CEST)
- Postal code: 35250 Oriovac

Bečic is a village in the municipality of Oriovac in the central part of Brod-Posavina County, Croatia.
