= Stari Slatinik =

- Village
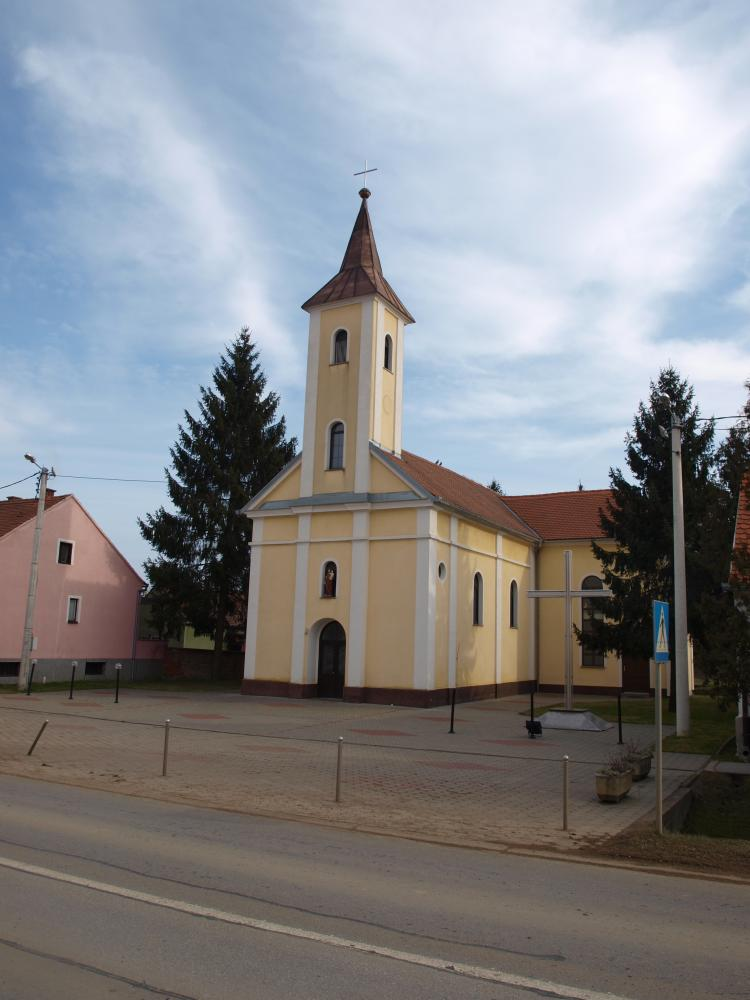
- Stari Slatinik, Roman Catholic church

- Location within Croatia
- Coordinates: 45°10′N 17°50′E
- Country: Croatia
- County: Brod-Posavina
- Municipality: Brodski Stupnik

Area
  - Total: 23.0 km^{2} (8.9 sq mi)

Population (2021)
  - Total: 959
  - Density: 41.7/km^{2} (108/sq mi)
- Time zone: UTC+1 (CET)
  - Summer (DST): UTC+2 (CEST)
- Postal code: 35253 Brodski Stupnik
- Area code: 035

Stari Slatinik is a village in the municipality of Brodski Stupnik in central Brod-Posavina County, Croatia.
