= Pričac =

- Village
- Location within Croatia
- Coordinates: 45°08′17″N 17°40′34″E
- Country: Croatia
- County: Brod-Posavina

Area
  - Total: 5.4 km^{2} (2.1 sq mi)

Population (2021)
  - Total: 90
  - Density: 17/km^{2} (43/sq mi)
- Time zone: UTC+1 (CET)
  - Summer (DST): UTC+2 (CEST)
- Postal code: 35257 Lužani

Pričac is a village in municipality of Oriovac in the central part of Brod-Posavina County.
