= Krajačići =

- Village
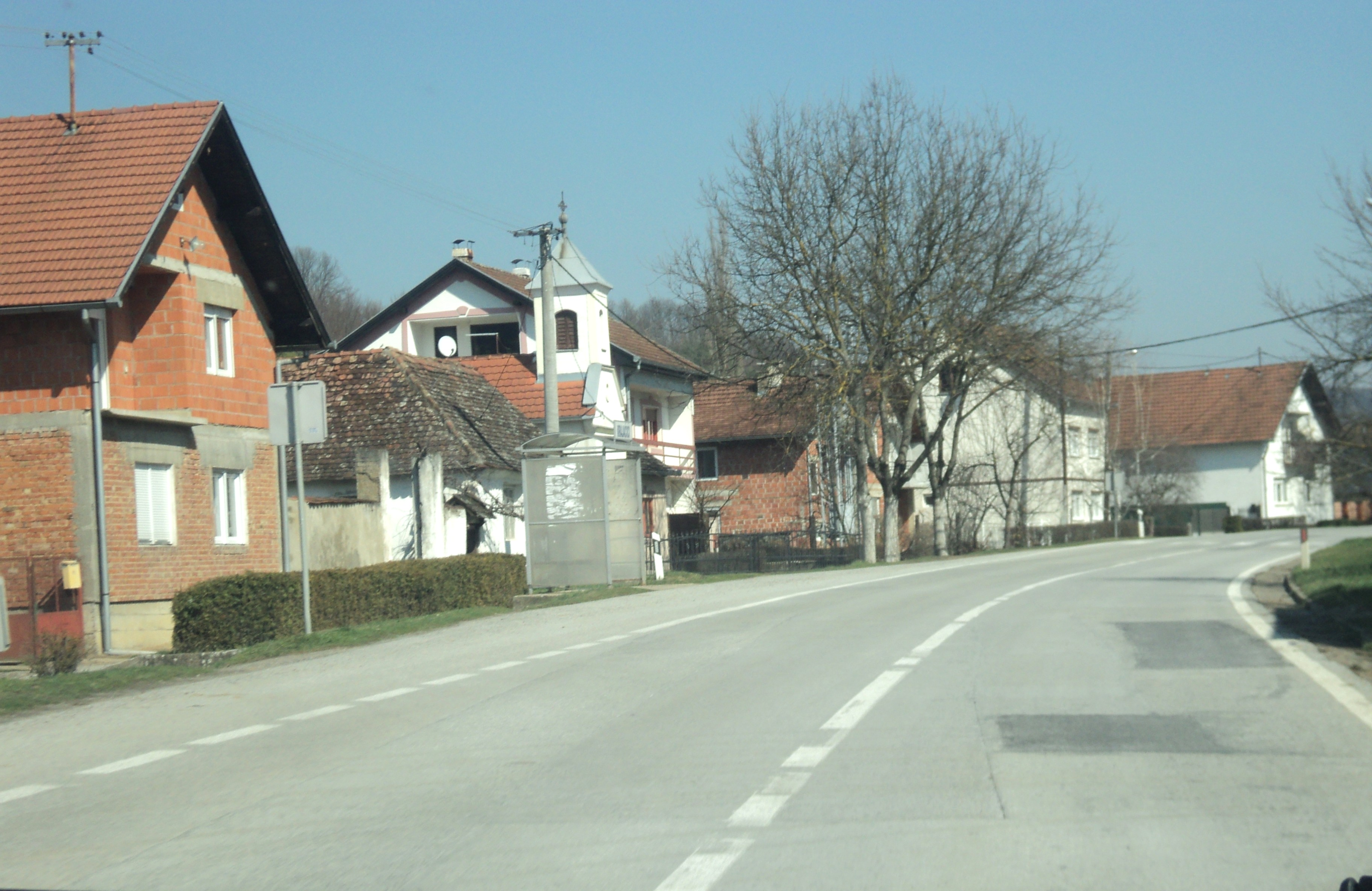

- Location within Croatia
- Coordinates: 45°12′22″N 17°50′42″E
- Country: Croatia
- County: Brod-Posavina
- Municipality: Brodski Stupnik

Area
  - Total: 9.2 km^{2} (3.6 sq mi)

Population (2021)
  - Total: 82
  - Density: 8.9/km^{2} (23/sq mi)
- Time zone: UTC+1 (CET)
  - Summer (DST): UTC+2 (CEST)
- Postal code: 35253 Brodski Stupnik
- Area code: 035

Krajačići is a village in municipality of Brodski Stupnik in the central part of Brod-Posavina County.
