= Radovanje =

Radovanje may refer to:

- Radovanje, Serbia, a village near Velika Plana, Serbia
- Radovanje, Croatia, a village near Oriovac, Croatia
