= Ciglenik =

Ciglenik may refer to:

- Ciglenik, Požega-Slavonia County, a village near Kutjevo, Croatia
- Ciglenik, Brod-Posavina County, a village near Oriovac, Croatia
