= Lovčić =

- Village
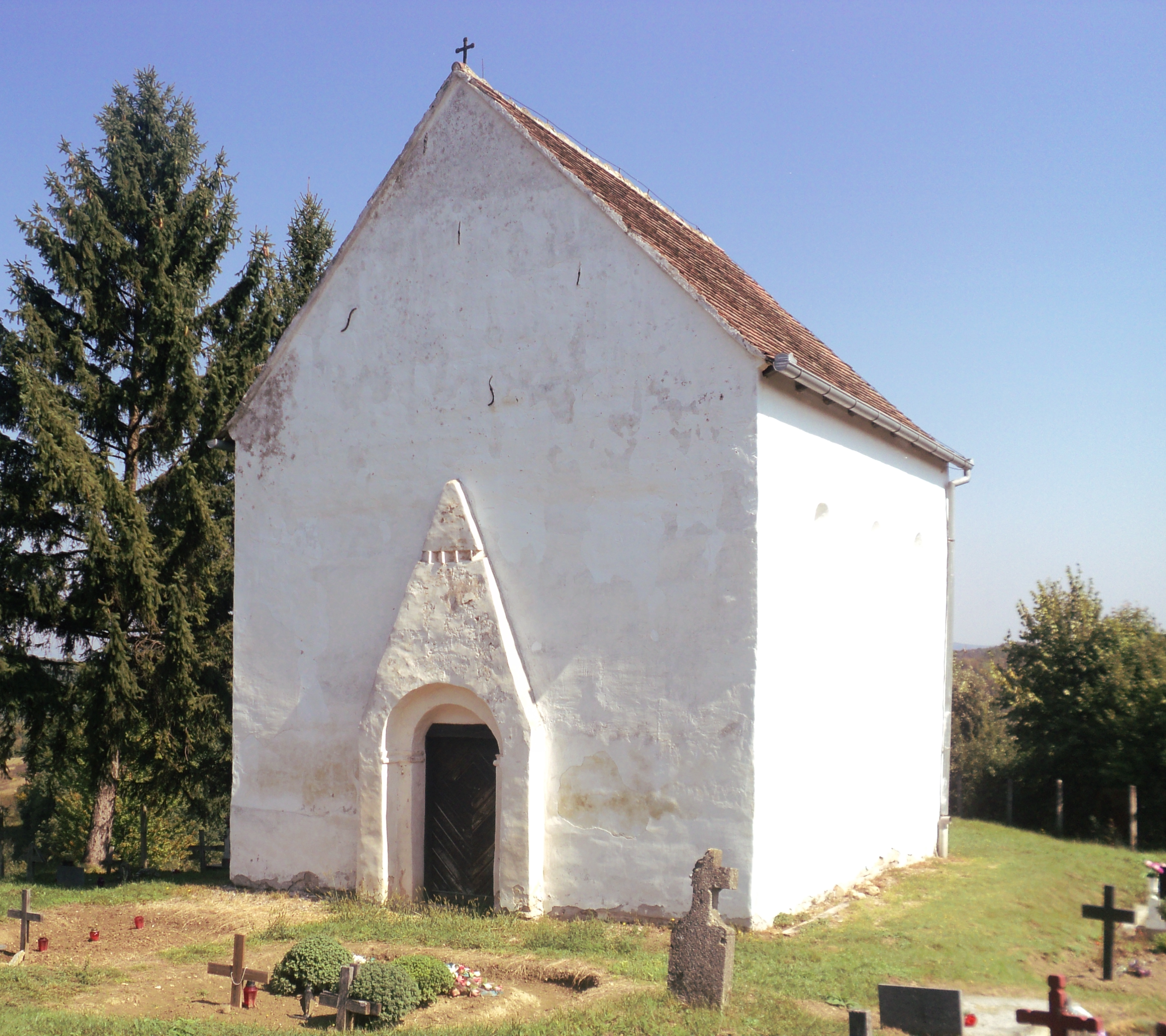
- Church of St. Martin in Lovčić from the 13th century

- Location within Croatia
- Coordinates: 45°12′N 17°48′E
- Country: Croatia
- County: Brod-Posavina
- Municipality: Brodski Stupnik

Area
  - Total: 8.2 km^{2} (3.2 sq mi)

Population (2021)
  - Total: 31
  - Density: 3.8/km^{2} (9.8/sq mi)
- Time zone: UTC+1 (CET)
  - Summer (DST): UTC+2 (CEST)
- Postal code: 35253 Brodski Stupnik
- Area code: 035

Lovčić is a village in municipality of Brodski Stupnik in the central part of Brod-Posavina County.

== Demographics ==
Historical populations of Lovčić 1857.-2011.
v

population	260	257	270	316	312	342	307	332	318	320	310	241	180	118	126	63
	1857	1869	1880	1890	1900	1910	1921	1931	1948	1953	1961	1971	1981	1991	2001	2011

Sources: Croatian Bureau of Statistics publications
