= Kujnik =

Kujnik may refer to:

- Kujnik, Brod-Posavina County
- Kujnik, Požega-Slavonia County
