= Slavonski Kobaš =

- Village
- Location within Croatia
- Coordinates: 45°06′22″N 17°44′46″E
- Country: Croatia
- County: Brod-Posavina

Area
  - Total: 32.3 km^{2} (12.5 sq mi)

Population (2021)
  - Total: 1,034
  - Density: 32.0/km^{2} (82.9/sq mi)
- Time zone: UTC+1 (CET)
  - Summer (DST): UTC+2 (CEST)
- Postal code: 35250 Oriovac

Slavonski Kobaš is a village in municipality of Oriovac in the central part of Brod-Posavina County.

== History ==
Upon the conclusion of the Treaty of Passarowitz in 1718, Kobaš was to be transferred to the Habsburg monarchy.

== Bibliography ==
- Roksandić, Drago (2007-10-01). "Posavska krajina/granica od 1718. do 1739. godine". Ekonomska i ekohistorija: časopis za gospodarsku povijest i povijest okoliša (in Serbo-Croatian) (3): 62–82. eISSN 1849-0190.
- Pelidija, Enes (1989). Bosanski ejalet od Karlovačkog do Požarevačkog mira 1699 - 1718 (in Serbo-Croatian). Sarajevo. pp. 237–259.
