= Jaruge =

Coordinates: 45°07′N 18°25′E

- Village
- Interactive map of Jaruge
- Country: Croatia
- County: Brod-Posavina County
- Municipality: Sikirevci

Area
  - Total: 6.5 km^{2} (2.5 sq mi)

Population (2021)
  - Total: 538
  - Density: 83/km^{2} (210/sq mi)
- Time zone: UTC+1 (CET)
  - Summer (DST): UTC+2 (CEST)

Jaruge is a village in Croatia. The population is 738.
