= Bebrina =

- Village
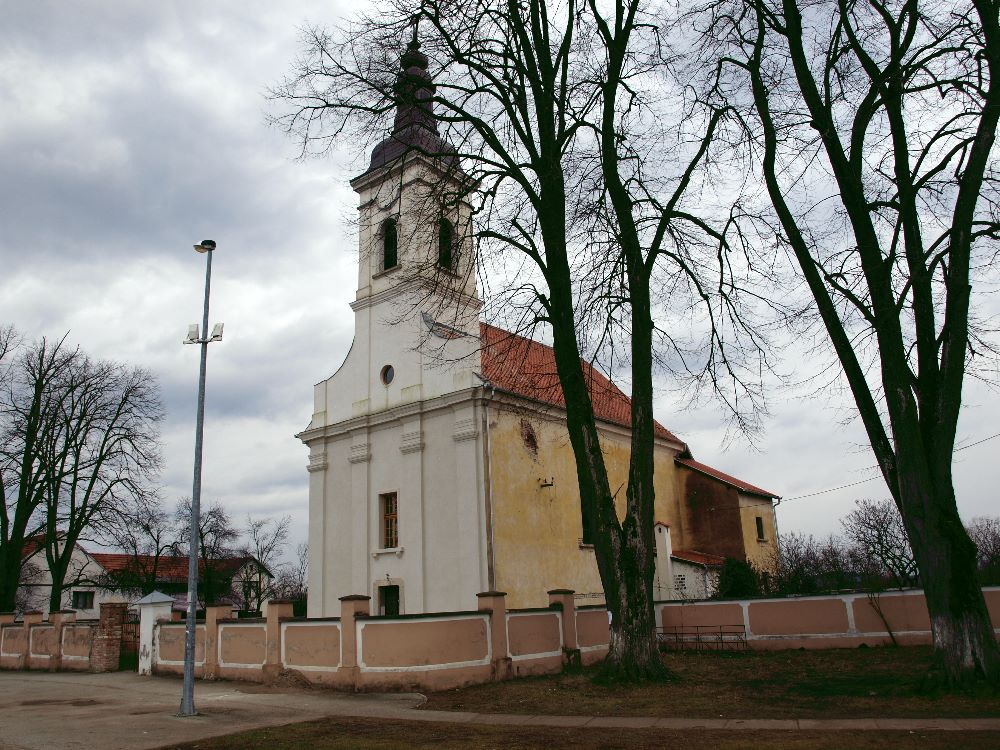
- Bebrina, Roman Catholic church
- Interactive map of Bebrina
- Location within Croatia
- Coordinates: 45°6′N 17°50′E
- Country: Croatia
- County: Brod-Posavina County

Government
  - Mayor: Ivan Brzić (HDZ)

Area
  - Village: 101.2 km^{2} (39.1 sq mi)
  - Urban: 14.0 km^{2} (5.4 sq mi)

Population (2021)
  - Village: 2,817
  - Density: 27.84/km^{2} (72.09/sq mi)
  - Urban: 372
  - Urban density: 26.6/km^{2} (68.8/sq mi)
- Postal code: 35000 Slavonski Brod
- Area code: +385 (0)35
- Website: bebrina.hr

Bebrina is a settlement and a municipality in the Brod-Posavina County, Croatia. In 2011, there were 3,252 inhabitants in the municipality, of which 95.42% were Croats and 2.55% Ukrainians.

== Demographics ==
In 2021, the municipality had 2,817 residents in the following settlements:

- Banovci, population 340
- Bebrina, population 372
- Dubočac, population 179
- Kaniža, population 704
- Stupnički Kuti, population 331
- Šumeće, population 529
- Zbjeg, population 362
Bebrina: Population trends 1857–2021
v

population	4246	4239	3662	3966	3918	4854	4573	4857	4952	4845	4532	3998	3469	3464	3541	3252	2817
	1857	1869	1880	1890	1900	1910	1921	1931	1948	1953	1961	1971	1981	1991	2001	2011	2021

Sources: Croatian Bureau of Statistics publications
