= Tomica, Croatia =

Coordinates: 45°11′39″N 18°02′34″E

Tomica
- Interactive map of Tomica

Tomica is a village near Podcrkavlje, Croatia. In the 2011 census, it had 479 inhabitants.
