= Radovanje, Croatia =

Radovanje
- Village
- Location within Croatia
- Coordinates: 45°09′32″N 17°46′35″E
- Country: Croatia
- County: Brod-Posavina

Area
  - Total: 3.7 km^{2} (1.4 sq mi)

Population (2021)
  - Total: 231
  - Density: 62/km^{2} (160/sq mi)
- Time zone: UTC+1 (CET)
  - Summer (DST): UTC+2 (CEST)
- Postal code: 35250 Oriovac

Radovanje is a village in municipality of Oriovac in the central part of Brod-Posavina County.
