= Gundinci =

- Municipality
- Interactive map of Gundinci
- Location of Gundinci in Croatia
- Coordinates: 45°10′N 18°29′E
- Country: Croatia
- County: Brod-Posavina County

Government
  - Mayor: Ilija Markotić (SDP)

Area
  - Municipality: 58.5 km^{2} (22.6 sq mi)
  - Urban: 58.5 km^{2} (22.6 sq mi)

Population (2021)
  - Municipality: 1,610
  - Density: 27.5/km^{2} (71.3/sq mi)
  - Urban: 1,610
  - Urban density: 27.5/km^{2} (71.3/sq mi)
- Postal code: 35222 Gundinci
- Website: gundinci.hr

Gundinci is a municipality and its only settlement, located within the Brod-Posavina County, Croatia. In 2001, there were 2,294 inhabitants, of which 99% declared themselves Croats.

== Demographics ==
In 2021, the municipality had 1,610 residents in the following 1 settlements:

- Gundinci, population 1610
Gundinci: Population trends 1857–2021
v

population	2163	2233	2022	2070	2100	2101	1992	2182	2318	2463	2763	2585	2251	2186	2294	2027	1610
	1857	1869	1880	1890	1900	1910	1921	1931	1948	1953	1961	1971	1981	1991	2001	2011	2021

Sources: Croatian Bureau of Statistics publications
