= Ciglenik, Brod-Posavina County =

Ciglenik
- Village
- Location within Croatia
- Coordinates: 45°10′55″N 17°42′22″E
- Country: Croatia
- County: Brod-Posavina

Area
  - Total: 4.2 km^{2} (1.6 sq mi)

Population (2021)
  - Total: 133
  - Density: 32/km^{2} (82/sq mi)
- Time zone: UTC+1 (CET)
  - Summer (DST): UTC+2 (CEST)
- Postal code: 35250 Oriovac

Ciglenik is a village in municipality of Oriovac in the central part of Brod-Posavina County.
