= Brodski Stupnik =

- Village
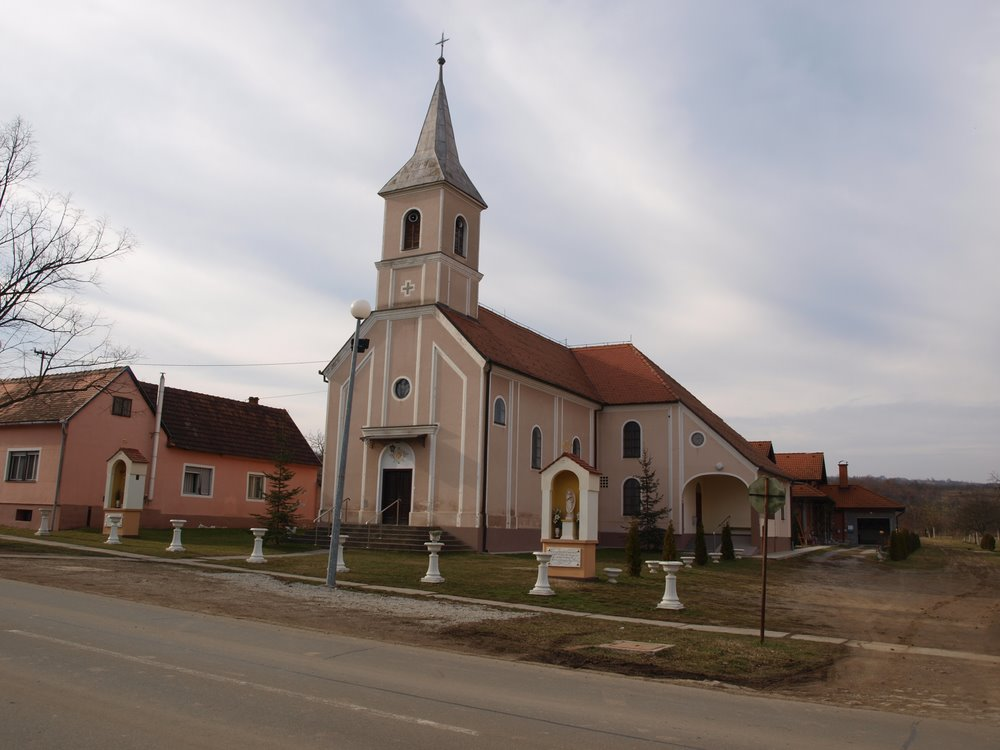
- Brodski Stupnik, Roman Catholic church
- Interactive map of Brodski Stupnik
- Location within Croatia
- Coordinates: 45°10′N 17°48′E
- Country: Croatia
- County: Brod-Posavina County

Government
  - Mayor: Goran Jelinić (Independent)

Area
  - Village: 57.9 km^{2} (22.4 sq mi)
  - Urban: 17.5 km^{2} (6.8 sq mi)

Population (2021)
  - Village: 2,357
  - Density: 40.7/km^{2} (105/sq mi)
  - Urban: 1,285
  - Urban density: 73.4/km^{2} (190/sq mi)
- Postal code: 35252 Sibinj
- Area code: 035
- Website: brodski-stupnik.hr

Brodski Stupnik is a municipality in Brod-Posavina County, Croatia. There were 3,036 inhabitants in the 2011 census, when 95% declared themselves Croats. Brodski Stupnik is a wine making region.

== Demographics ==
In 2021, the municipality had 2,357 residents in the following settlements:

- Brodski Stupnik, population 1285
- Krajačići, population 82
- Lovčić, population 31
- Stari Slatinik, population 959
Brodski Stupnik: Population trends 1857–2021
v

population	1178	1184	1195	1646	1883	2316	2532	2480	2621	2757	3029	3096	3136	3267	3526	3036	2357
	1857	1869	1880	1890	1900	1910	1921	1931	1948	1953	1961	1971	1981	1991	2001	2011	2021

Sources: Croatian Bureau of Statistics publications
