= Klakar =

Croatian municipality

- Interactive map of Klakar
- Location within Croatia
- Coordinates: 45°06′N 18°08′E
- Country: Croatia
- County: Brod-Posavina County

Government
  - Mayor: Tomislav Pendic (HDZ)

Area
  - Total: 53.5 km^{2} (20.7 sq mi)

Population (2021)
  - Total: 2,020
  - Density: 37.8/km^{2} (97.8/sq mi)
- Time zone: UTC+1 (CET)
  - Summer (DST): UTC+2 (CEST)
- Website: opcinaklakar.hr

Klakar is a village and a municipality in Brod-Posavina County, Croatia. In 2001, there were 2,417 inhabitants, of which 99% declared themselves Croats.

== Demographics ==
In 2021, the municipality had 2,020 residents in the following settlements:

- Donja Bebrina, population 378
- Gornja Bebrina, population 393
- Klakar, population 243
- Ruščica, population 1,006
Klakar: Population trends 1857–2021
v

population	2339	2283	2121	2225	2304	2384	2168	2189	2226	2294	2334	2274	2250	2294	2417	2319	2020
	1857	1869	1880	1890	1900	1910	1921	1931	1948	1953	1961	1971	1981	1991	2001	2011	2021

Sources: Croatian Bureau of Statistics publications

== Weather ==
In Klakar, the summers are warm, the winters are very cold, and it is partly cloudy year-round. Over the course of the year, the temperature typically varies from 26°F to 83°F and is rarely below 14°F or above 93°F.
