= Banovci, Brod-Posavina County =

Banovci
- village
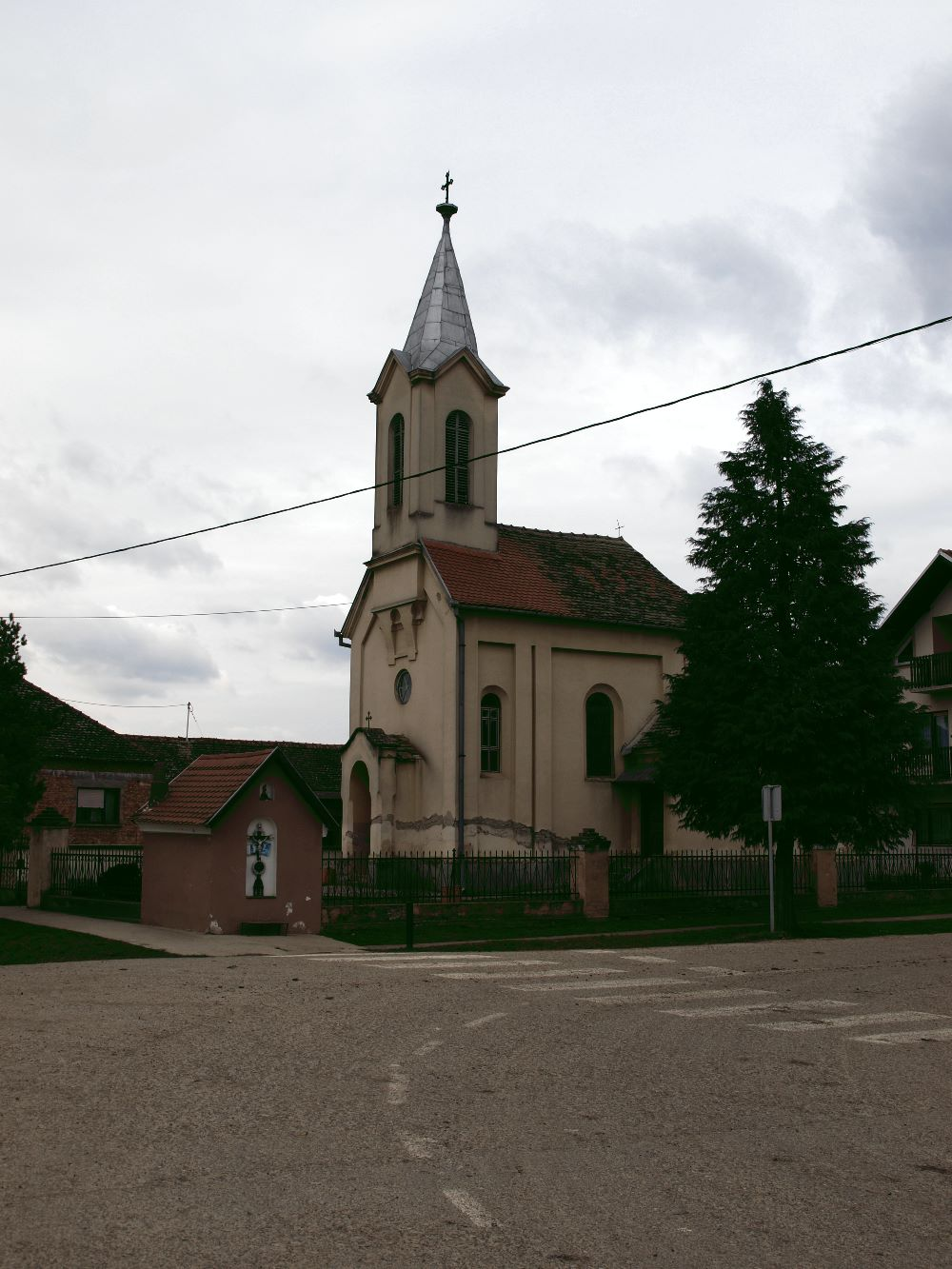

- Location within Croatia
- Coordinates: 45°04′N 17°49′E
- Country: Croatia
- County: Brod-Posavina

Area
  - Total: 9.7 km^{2} (3.7 sq mi)

Population (2021)
  - Total: 340
  - Density: 35/km^{2} (91/sq mi)
- Time zone: UTC+1 (CET)
  - Summer (DST): UTC+2 (CEST)
- Postal code: 35254 Bebrina
- Area code: 035

Banovci is a village in the municipality of Bebrina in the central part of Brod-Posavina county. From the 2011 census the village had a population of 400 inhabitants in which over 90% declare themselves Croats, other residents are Ukrainians and others.

== Geography ==
It is located 20 km southwest of Slavonski Brod, 3 km north of Bosnia.

== Gallery ==
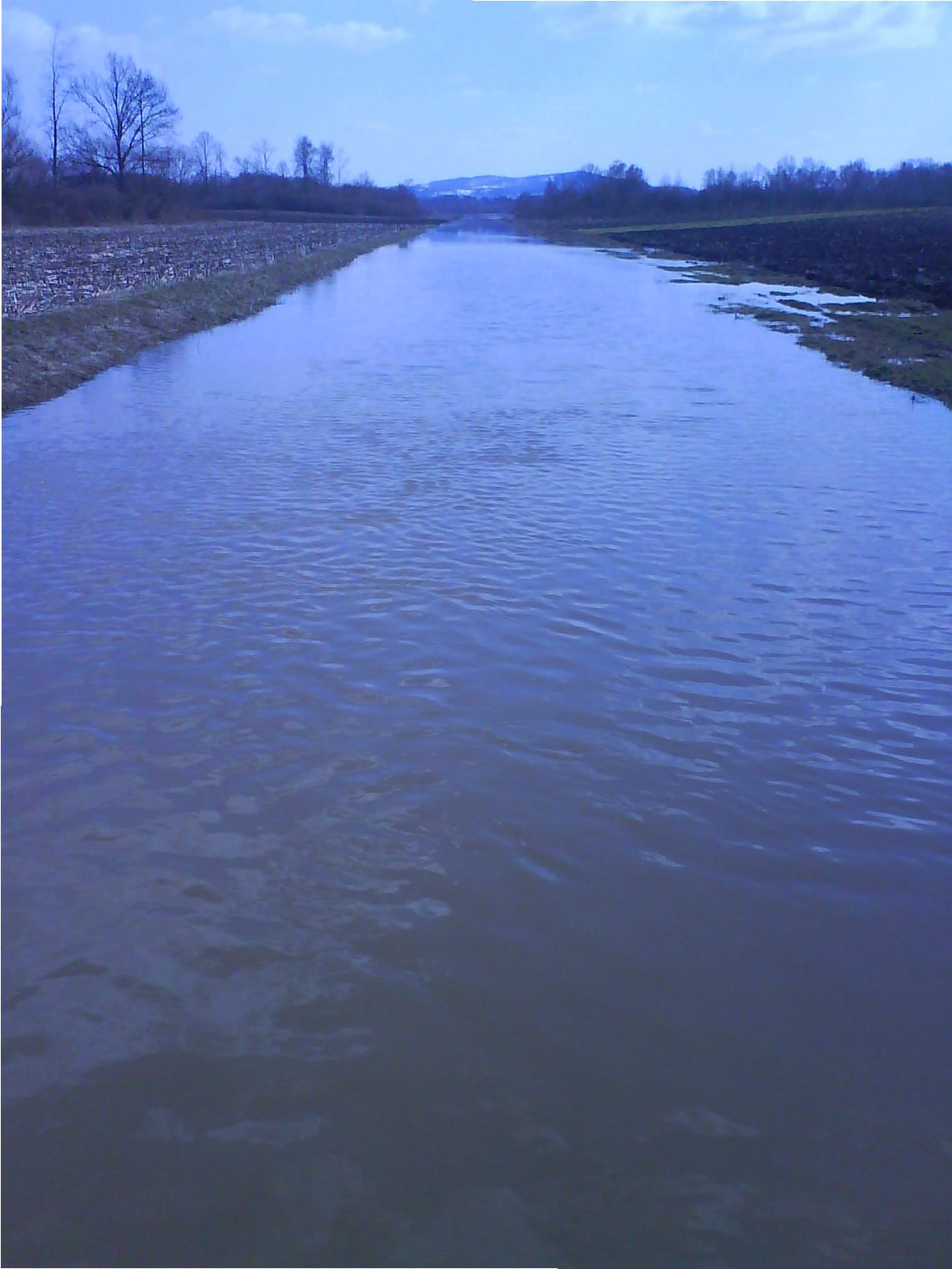
Veliki kanal which runs south of the village

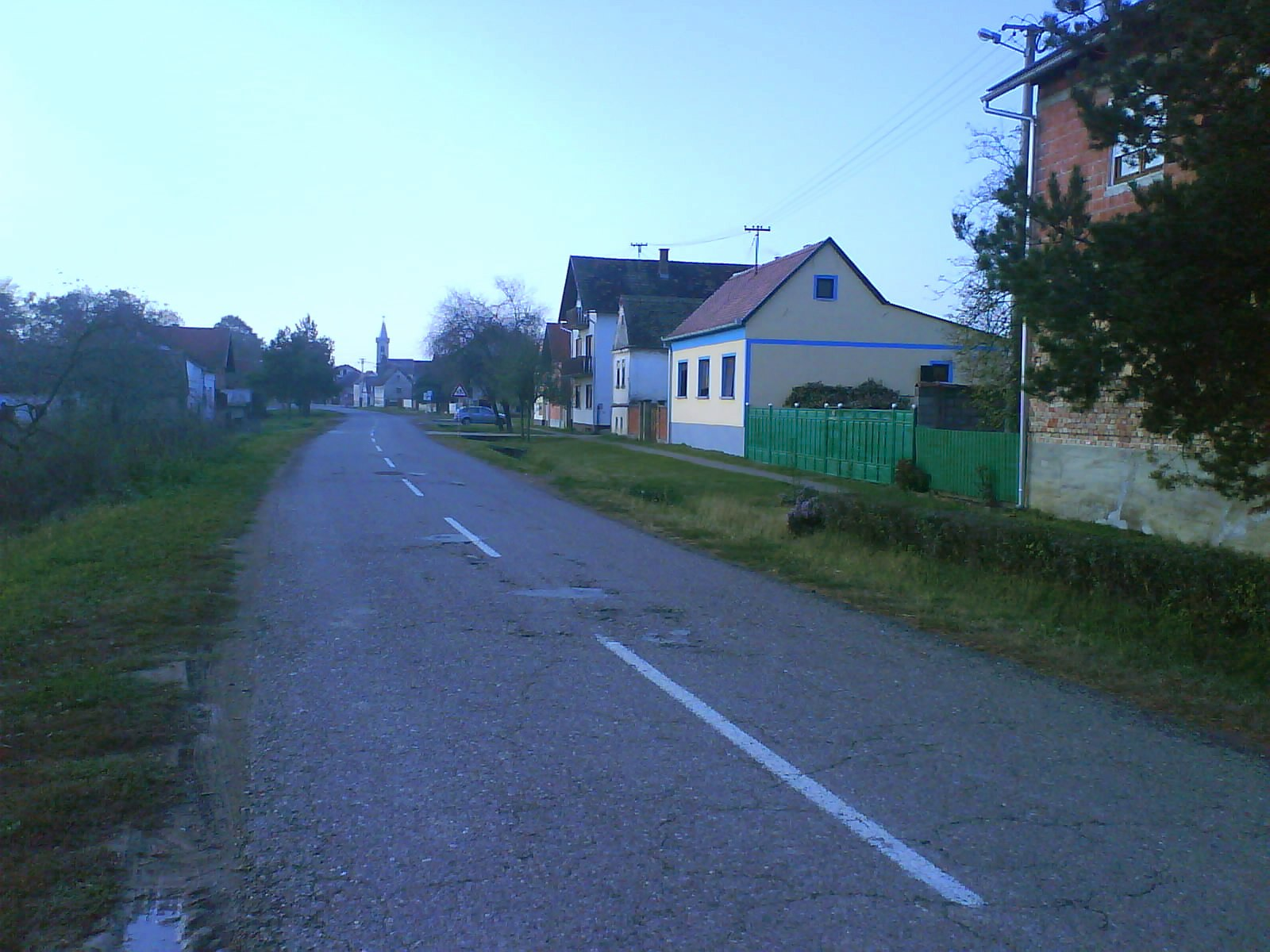
Banovci in autumn

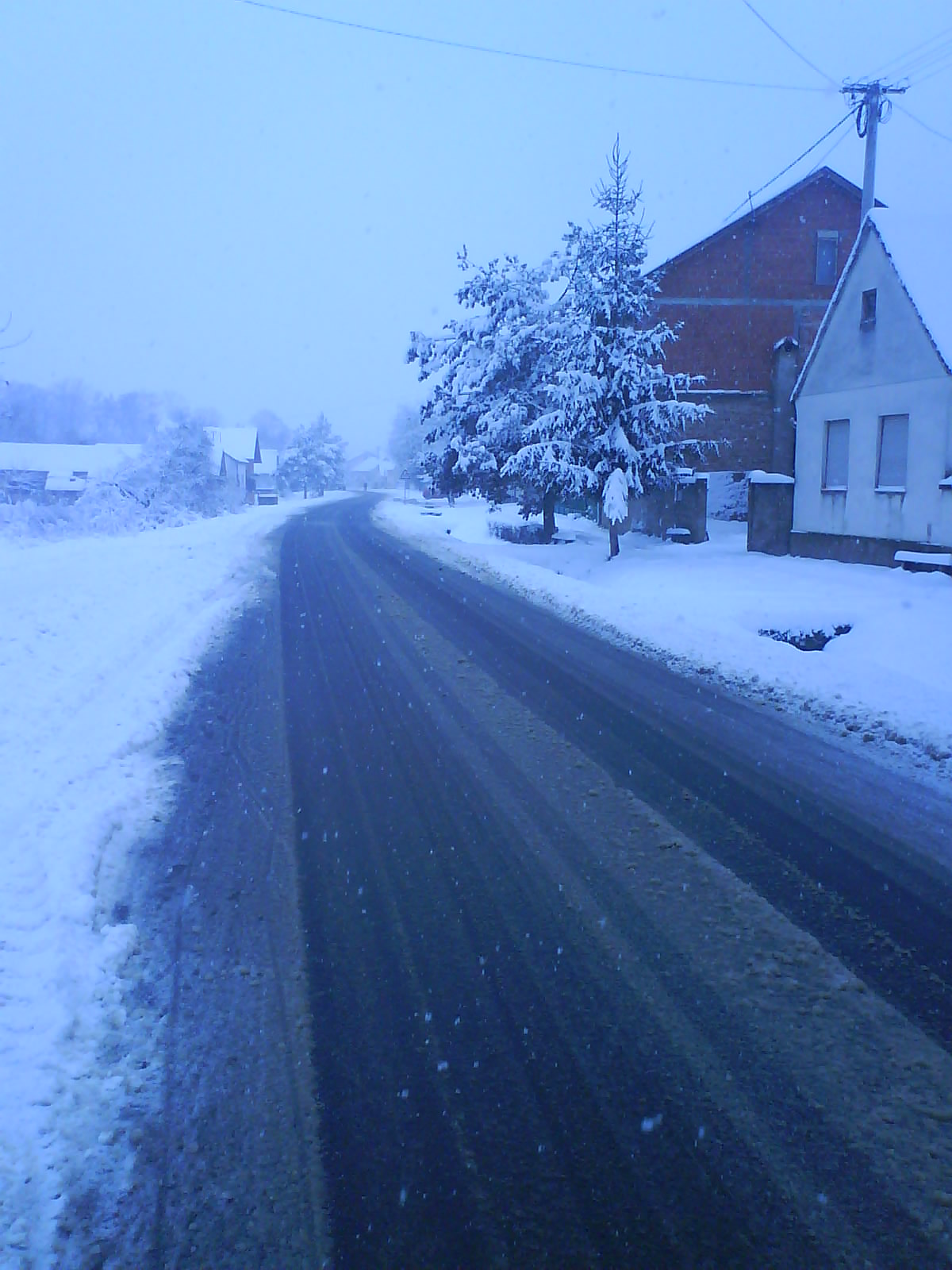
Winter in Banovci

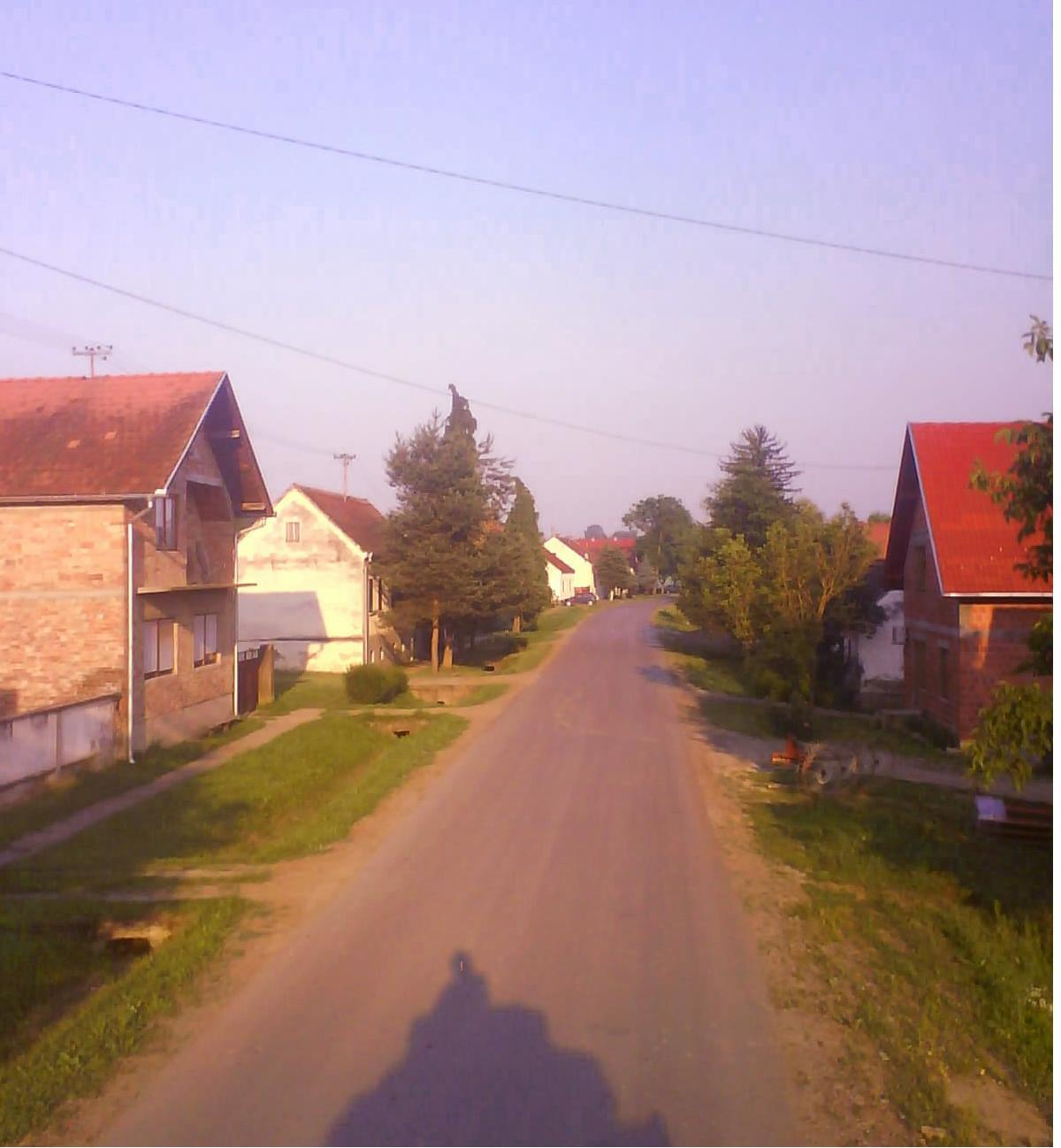

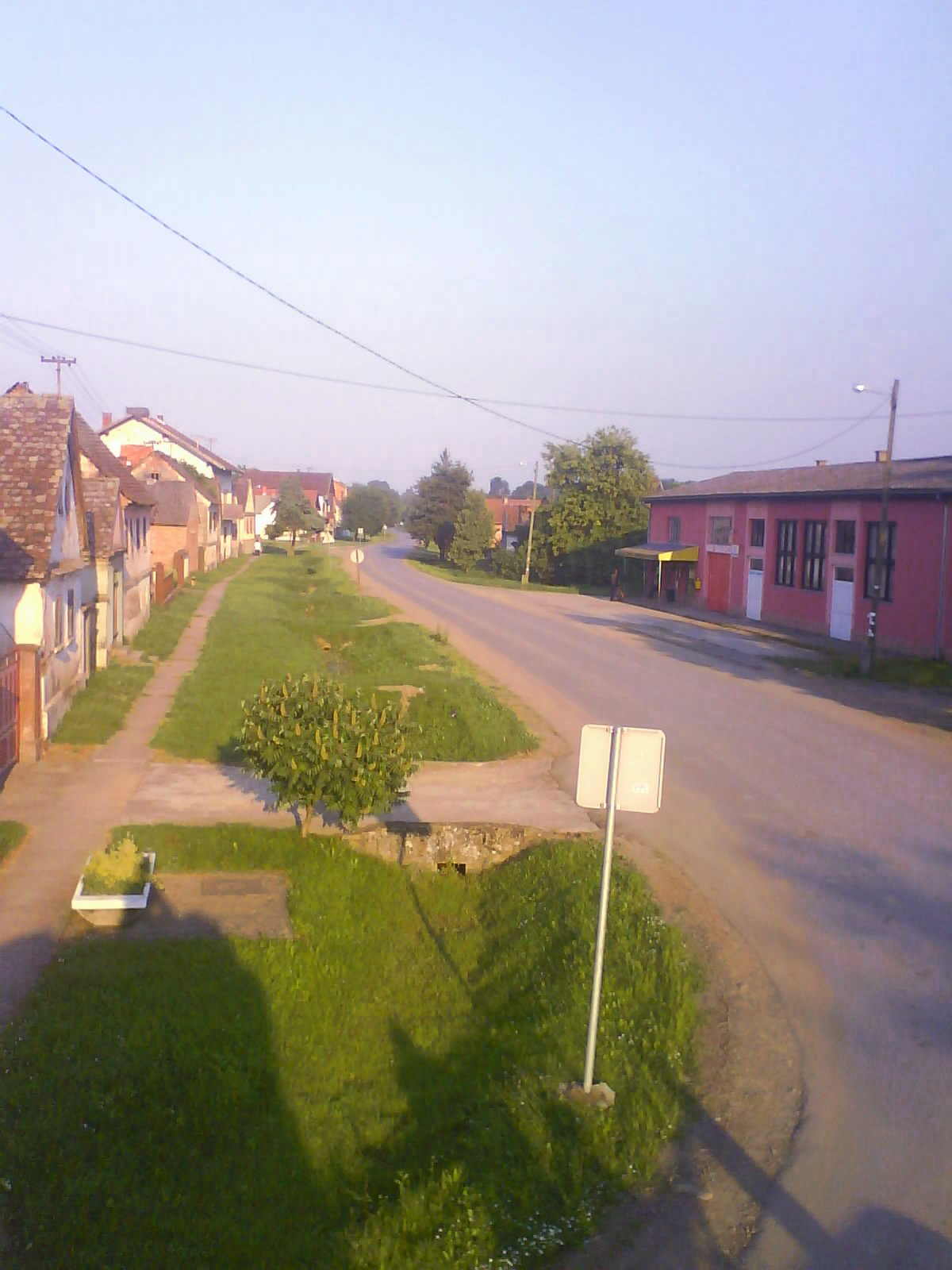
Centre of the village
