= Sikirevci =

Croatian village and municipality

- Interactive map of Sikirevci
- Location within Croatia
- Coordinates: 45°07′N 18°28′E
- Country: Croatia
- County: Brod-Posavina County

Government
  - Mayor: Josip Nikolic (NL)

Area
  - Total: 29.7 km^{2} (11.5 sq mi)

Population (2021)
  - Total: 2,028
  - Density: 68.3/km^{2} (177/sq mi)
- Time zone: UTC+1 (CET)
  - Summer (DST): UTC+2 (CEST)
- Postal code: 35224 Sikirevci
- Website: opcina-sikirevci.hr

Sikirevci is a village and municipality in Brod-Posavina County, Croatia. The municipality consists of two settlements: Sikirevci and Jaruge.

== History ==
The name Sikrevci was first mentioned in 1540 as a river crossing ferry across the Sava river. The second mention of the name is also from the time of Ottoman rule in 1579 when it mentions the village of Sikirevci consisting of 31 houses with their respective properties. After the liberation from the Turks the village was re-established as a military (Grenzer) village. From the mid-18th century the village witnessed advanced urbanization and it became the seat of the 5th company (captaincy) of the Brod regiment. During the 'Canonical Visitation' in 1748, it was established that the village had 41 houses with 298 grown-ups and 100 children. Most of the population were soldiers (Grenzers) and/or common villagers.

From the census in 1698, the native families of the village were: Jarić, Rakitić, Nikolić, Galović, Živić, Lučić, Marković, Benaković, Dimšić, and Dorić. From 1725, additional families settled in the village: Bašlinović, Radovanović, Šarčević, Zečević, Bilokapić, Čivić, and Tursun.

The first mention of the Catholic parish of Sikirevci was mentioned in 1670, when Bishop Matej Belinić performed the Confirmation in the same parish. After the liberation from the Ottoman Empire the parish was added to the Velika Kopanica parish. The first brick-constructed church was built in 1776. Before that there was only a small chapel with a bell tower. The parish of Sikirevci was re-established again in 1789, and today's church was built in 1848.

The municipality of Sikirevci was first established as an administrative office in 1873, after abolishment and de-militarization of the Military Frontier. After the Croatian War of Independence the municipality was re-established by its extraction from the municipality of Slavonski Šamac.

== Population ==
In 2021, the municipality had 2,028 residents in the following settlements:

- Jaruge, population 538
- Sikirevci, population 1,490
Sikirevci: Population trends 1857–2021
v

population	2002	2037	1820	1832	1886	1805	1629	1736	1983	2187	2415	2719	2672	2755	2707	2476	2028
	1857	1869	1880	1890	1900	1910	1921	1931	1948	1953	1961	1971	1981	1991	2001	2011	2021

Sources: Croatian Bureau of Statistics publications

=== Ethnic composition ===
- Croats 2,688
- Serbs 7
- Rusyns 1
- others and unknown 11
