= List of prefects of Brod-Posavina County =

This is a list of prefects of Brod-Posavina County.

== Prefects of Brod-Posavina County (1993–present) ==
Croatian Democratic Union (HDZ)
Croatian Peasant Party (HSS)

No.	Portrait	Name (Born–Died)	Term of Office		Party
1		Jozo Meter (1952–)	4 May 1993	30 April 1995	HDZ
2		Antun Pitlović (1954–2001)	4 May 1995	5 June 1997	HDZ
3		Mirko Tomac (1954–)	5 June 1997	2001	HDZ
4		Mato Dorić (1946–)	2001	14 June 2005	HSS
5		Šimo Đurđević (1957–)	14 June 2005	28 January 2008	HDZ
6		Danijel Marušić (1972–)	28 January 2008	Incumbent	HDZ

== See also ==
- Brod-Posavina County
