= Malino, Russia =

Malino (Russian: Малино) is the name of several inhabited localities in Russia.

Urban localities

- Malino, Moscow Oblast, a work settlement in Stupinsky District of Moscow Oblast

Rural localities

- Malino, Ryazan Oblast, a village in Fedotyevsky Rural Okrug of Spassky District of Ryazan Oblast
- Malino, Tver Oblast, a village in Kesovogorsky District of Tver Oblast
- Malino, Ferapontovsky Selsoviet, Kirillovsky District, Vologda Oblast, a village in Ferapontovsky Selsoviet of Kirillovsky District of Vologda Oblast
- Malino, Sukhoverkhovsky Selsoviet, Kirillovsky District, Vologda Oblast, a village in Sukhoverkhovsky Selsoviet of Kirillovsky District of Vologda Oblast
- Malino, Yaroslavl Oblast, a village in Krutovsky Rural Okrug of Pervomaysky District of Yaroslavl Oblast
