= Oriovac =

- Municipality
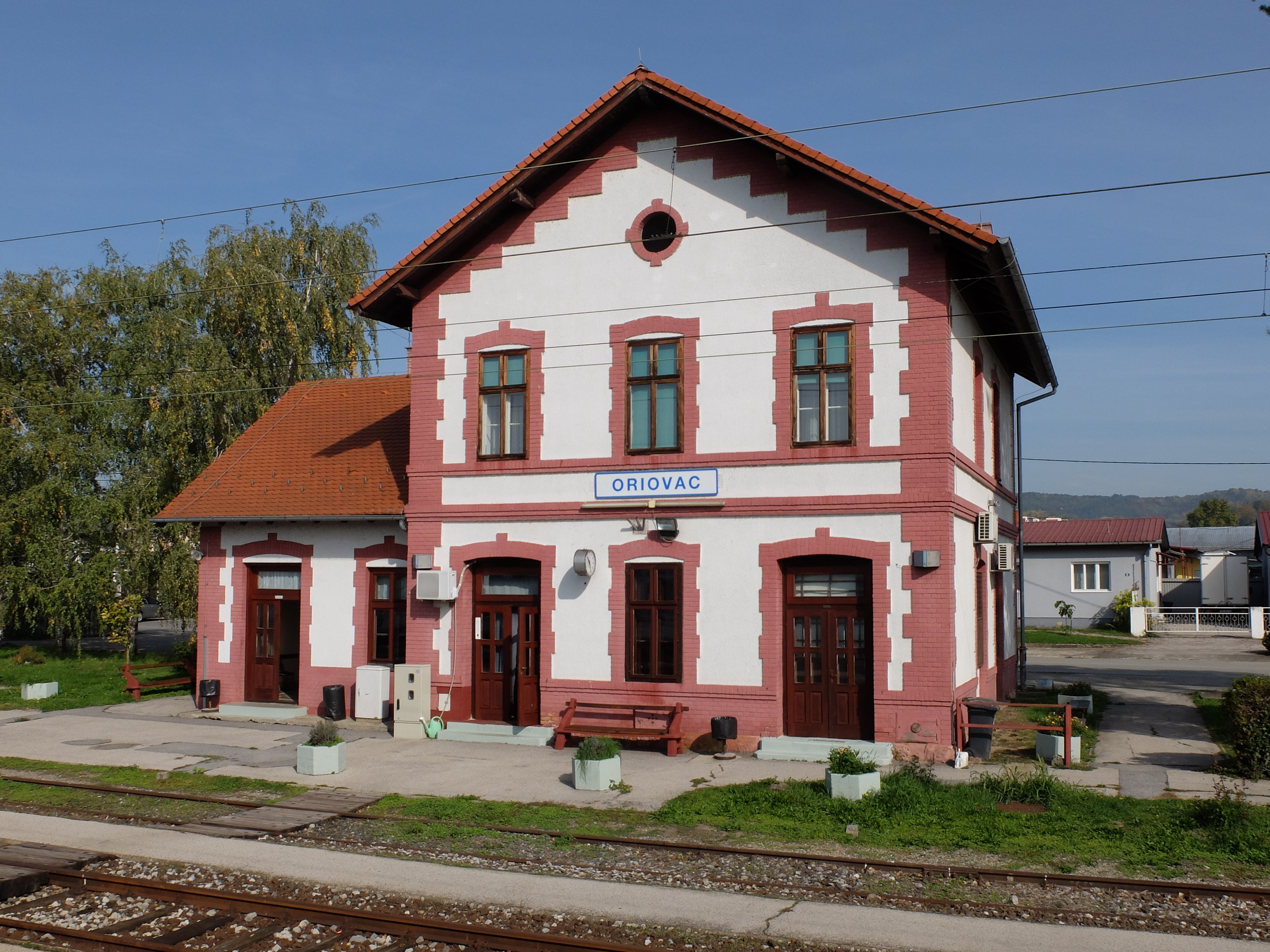
- Oriovac railway station
- Interactive map of Oriovac
- Location of Oriovac in Croatia
- Coordinates: 45°9′58″N 17°45′36″E
- Country: Croatia
- County: Brod-Posavina County

Government
  - Mayor: Antun Pavetić (HSS)

Area
  - Municipality: 93.3 km^{2} (36.0 sq mi)
  - Urban: 19.3 km^{2} (7.5 sq mi)

Population (2021)
  - Municipality: 4,770
  - Density: 51.1/km^{2} (132/sq mi)
  - Urban: 1,490
  - Urban density: 77.2/km^{2} (200/sq mi)
- Postal code: 35250 Oriovac
- Website: oriovac.hr

Oriovac is a village and a municipality in Brod-Posavina County, Croatia. It is approximately 23km west of Slavonski Brod and near the Sava river plain. The municipality is of an area of 99 km^{2} including ten settlements of which Oriovac is the main administrative center.

== History ==
According to the town's historical chronicler Marijan Machalla, the earliest mention of the town dates back to 1220. In 1535 it was conquered by the Ottoman Empire, evidence seen to this day in a 17th century fountain. In the late 1600s it became a military frontier built by the Habsburg Monarch following the Ottoman withdrawal.

Until 1918, Oriovac (named Oriowacz before 1850) was part of the Austrian monarchy (Kingdom of Croatia-Slavonia after the compromise of 1867), in the Slavonian Military Frontier, Gradiskaner Regiment N°VIII before its dissolution in 1881.

== Demographics ==
In 2021, the municipality had 4,770 residents in the following 10 settlements:

- Bečic, population 95
- Ciglenik, population 133
- Kujnik, population 248
- Lužani, population 850
- Malino, population 410
- Oriovac, population 1490
- Pričac, population 90
- Radovanje, population 231
- Slavonski Kobaš, population 1034
- Živike, population 189
Oriovac: Population trends 1857–2021
v

population	4610	4658	4731	5505	5650	6282	6227	6902	7152	7226	7185	7058	6942	6860	6559	5824	4770
	1857	1869	1880	1890	1900	1910	1921	1931	1948	1953	1961	1971	1981	1991	2001	2011	2021

Sources: Croatian Bureau of Statistics publications

== Notable people ==
- Fran Gundrum, physician and encyclopedist

== See also ==
- Oriovac railway station
