= Podcrkavlje =

- Municipality
- Interactive map of Podcrkavlje
- Location of Podcrkavlje in Croatia
- Coordinates: 45°13′N 18°01′E
- Country: Croatia
- County: Brod-Posavina County

Government
  - Mayor: Tomislav Trtanj (HDZ)

Area
  - Municipality: 95.0 km^{2} (36.7 sq mi)
  - Urban: 4.2 km^{2} (1.6 sq mi)

Population (2021)
  - Municipality: 2,207
  - Density: 23.2/km^{2} (60.2/sq mi)
  - Urban: 375
  - Urban density: 89/km^{2} (230/sq mi)
- Postal code: 35000 Slavonski Brod
- Website: podcrkavlje.hr

Podcrkavlje is a village and a municipality in Brod-Posavina County, Croatia.

== Demographics ==
In 2021, the municipality had 2,207 residents in the following 13 settlements:

- Brodski Zdenci, population 271
- Crni Potok, population 0
- Donji Slatinik, population 140
- Dubovik, population 86
- Glogovica, population 163
- Gornji Slatinik, population 92
- Grabarje, population 251
- Kindrovo, population 73
- Matković Mala, population 15
- Oriovčić, population 99
- Podcrkavlje, population 375
- Rastušje, population 237
- Tomica, population 405
Podcrkavlje: Population trends 1857–2021
v

population	2002	2237	2162	2714	3004	3378	3232	3549	3501	3429	3348	2893	2685	2553	2683	2553	2207
	1857	1869	1880	1890	1900	1910	1921	1931	1948	1953	1961	1971	1981	1991	2001	2011	2021

Sources: Croatian Bureau of Statistics publications

In 2011, 98.8% of people were Croats.
