= Malino, Croatia =

Malino
- Village
- Location within Croatia
- Coordinates: 45°10′16″N 17°43′26″E
- Country: Croatia
- County: Brod-Posavina

Area
  - Total: 4.4 km^{2} (1.7 sq mi)

Population (2021)
  - Total: 410
  - Density: 93/km^{2} (240/sq mi)
- Time zone: UTC+1 (CET)
  - Summer (DST): UTC+2 (CEST)
- Postal code: 35250 Oriovac

Malino is a village in municipality of Oriovac in the central part of Brod-Posavina County.

== History ==
The Serbian Orthodox Church of Saints Peter and Paul was destroyed by the Ustaše regime in 1941. A smaller new church was built at the cemetery after World War II in Yugoslavia but was completely demolished during the Croatian War of Independence.
