= Brod-Posavina County =

County in eastern Croatia

Coordinates: 45°09′27″N 18°01′13″E

Brod-Posavina County Brodsko-posavska županija (Croatian)
- County
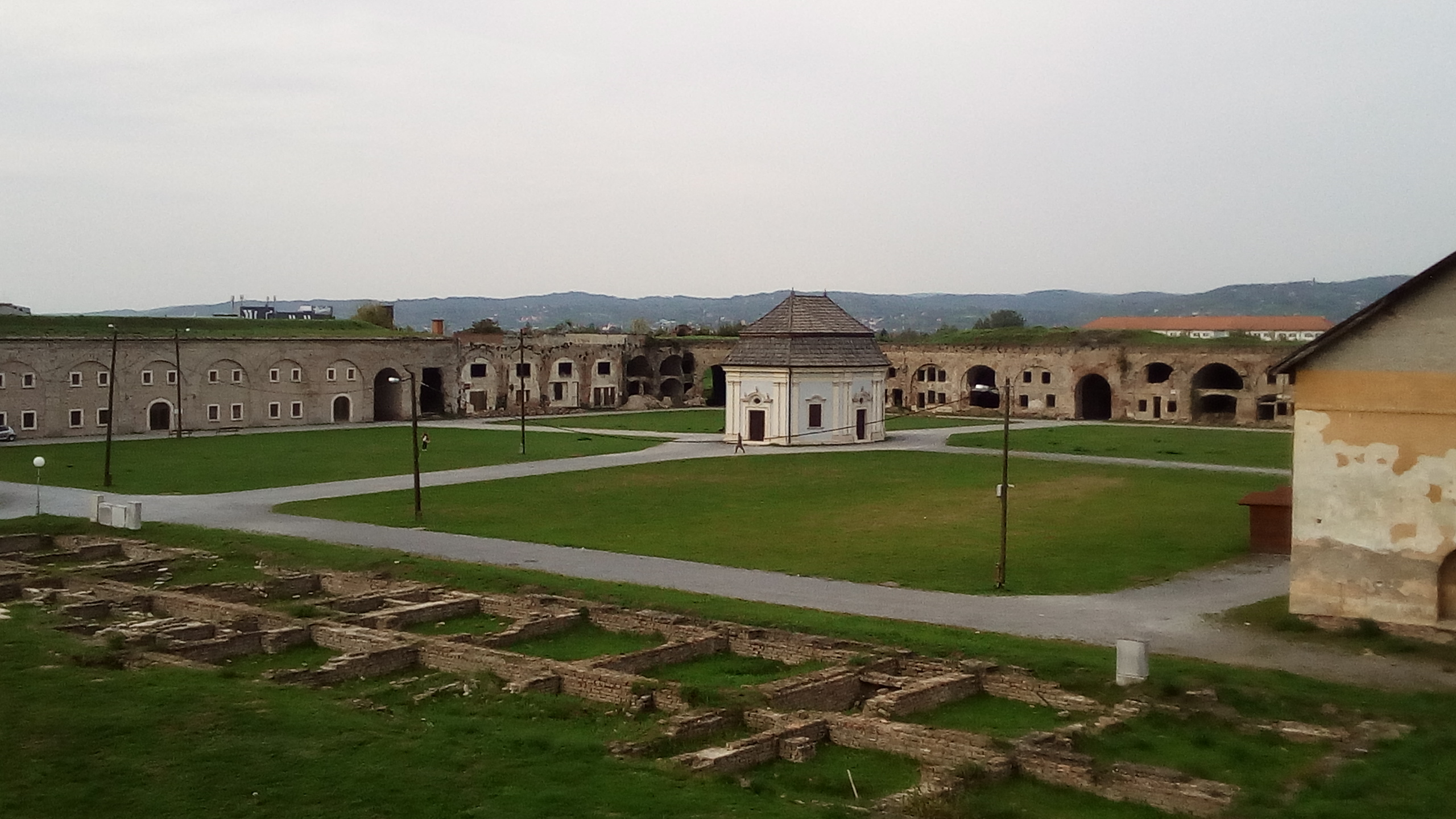
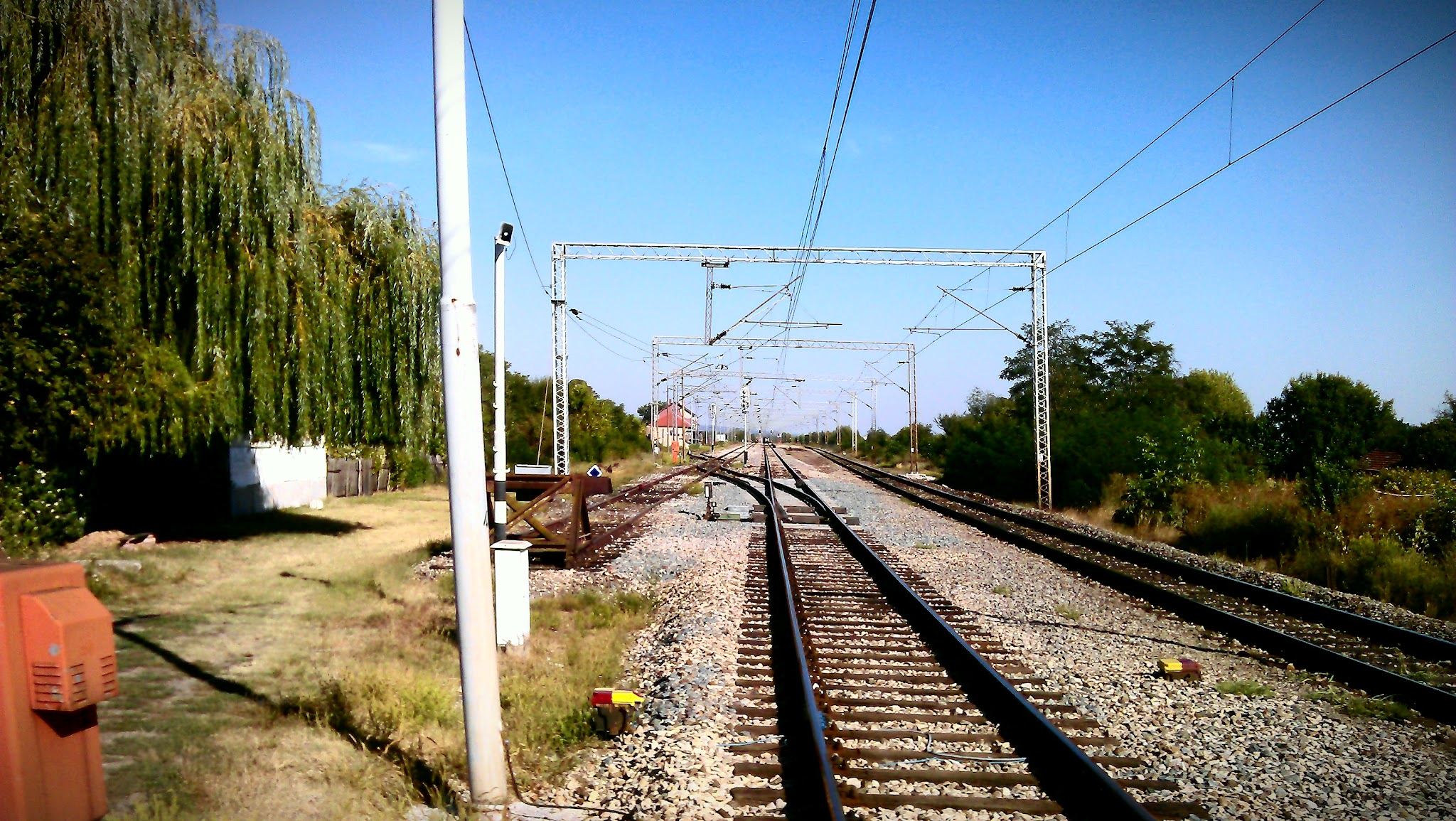
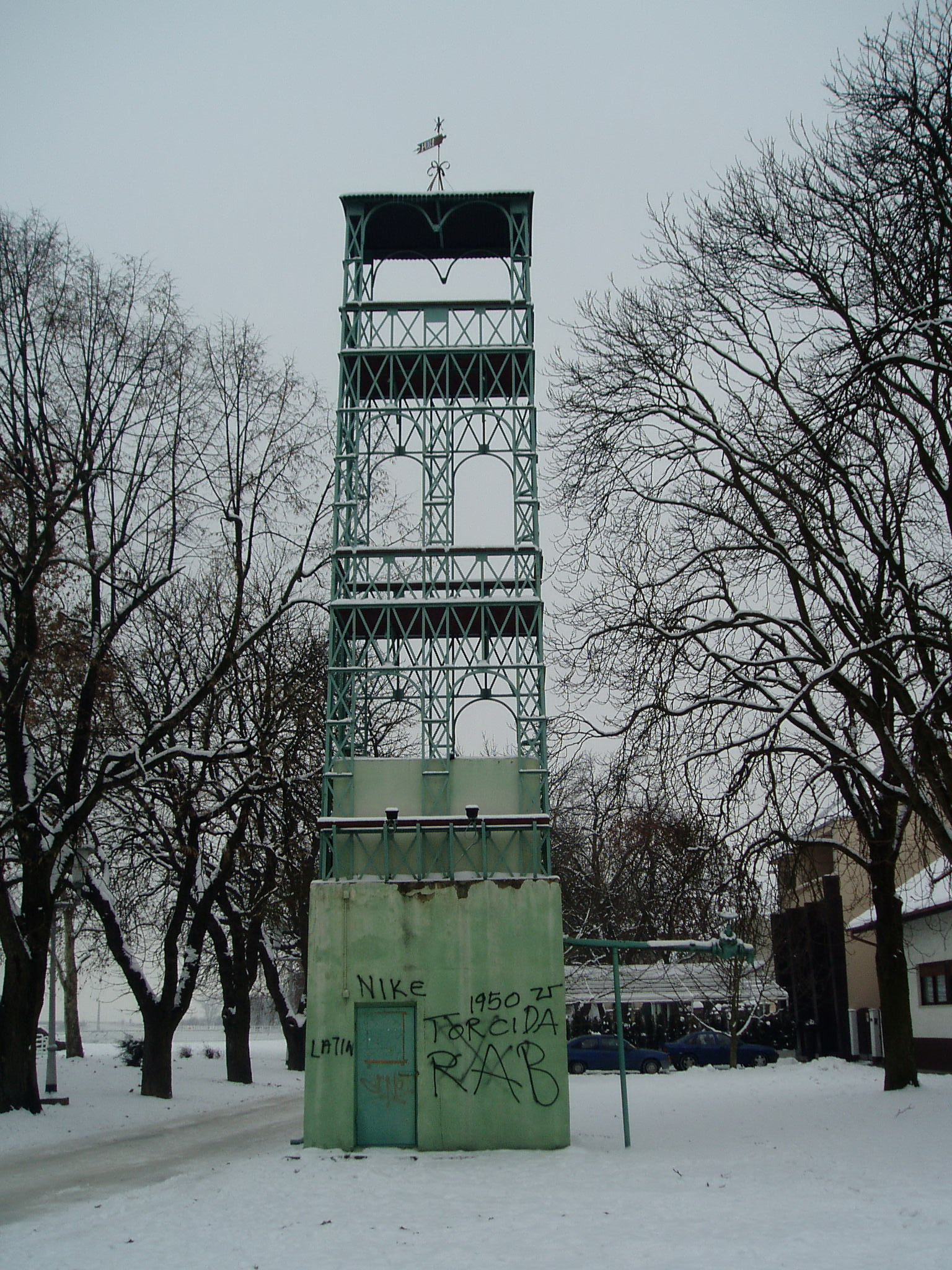
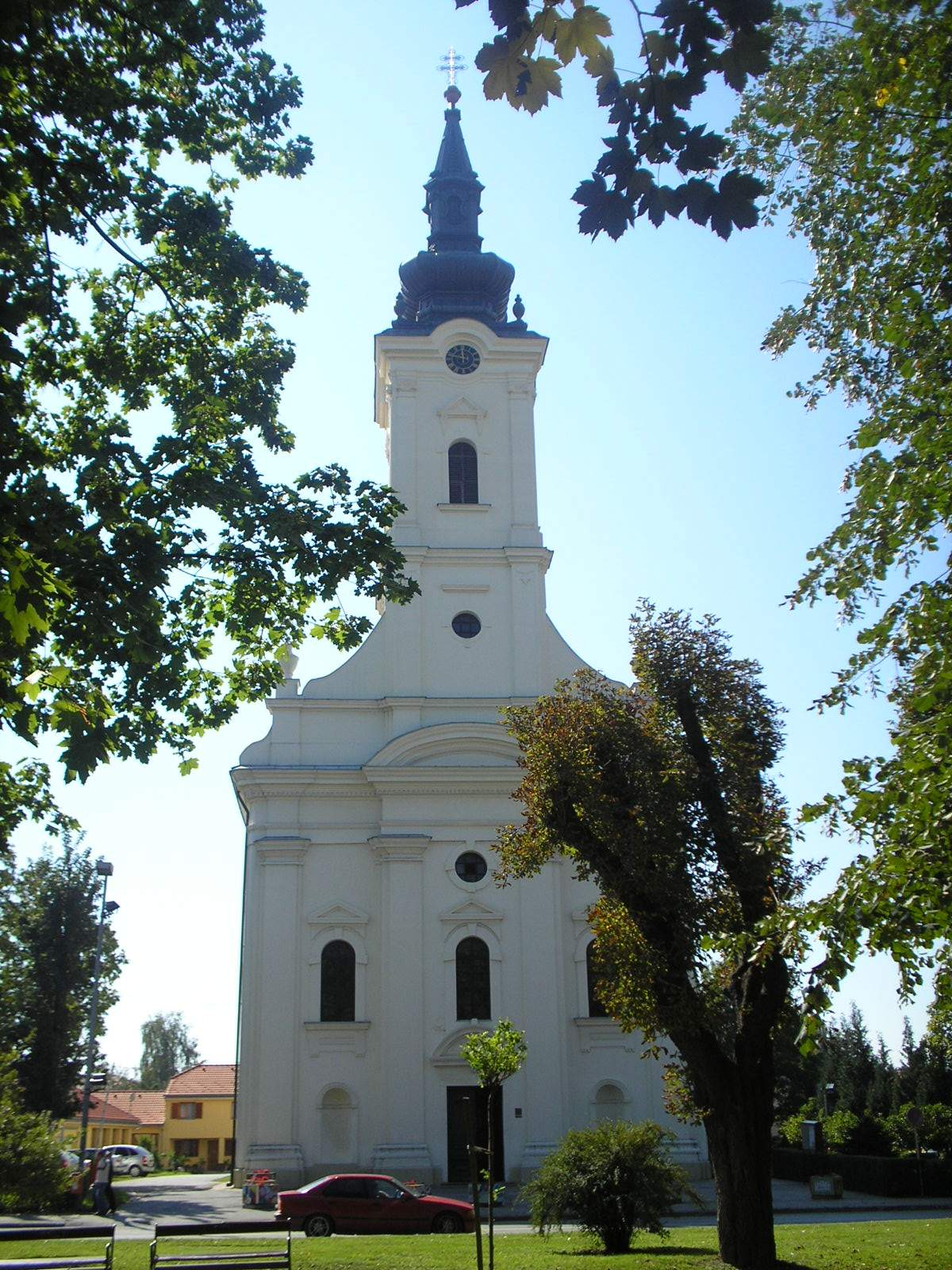
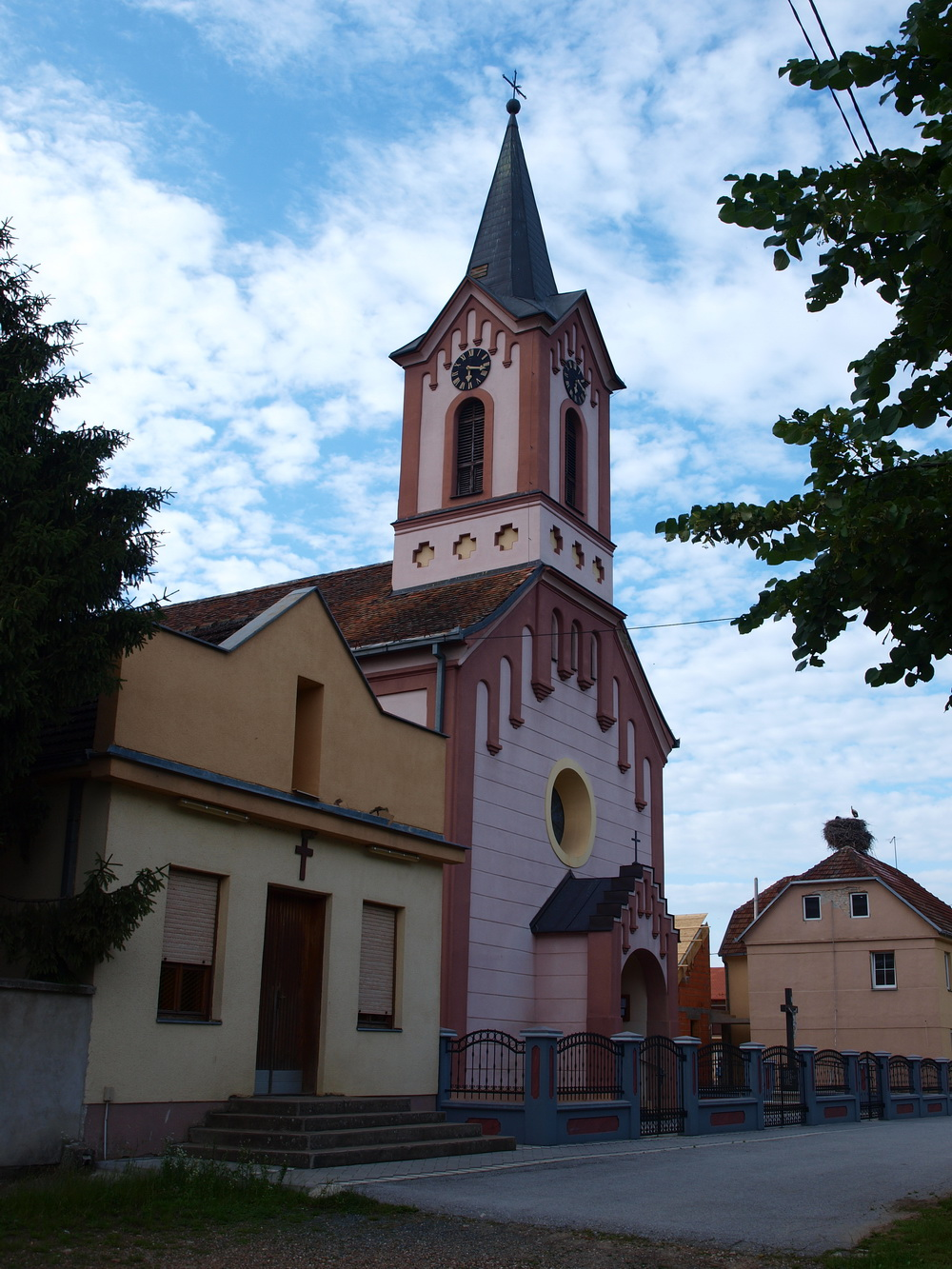
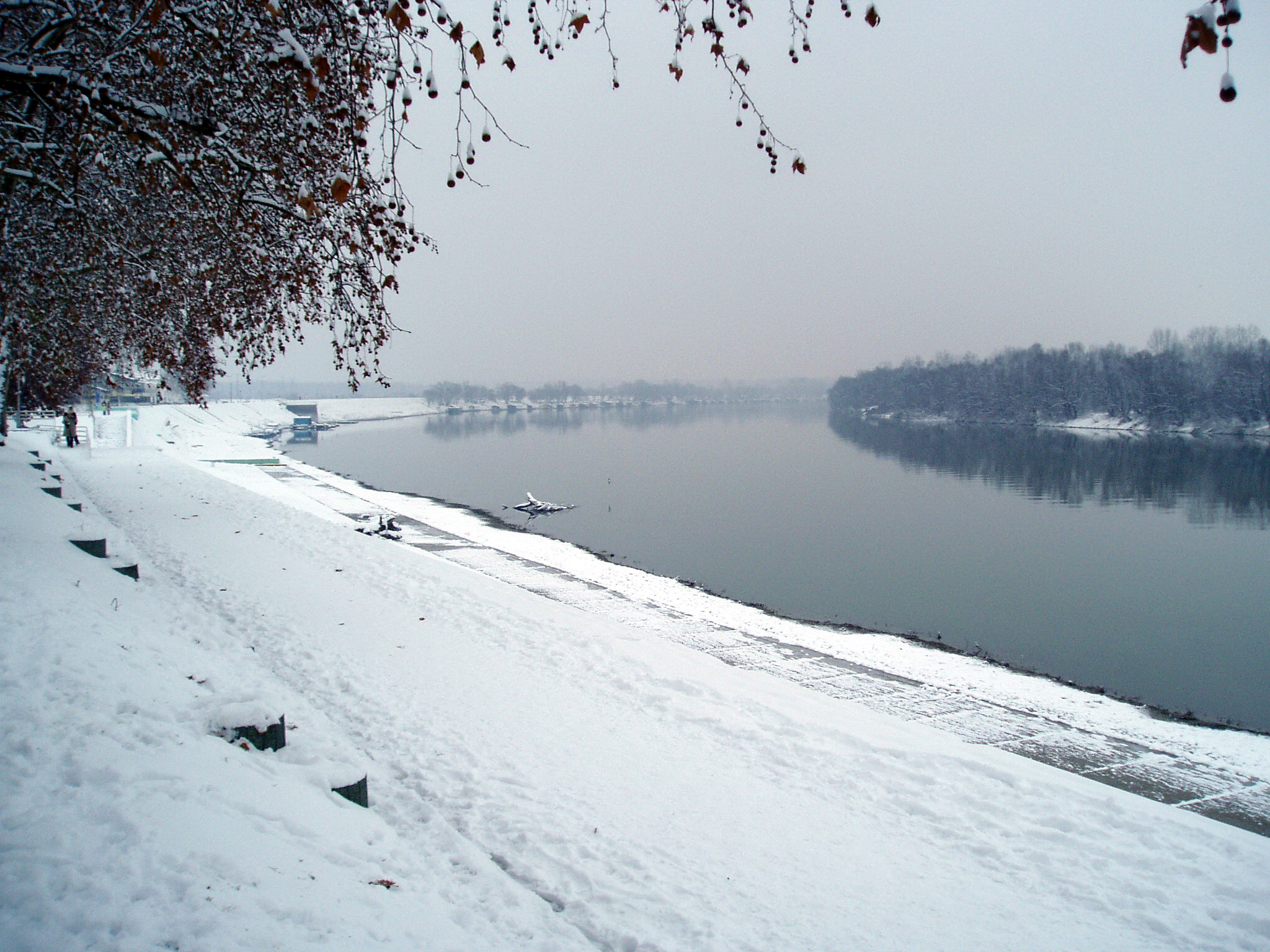
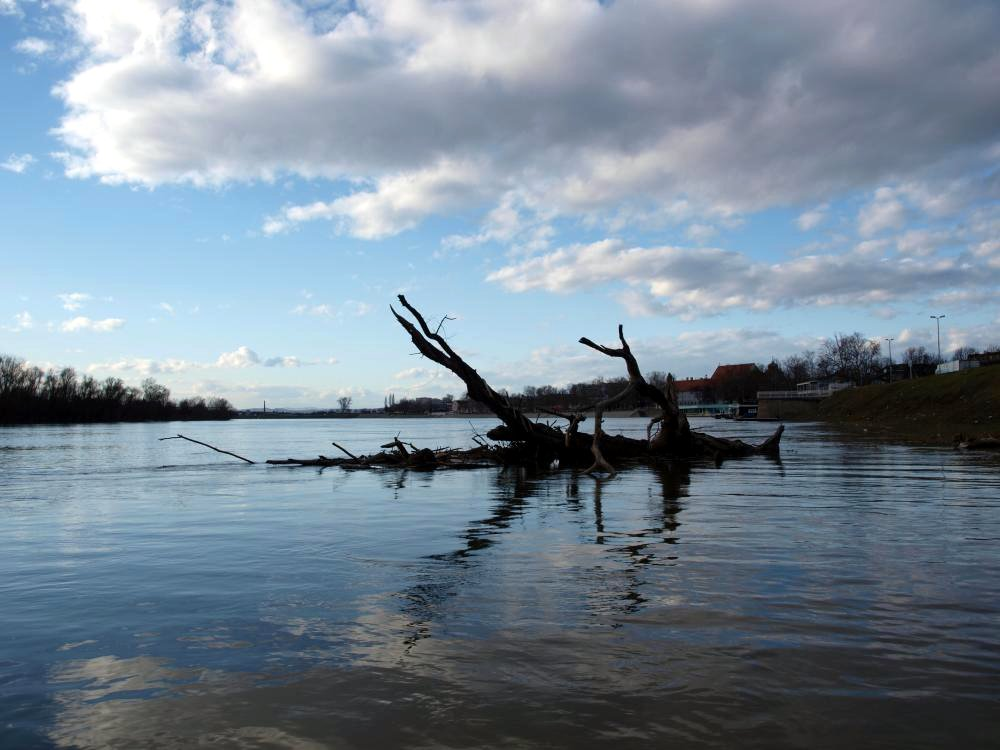
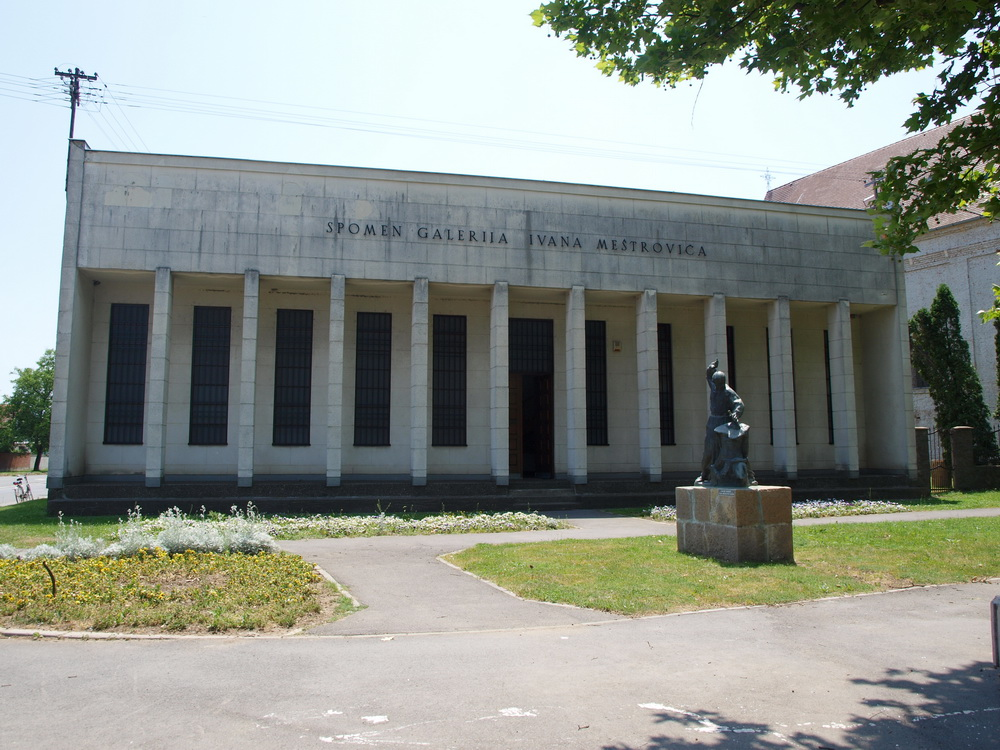
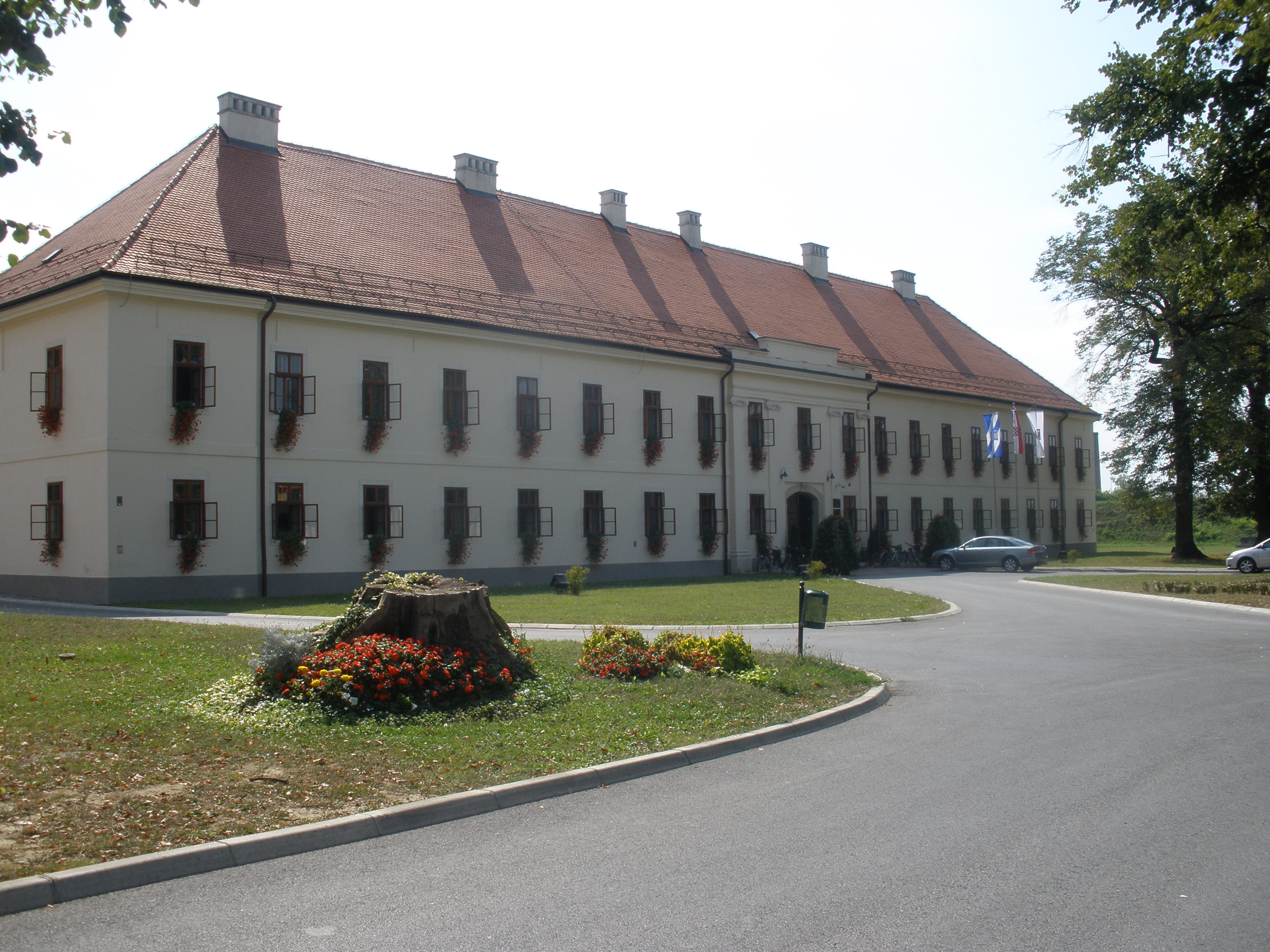

- Flag Coat of arms

- Brod-Posavina County within Croatia
- Country: Croatia
- County seat: Slavonski Brod

Government
  - Župan (Prefect): Danijel Marušić (HDZ)

Area
  - Total: 2,030 km^{2} (780 sq mi)

Population (2021)
  - Total: 130,267
  - Density: 64.2/km^{2} (166/sq mi)
- Area code: 035
- ISO 3166 code: HR-12
- HDI (2022): 0.828 very high · 18th
- Website: www.bpz.hr

Brod-Posavina County (Croatian: Brodsko-posavska županija) is the southern Slavonian county in Croatia. Its center is the city of Slavonski Brod and it spreads along the left bank of the Sava river, hence the name Posavina. Other notable towns include Nova Gradiška.

== Geography ==
The Brod-Posavina County borders on the Sisak-Moslavina County in the west, Požega-Slavonia County in the north, Osijek-Baranja County in the northeast, and Vukovar-Syrmia County in the east.

== Administrative divisions ==
Brod-Posavina County is further divided into 2 towns (grad, pl. gradovi) and 26 municipalities (općina, pl. općine).

Towns
Town	Population (2021 census)
Slavonski Brod	49,891
Nova Gradiška	11,690

Municipalities
Municipality	Population (2021 census)
Bebrina	2,817
Brodski Stupnik	2,357
Bukovlje	2,727
Cernik	2,964
Davor	2,529
Donji Andrijevci	3,059
Dragalić	1,058
Garčin	3,951
Gornja Vrba	2,168
Gornji Bogićevci	1,428
Gundinci	1,610
Klakar	2,020
Nova Kapela	3,393
Okučani	2,323
Oprisavci	1,968
Oriovac	4,770
Podcrkavlje	2,207
Rešetari	3,852
Sibinj	5,730
Sikirevci	2,028
Slavonski Šamac	1,576
Stara Gradiška	911
Staro Petrovo Selo	4,110
Velika Kopanica	2,621
Vrbje	1,691
Vrpolje	2,818

== Demographics ==
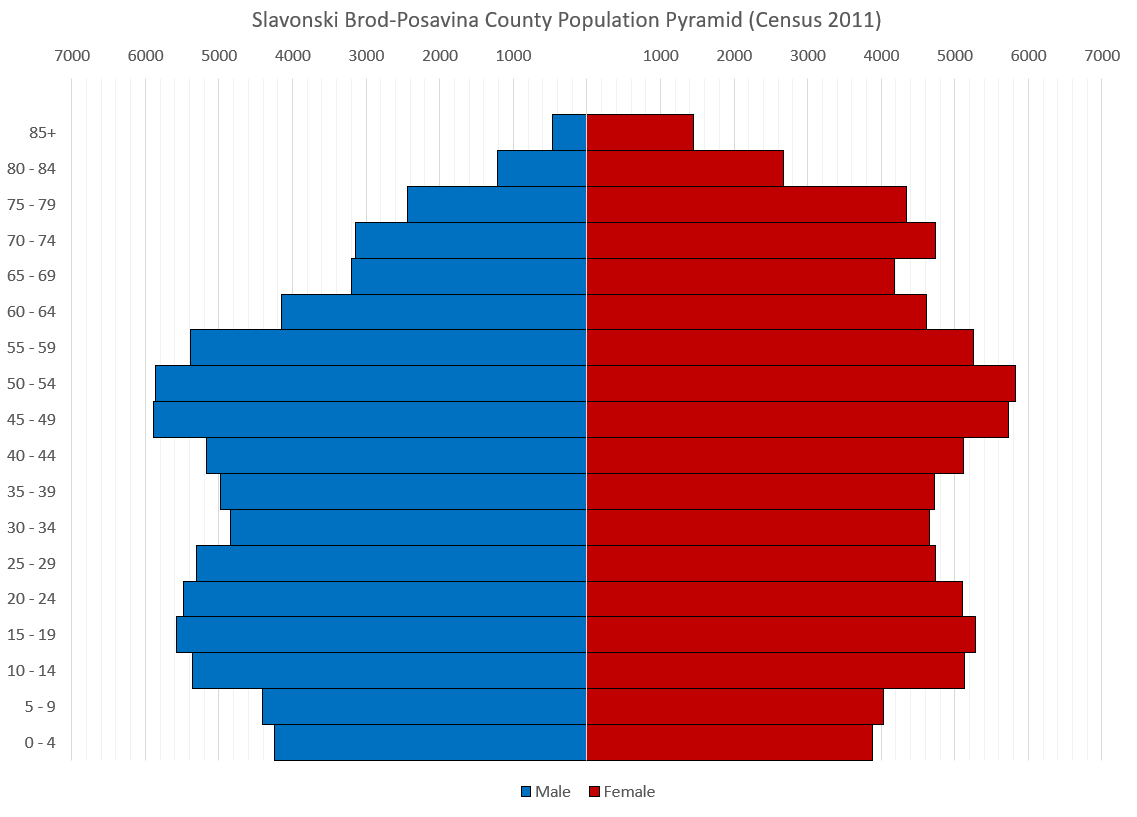
Population pyramid of Brod-Posavina county per the 2011 Census

Historical populations of Brod-Posavina County

Year	Pop.	±%
1857	74,136	—
1869	79,273	+6.9%
1880	77,739	−1.9%
1890	90,751	+16.7%
1900	99,979	+10.2%
1910	116,295	+16.3%
1921	112,693	−3.1%
1931	128,790	+14.3%
1948	134,436	+4.4%

Year	Pop.	±%
1953	142,614	+6.1%
1961	154,309	+8.2%
1971	164,065	+6.3%
1981	167,667	+2.2%
1991	174,998	+4.4%
2001	176,765	+1.0%
2011	158,575	−10.3%
2021	130,267	−17.9%

Source: Naselja i stanovništvo Republike Hrvatske 1857–2001, Croatian Bureau of Statistics, Zagreb, 2005

As of the 2021 census, the county had 130,267 residents. The population density was 64 people per km^{2}.

As of the 2011 census, the county had 158,575 residents. The population density was 78 people per km^{2}.

Brod-Posavina County: Population trends 1857–2021
v

population	74136	79273	77739	90751	99979	116295	112693	128790	134436	142614	154309	164065	167667	174998	176765	158575	130267
	1857	1869	1880	1890	1900	1910	1921	1931	1948	1953	1961	1971	1981	1991	2001	2011	2021

Sources: Croatian Bureau of Statistics publications

Ethnic Croats form the overwhelming majority of the county. The 2011 census recorded Croats at 95.0% of the population, followed by Serbs at 2.6%.

== Politics ==
=== County Assembly ===
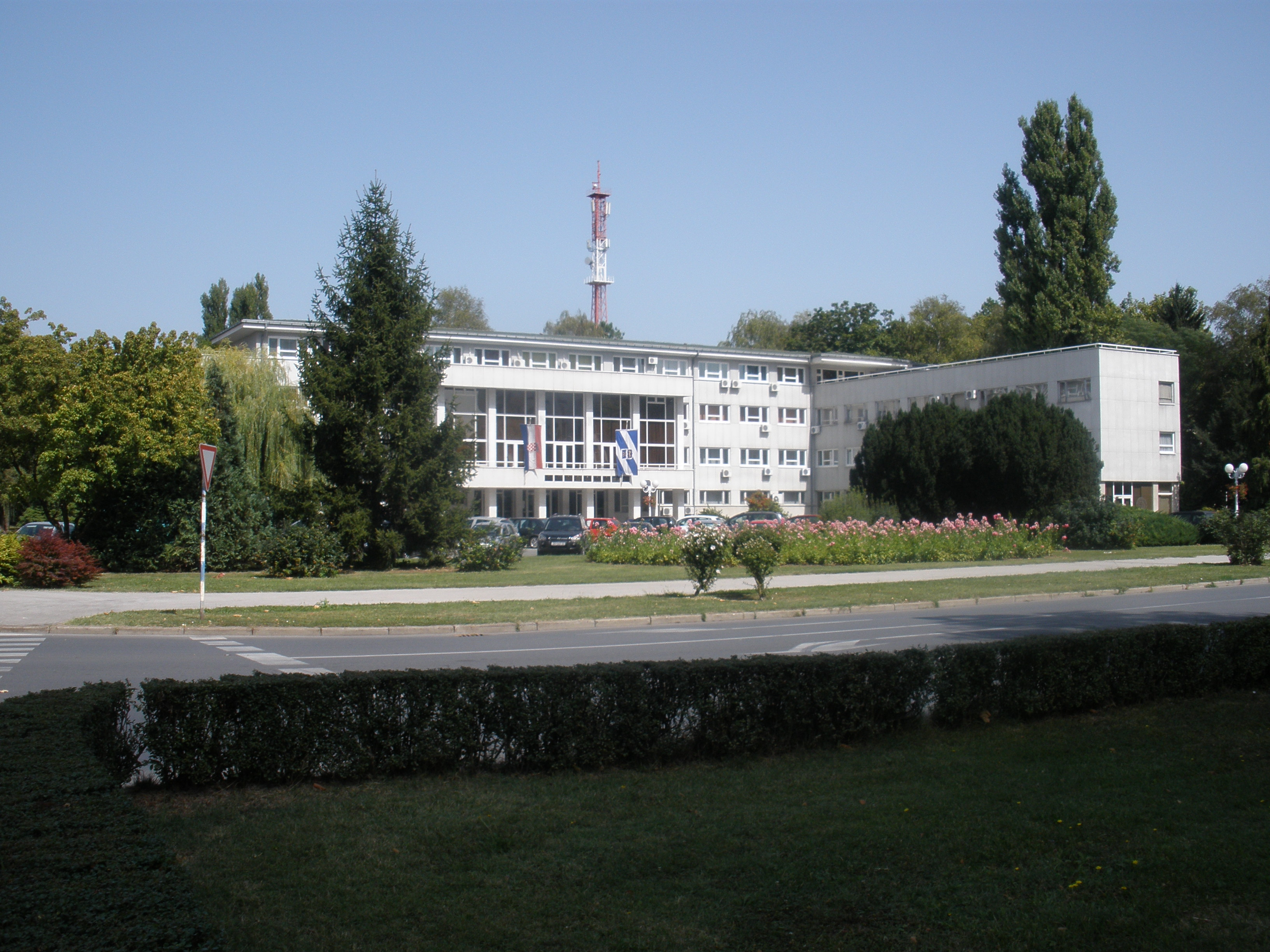
Brod-Posavina County Headquarters

Following the 2025 Croatian local elections the Assembly of the Brod-Posavina County was composed of 37 elected representatives. Out of a total of 125,464 eligible voters 52,433 (41.79%) participated in the elections and 52,413 (41.78%) submitted their ballots. There were 49,984 (95.37%) valid and 2,429 (4.63%) invalid ballots.

The Croatian Democratic Union got 21,368 (42.74%) ballots and 17 elected representatives. The Independent Politician Mirko Duspara got 11,570 (23.14%) ballots and 9 elected representatives. The Croatian Peasant Party in coalition with Croatian Party of Rights, Croatian Social Liberal Party, The Bridge, Bolje sutra Independent List, Croatian Sovereignists, Party of Pensioners and Croatian People's Party – Liberal Democrats got 6,402 (12.80%) ballots and 5 elected representatives. The Social Democratic Party of Croatia got 5,909 ballots (11.82%) and 4 elected representatives. Homeland Movement got 3,751 ballots (7.50%) and 2 elected representatives. Law and Justice got 984 ballots (1.96%) which was under the threshold to enter into the assembly.

Summary of the 2025 Croatian local elections
Party	Votes	%	Seats
Croatian Democratic Union	21,368	42.74	17
Independent Politician Mirko Duspara List	11,570	23.14	9
Croatian Peasant Party; Croatian Party of Rights; Croatian Social Liberal Party; The Bridge; Bolje sutra Independent List; Croatian Sovereignists; Party of Pensioners; Croatian People's Party – Liberal Democrats	6,402	12.80	5
Social Democratic Party of Croatia	5,909	11.82	4
Homeland Movement	3,751	7.50	2
Law and Justice	984	1.96	0
Invalid/blank votes	2,429	4.63	—
Total	52,413	100	—
Registered voters/turnout	125,464	41.78	—
Source: (in Croatian)

=== Minority councils and representatives ===
Directly elected minority councils and representatives are tasked by local or regional authorities with advocating for minority rights and interests, integration into public life and participation in the management of local affairs. During the 2023 Croatian national minorities councils and representatives elections, Roma and Serbs of Croatia elected 25 minority members of councils for Brod-Posavina County while Albanians, Bosniaks and Ukrainians of Croatia elected individual representatives. Certain municipalities, towns or cities in the county elected their own local minority councils and representatives as well.
