= Reformed Church, Kopačevo =

Reformed Church
- Reformatska crkva u Kopačevu; Kopácsi református templom
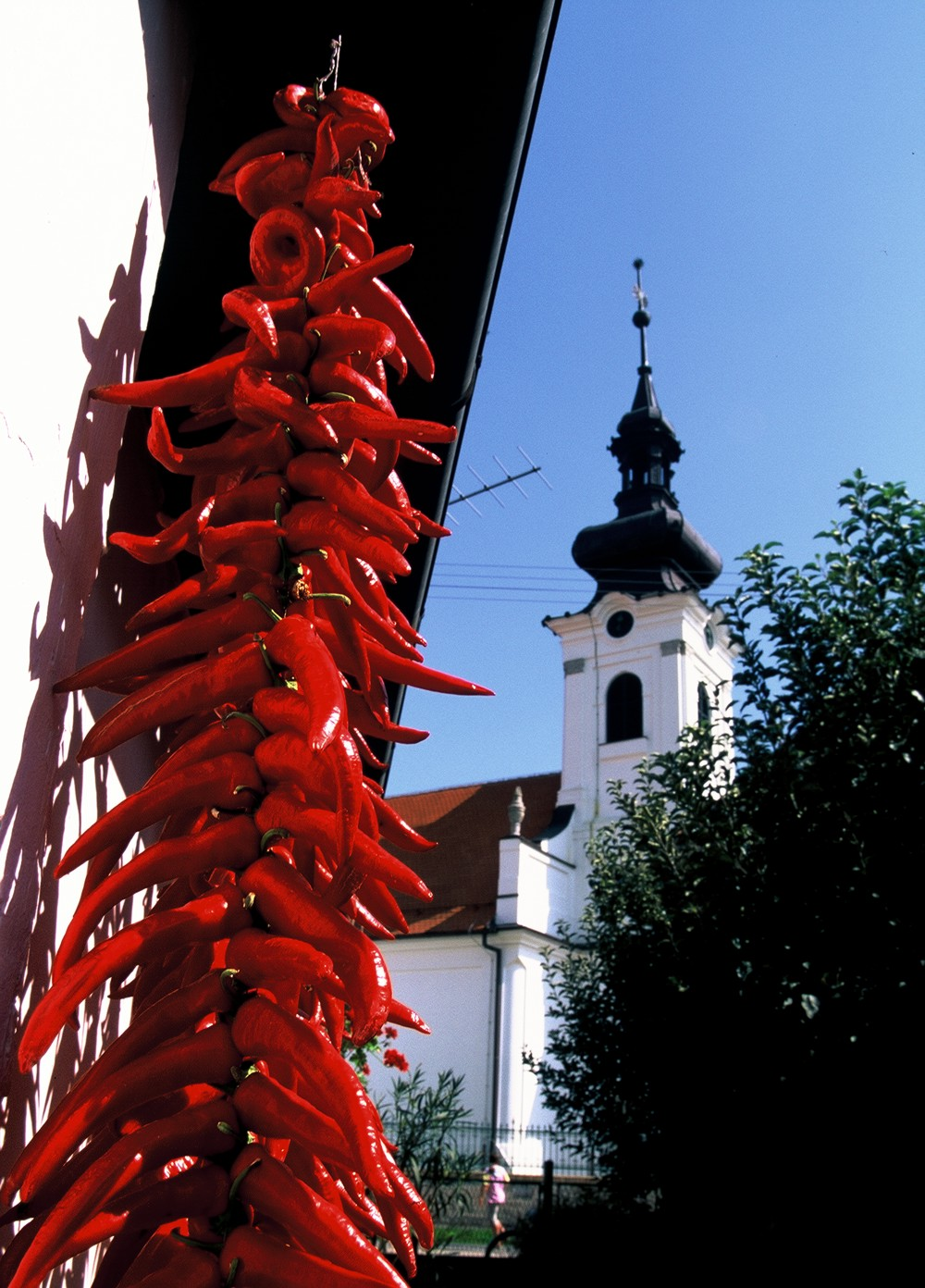
- The church building
- Reformed Church
- 45°35′59″N 18°47′18″E
- Location: Kopačevo, Bilje
- Country: Croatia
- Language: Hungarian language
- Denomination: Disputed between Reformed Christian Calvinist Church in Croatia and Protestant Reformed Christian Church in Croatia

Architecture
- Functional status: active
- Years built: 1804-1808

The Reformed Church (Croatian: Reformatska crkva u Kopačevu, Hungarian: Kopácsi református templom) in Kopačevo is a Reformed Christian Calvinist affiliated church serving primarily Hungarian community in the parish. Parish doctrine is grounded in the Second Helvetic Confession and the Heidelberg Catechism. Adherents of this tradition are often referred to as Calvinists, named after the prominent Geneva reformer John Calvin. The Reformed Church in Kopačevo is the largest Reformed church in Baranya by seating capacity, with 890 seats. As of 2022, the parish has around 400 members. Kopačevo is also the seat of the Bishop’s Office of the Reformed Christian Church of Hungarians in Croatia.

== History ==
The Reformed parish of Kopačevo in Baranja has existed since the time of the Reformation in the 16th century. An earlier wooden church burned down in 1666 and was replaced by a new building that underwent several later expansions. The foundations of the present church were laid in 1804, and the church was consecrated in 1808.

== See also ==
- Hungarian Reformed Communion
- Reformed Christian Church in Yugoslavia
- Reformed Church, Suza
- Reformed Church, Kneževi Vinogradi
- Reformed Church, Kotlina
- Reformed Church, Kamenac
- Reformed Church, Karanac
- Reformed Church, Vardarac
