= Reformed Church, Karanac =

Reformed Church
- Reformatska crkva u Karancu; Karancsi református templom
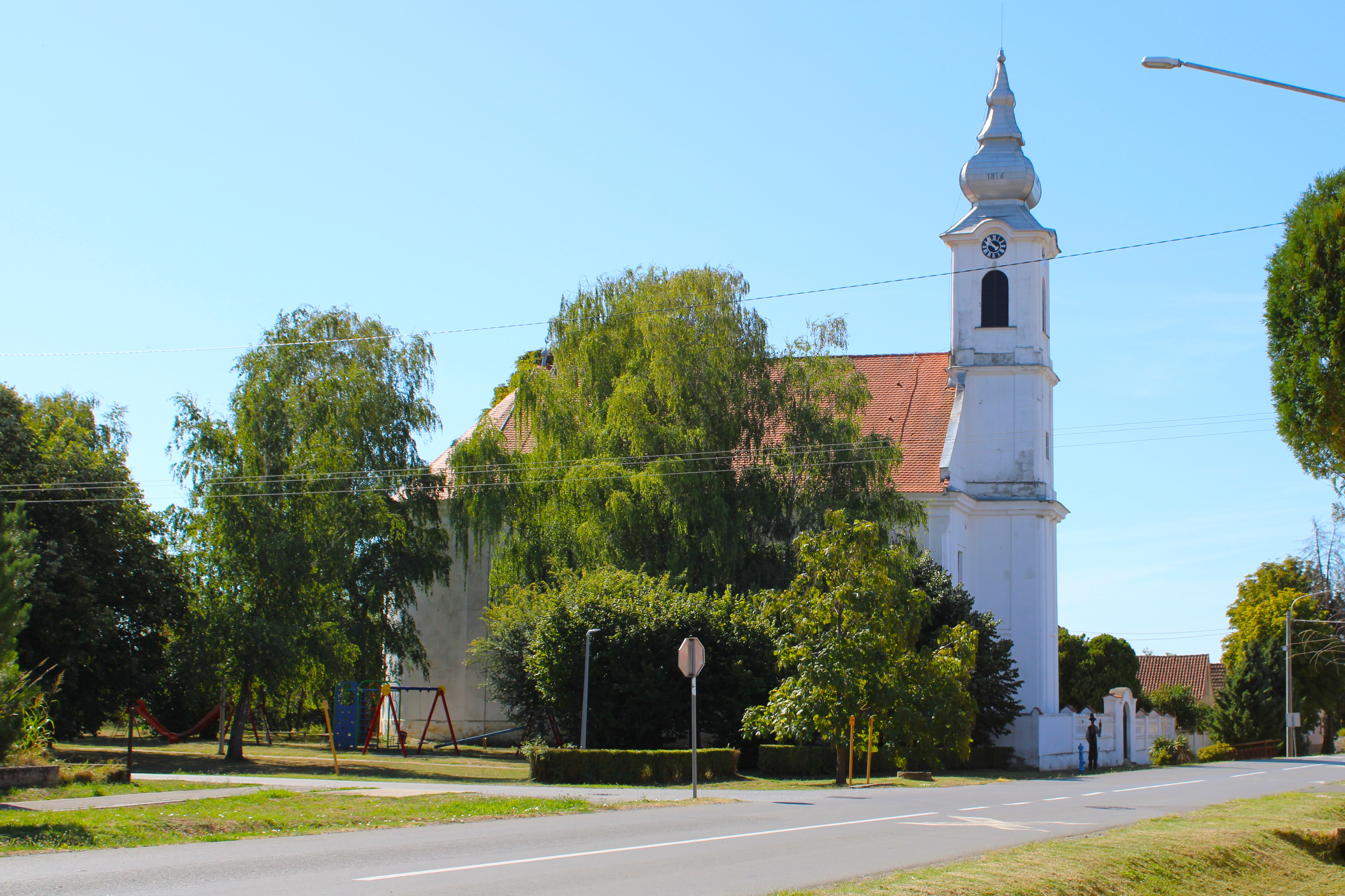
- The church building
- Reformed Church
- 45°45′32″N 18°41′10″E
- Location: Kolodvorska 104, Karanac, Kneževi Vinogradi
- Country: Croatia
- Language: Hungarian language
- Denomination: Disputed between Reformed Christian Calvinist Church in Croatia and Protestant Reformed Christian Church in Croatia

Architecture
- Functional status: active
- Years built: 1808-1816

The Reformed Church (Croatian: Reformatska crkva u Karancu, Hungarian: Karancsi református templom) in Karanac is a Reformed Christian Calvinist affiliated church serving primarily Hungarian community in the parish. Parish doctrine is grounded in the Second Helvetic Confession and the Heidelberg Catechism. Adherents of this tradition are often referred to as Calvinists, named after the prominent Geneva reformer John Calvin. The church is a single-nave, longitudinal structure built in 1816, featuring a semicircular apse and a prominent bell tower.

== History ==
Historical records indicate that a Reformed church existed in Karanac as early as 1576, even though the village was not yet located at the exact same land as today. The first known parish pastor was István Karantsi. During Ottoman rule, an incident occurred when a priest repaired a loose church door without permission and was fined for doing it. Before the present building, another church stood on the same site, dating from the late 17th or early 18th century. By the early 19th century, this structure was too small for the growing congregation of 874 members. A parish house, constructed in 1861, is located to the south of the church.

== See also ==
- Church of St. Stefan Štiljanović, Karanac
- Hungarian Reformed Communion
- Reformed Christian Church in Yugoslavia
- Reformed Church, Suza
- Reformed Church, Kneževi Vinogradi
- Reformed Church, Kotlina
- Reformed Church, Kamenac
- Reformed Church, Vardarac
