= Reformed Church, Vardarac =

Reformed Church
- Reformatska crkva u Vardaracu; Várdaróci református templom
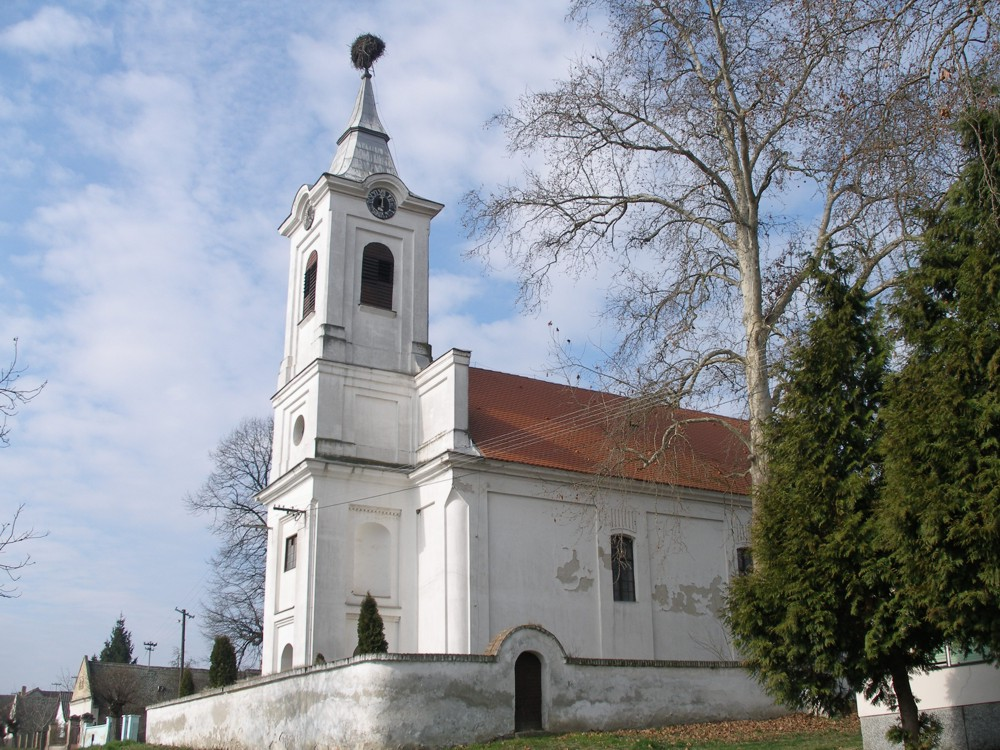
- The church building
- Reformed Church
- 45°37′29″N 18°46′24″E
- Location: Lajos Kossuth Street 71a, Vardarac, Bilje
- Country: Croatia
- Language: Hungarian language
- Denomination: Disputed between Reformed Christian Calvinist Church in Croatia and Protestant Reformed Christian Church in Croatia

Architecture
- Functional status: active
- Years built: 1812-1829

The Reformed Church (Croatian: Reformatska crkva u Vardarcu, Hungarian: Várdaróci református templom) in Vardarac is a Reformed Christian Calvinist affiliated church serving primarily Hungarian community in the parish. Parish doctrine is grounded in the Second Helvetic Confession and the Heidelberg Catechism. Adherents of this tradition are often referred to as Calvinists, named after the prominent Geneva reformer John Calvin.

== History ==
The parish of Vardarac adopted the Reformation in the 16th century. Although a church likely existed in the settlement prior to the Reformation, no preserved documents provide information about it. Construction of the present church building began in 1812 and was completed in 1829. The structure was expanded in 1867. In June 1957, a storm accompanied by a lightning strike destroyed the church tower, after which a temporary tower was erected. Reconstruction of the original tower was completed in 2018. The reopening of the tower was attended by president of the Democratic Union of Hungarians of Croatia Róbert Jankovics, State Secretary at the Croatian Ministry of Culture Krešimir Partl, Hungarian Consul General in Osijek Antonio De Blasio and mayor of Bilje Željko Cickaj.

== See also ==
- Hungarian Reformed Communion
- Reformed Christian Church in Yugoslavia
- Reformed Church, Suza
- Reformed Church, Kneževi Vinogradi
- Reformed Church, Kotlina
- Reformed Church, Kamenac
- Reformed Church, Karanac
- Reformed Church, Kopačevo
