= Reformed Church, Suza =

Reformed Church
- Reformatska crkva u Suzi; Csúzai református templom
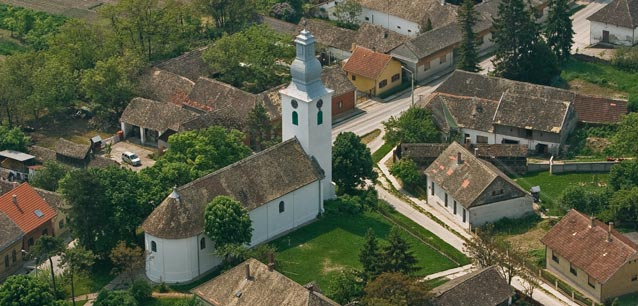
- The church building
- Reformed Church
- 45°46′53″N 18°46′29″E
- Location: Maršala Tita 54, Suza, Kneževi Vinogradi
- Country: Croatia
- Language: Hungarian language
- Denomination: Disputed between Reformed Christian Calvinist Church in Croatia and Protestant Reformed Christian Church in Croatia

Architecture
- Functional status: active
- Years built: 1806

The Reformed Church (Croatian: Reformatska crkva u Suzi, Hungarian: Csúzai református templom) in Suza is a Reformed Christian Calvinist affiliated church serving primarily Hungarian community in the parish. Parish doctrine is grounded in the Second Helvetic Confession and the Heidelberg Catechism. Adherents of this tradition are often referred to as Calvinists, named after the prominent Geneva reformer John Calvin.

== History ==
At the turn of the 13th to 14th century, the first church on this site was built in the Gothic style. In preserved written sources the church was mentioned for the first time in 1301. The later Reformed church was constructed on its remains.

The Reformed Church congregation in Suza was founded during the Reformation when the village population converted in 1544. The teachings of the Reformation movement in Slavonia and Baranya spread through the preaching of Mihael Starin, who, over a period of six to seven years around 1544, established roughly 120 Hungarian and Croatian Protestant parishes. There are no preserved written sources about the church during the period of the Ottoman Hungary. The contemporary church was built in 1806.

In the Reformed cemetery lies the pastor Gedeon Ács (1799-1887), who, as a participant in the Hungarian Revolution of 1848, accompanied its leader Lajos Kossuth into exile in Ottoman Empire and later to United States of America. He returned home in 1861 and lived and served in Suza as a Reformed minister until his death. The church building got its present appearance in 1869.

In 1886, the parish counted 877 members, by 1915 the number was 785, and in 1971 it had decreased to 294 believers. During the First World War, two of its three bells were taken away, and in the 1930s the villagers purchased new ones to replace them.

After the end of United Nations Transitional Administration for Eastern Slavonia, Baranja and Western Sirmium mandate in 1998, the onion-shaped tower dome and the tower itself were restored, along with the church roof and exterior façades. As of 2025 around 250 members of the Reformed faith live in the area, all of Hungarian nationality.

== See also ==
- Hungarian Reformed Communion
- Reformed Christian Church in Yugoslavia
- Reformed Church, Kotlina
- Reformed Church, Kneževi Vinogradi
- Reformed Church, Karanac
- Reformed Church, Kamenac
- Reformed Church, Vardarac
