= Reformed Church, Kamenac =

Reformed Church
- Reformatska crkva u Kamencu; Kői református templom
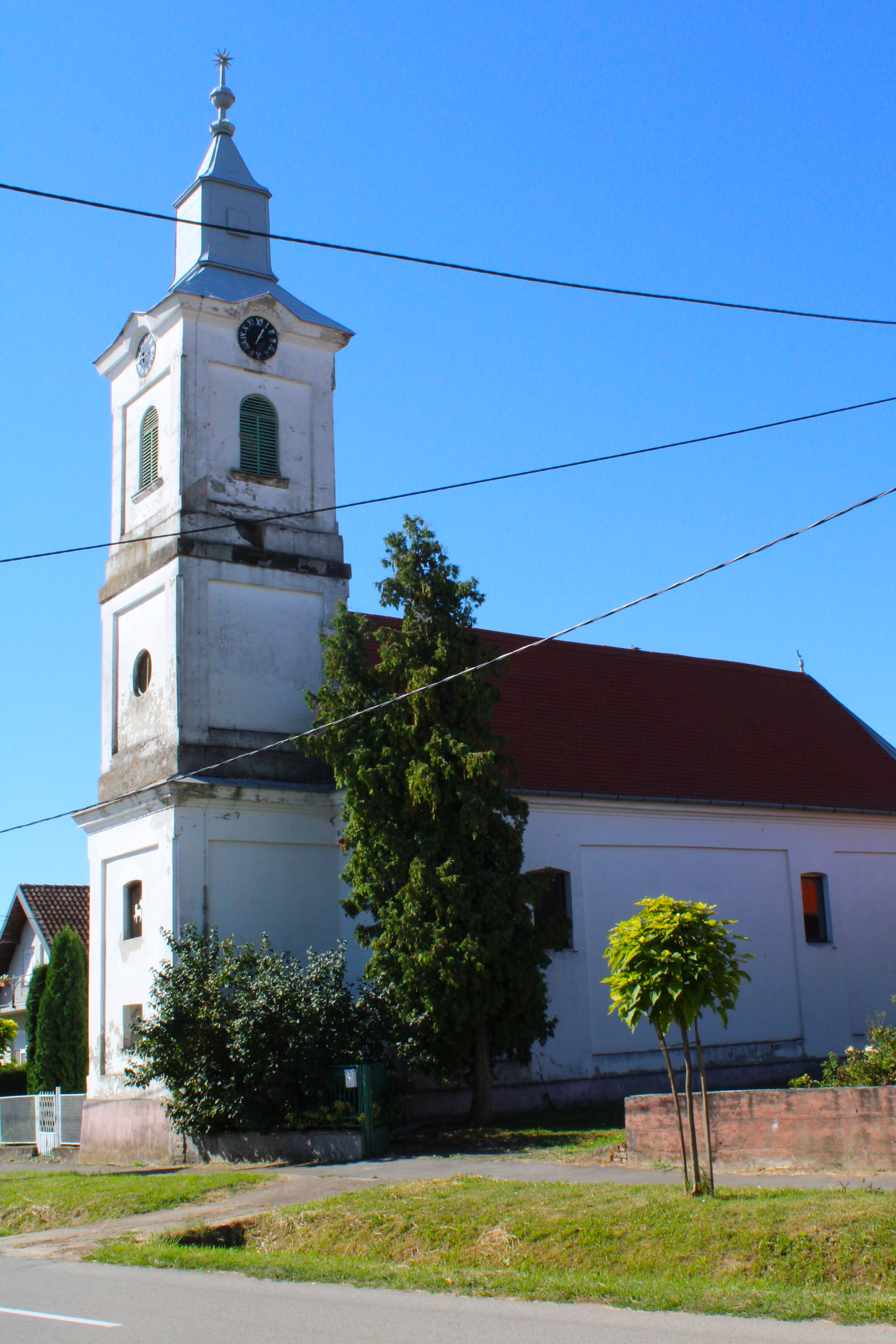
- The church building
- Reformed Church
- 45°46′06″N 18°42′21″E
- Location: Glavna 55, Kamenac, Kneževi Vinogradi
- Country: Croatia
- Language: Hungarian language
- Denomination: Disputed between Reformed Christian Calvinist Church in Croatia and Protestant Reformed Christian Church in Croatia

Architecture
- Functional status: active
- Years built: unknown (before 1859 fire)

The Reformed Church (Croatian: Reformatska crkva u Kamencu, Hungarian: Kői református templom) in Kamenac is a Reformed Christian Calvinist affiliated church serving primarily Hungarian community in the parish. Parish doctrine is grounded in the Second Helvetic Confession and the Heidelberg Catechism. Adherents of this tradition are often referred to as Calvinists, named after the prominent Geneva reformer John Calvin.

== History ==
The exact date of the church’s original construction is unknown as all parish church and all its documentation were completely destroyed by fire in 1859. Since early 2000s the church building is a subject of disputed between Reformed Christian Calvinist Church in Croatia and Protestant Reformed Christian Church in Croatia.

== See also ==
- Hungarian Reformed Communion
- Reformed Christian Church in Yugoslavia
- Reformed Church, Suza
- Reformed Church, Kneževi Vinogradi
- Reformed Church, Kotlina
- Reformed Church, Karanac
- Reformed Church, Vardarac
