= Reformed Church, Kotlina =

Reformed Church
- Reformatska crkva u Kotlini; Sepsei református templom
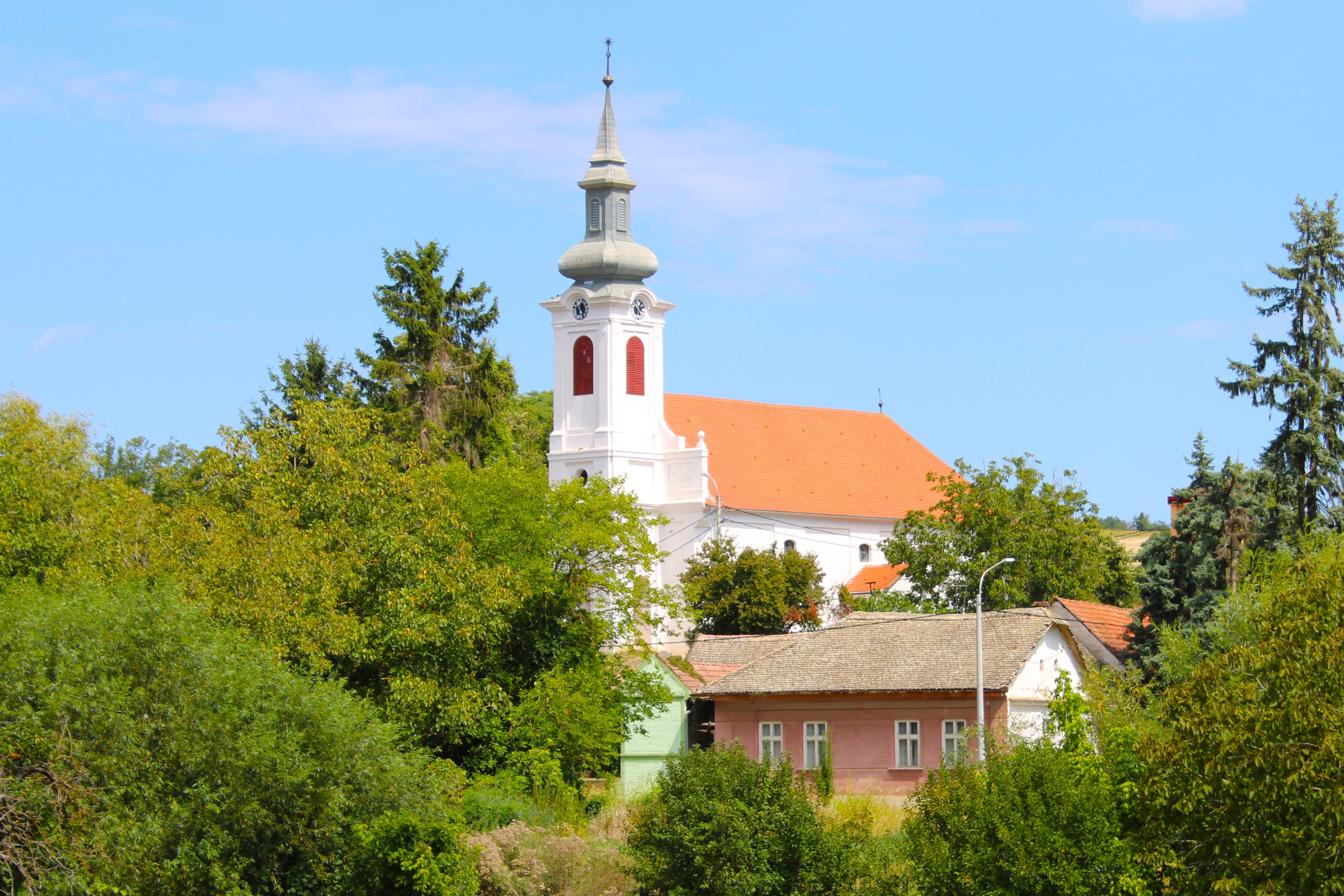
- The church building
- Reformed Church
- 45°47′30″N 18°44′05″E
- Location: Glavna 110, Kotlina, Kneževi Vinogradi
- Country: Croatia
- Language: Hungarian language
- Denomination: Disputed between Reformed Christian Calvinist Church in Croatia and Protestant Reformed Christian Church in Croatia

Architecture
- Functional status: active
- Years built: 1803-1806

The Reformed Church (Croatian: Reformatska crkva u Kotlini, Hungarian: Sepsei református templom) in Kotlina is a Reformed Christian Calvinist affiliated church serving primarily Hungarian community in the parish. Parish doctrine is grounded in the Second Helvetic Confession and the Heidelberg Catechism. Adherents of this tradition are often referred to as Calvinists, named after the prominent Geneva reformer John Calvin. The Reformed Church in Kotlina stands on an elevated plateau reached by a brick-paved staircase. The parish house is located south of the church. It was built in 1853 and expanded in 1884.

== History ==
The exact date of the founding of the Reformed community in Kotlina is unknown, though it is assumed to have been established in the early 17th century. The old reformed church burned down completely in 1803 and the construction of the new church at the new site lasted between 1803 and 1806. Major works were carried out in 1856, 1882 and 1963. The tower was renovated and was replastered in 1984 while the whole roof was replaced in 2005 with interior renovations in 2006.

Since 1999 internal schism the Reformed church property in Kotlina, similarly to other parish churces in the region, has been the subject of a long-running dispute between two religious organizations, the Reformed Christian Church of Hungarians in Croatia and the Reformed Christian Calvinist Church in Croatia. The disagreement concerns the legal status of the local church and parish buildings, as well as the validity of earlier changes in land-registry records. A Constitutional Court of Croatia decision in 2023 annulled a previous judgment and returned the case for renewed proceedings without determining ownership.

== See also ==
- Hungarian Reformed Communion
- Reformed Christian Church in Yugoslavia
- Reformed Church, Suza
- Reformed Church, Kneževi Vinogradi
- Reformed Church, Karanac
- Reformed Church, Kamenac
- Reformed Church, Vardarac
