= Reformed Christian Church =

Reformed Christian Church may refer to:

- Reformed Christianity, also known as the Reformed Church or Calvinism, a major branch of Protestantism
- Three Calvinist churches which branched from the Reformed Church in Hungary after World War I:
  - Reformed Christian Church in Slovakia
  - Reformed Christian Church in Slovenia
  - Reformed Christian Church in Serbia, formerly the Reformed Church in Yugoslavia
- Reformed Christian Calvinist Church in Croatia, a Calvinist church which separated from the Reformed Christian Church in Serbia following the dissolution of Yugoslavia
- Protestant Reformed Christian Church in Croatia, a Reformed Episcopal church which separated from the Reformed Christian Calvinist Church in Croatia in 2001

== See also ==
- RCC (disambiguation)
