= Reformed Church, Kneževi Vinogradi =

Reformed Church
- Reformatska crkva u Kneževim Vinogradima; Hercegszöllősi
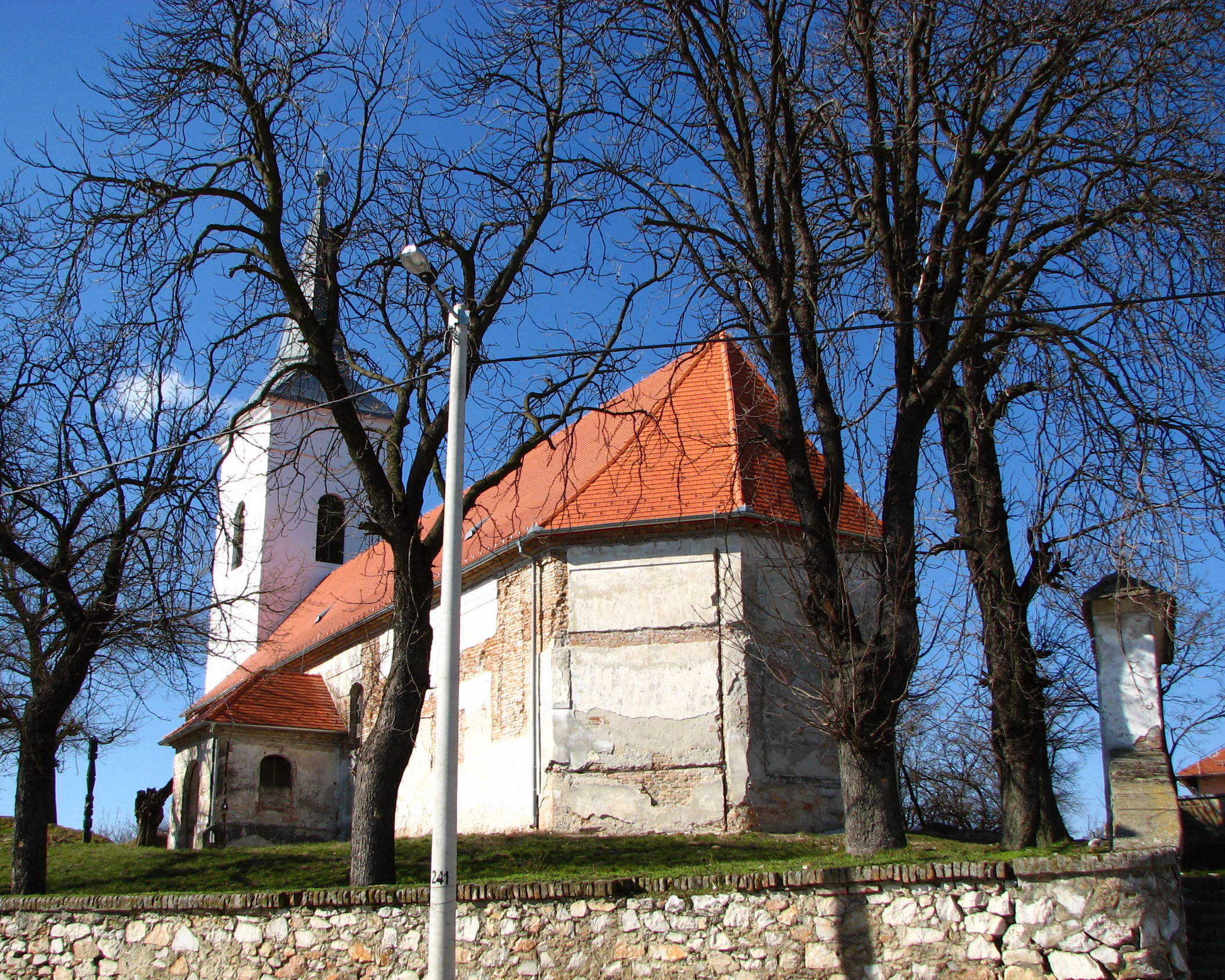
- The church building
- Reformed Church
- 45°45′06″N 18°44′04″E
- Location: Olgina 26, Kneževi Vinogradi
- Country: Croatia
- Language: Hungarian language
- Denomination: Disputed between Reformed Christian Calvinist Church in Croatia and Protestant Reformed Christian Church in Croatia

Architecture
- Functional status: active
- Years built: 1803 (church site since antiquity)

The Reformed Church (Croatian: Reformatska crkva U Kneževim Vinogradima, Hungarian: Hercegszöllősi református templom) in Kneževi Vinogradi is a Reformed Christian Calvinist affiliated church serving primarily Hungarian community in the parish. Parish doctrine is grounded in the Second Helvetic Confession and the Heidelberg Catechism. Adherents of this tradition are often referred to as Calvinists, named after the prominent Geneva reformer John Calvin. It is the oldest church building in Baranya region. It was declared a cultural monument of the Socialist Republic of Croatia on December 17, 1976.

== History ==
The foundations of the church tower were laid by the Romans around the year 300 making it the oldest church in Baranya region. The earliest western part of the church was likely built in the 13th century, though the sanctuary from that period is unknown.

=== 1576 Synod of Kneževi Vinogradi ===
In 1576, it hosted a historic synod attended by 40 preachers where the “Canons of Kneževi Vinogradi” were adopted, rules regulating the life of Reformed believers in the region. The synod took place on 16 and 17 August. It is considered the first synod of the Helvetic (Reformed/Calvinist) confession held on the territory of present-day Croatia as an earlier synod in Tordinci in 1551 took place before the Helvetic confession became dominant among Protestant churches in this region. It is regarded as the founding moment of the Danube Reformed Diocese based in Budapest, which still bears the year 1576 on its seal.

=== Ottoman conquest of Pannonia ===
The church was damaged in the battles against the Ottomans in 1687, struck by lightning in 1722, and completely burned down. It was only modestly restored ten years later, with a thatched roof. A more serious restoration was undertaken in 1803 when it was rebuilt in its current shape.

== See also ==
- Hungarian Reformed Communion
- Reformed Christian Church in Yugoslavia
- Reformed Church, Kotlina
- Reformed Church, Suza
- Reformed Church, Karanac
- Reformed Church, Kamenac
- Reformed Church, Vardarac
