= Kopačevo =

Kopačevo Kopács
- Village (Selo)
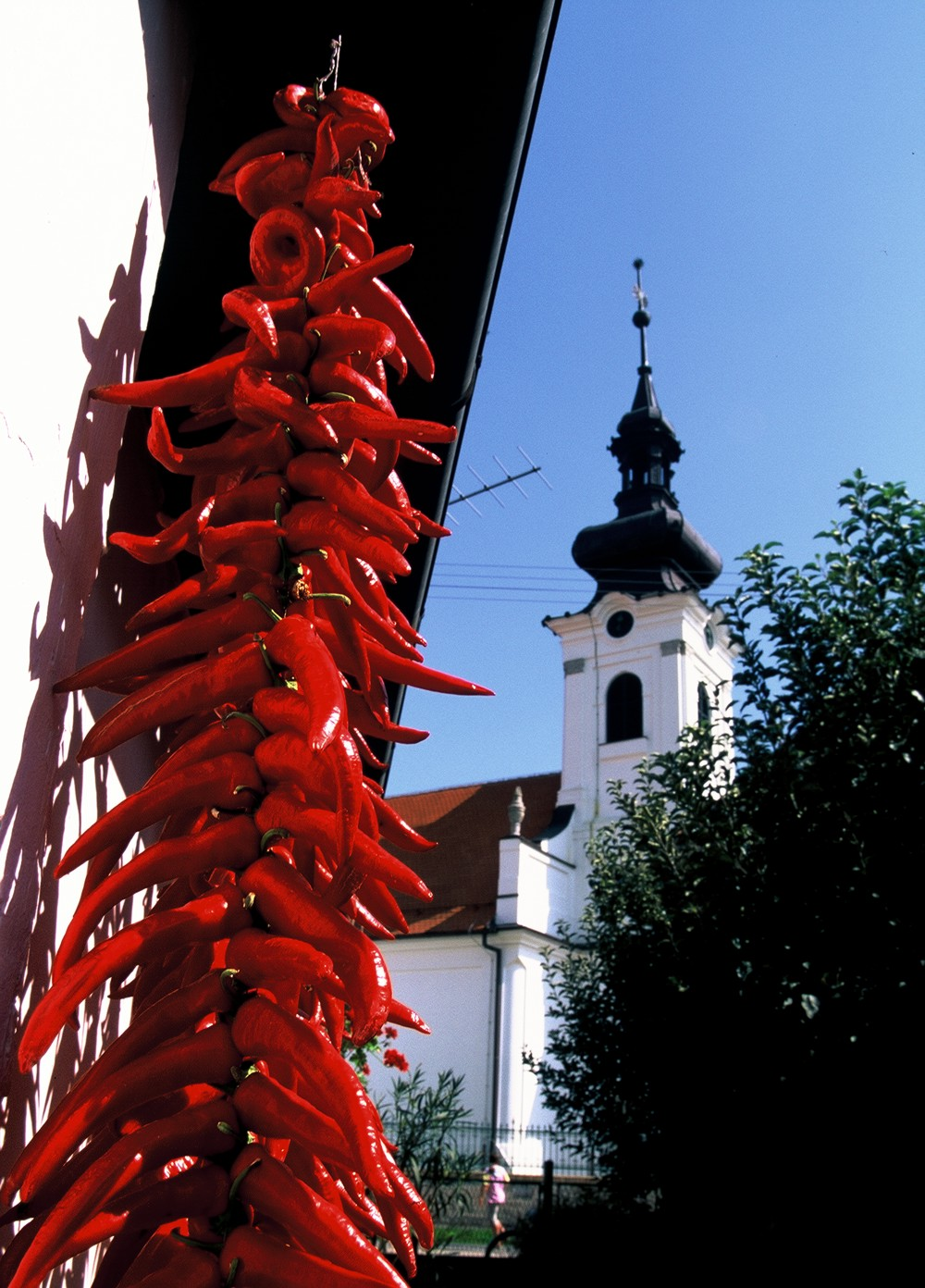
- Reformed Church in Kopačevo

- Location of Kopačevo in Croatia Kopačevo (Croatia) Kopačevo (Europe)
- Coordinates: 45.602°N 18.786°E
- Country: Croatia
- Region: Baranya (Podunavlje)
- County: Osijek-Baranja County
- Municipality: Bilje

Area
  - Total: 142.5 km^{2} (55.0 sq mi)

Population (2021)
  - Total: 460
  - Density: 3.2/km^{2} (8.4/sq mi)
- Time zone: UTC+1 (CET)
  - Summer (DST): UTC+2 (CEST)

Kopačevo (Hungarian: Kopács) is a settlement in the region of Baranja, Croatia. Administratively, it is located in the Bilje municipality within the Osijek-Baranja County. Population is 608 people.

== History ==
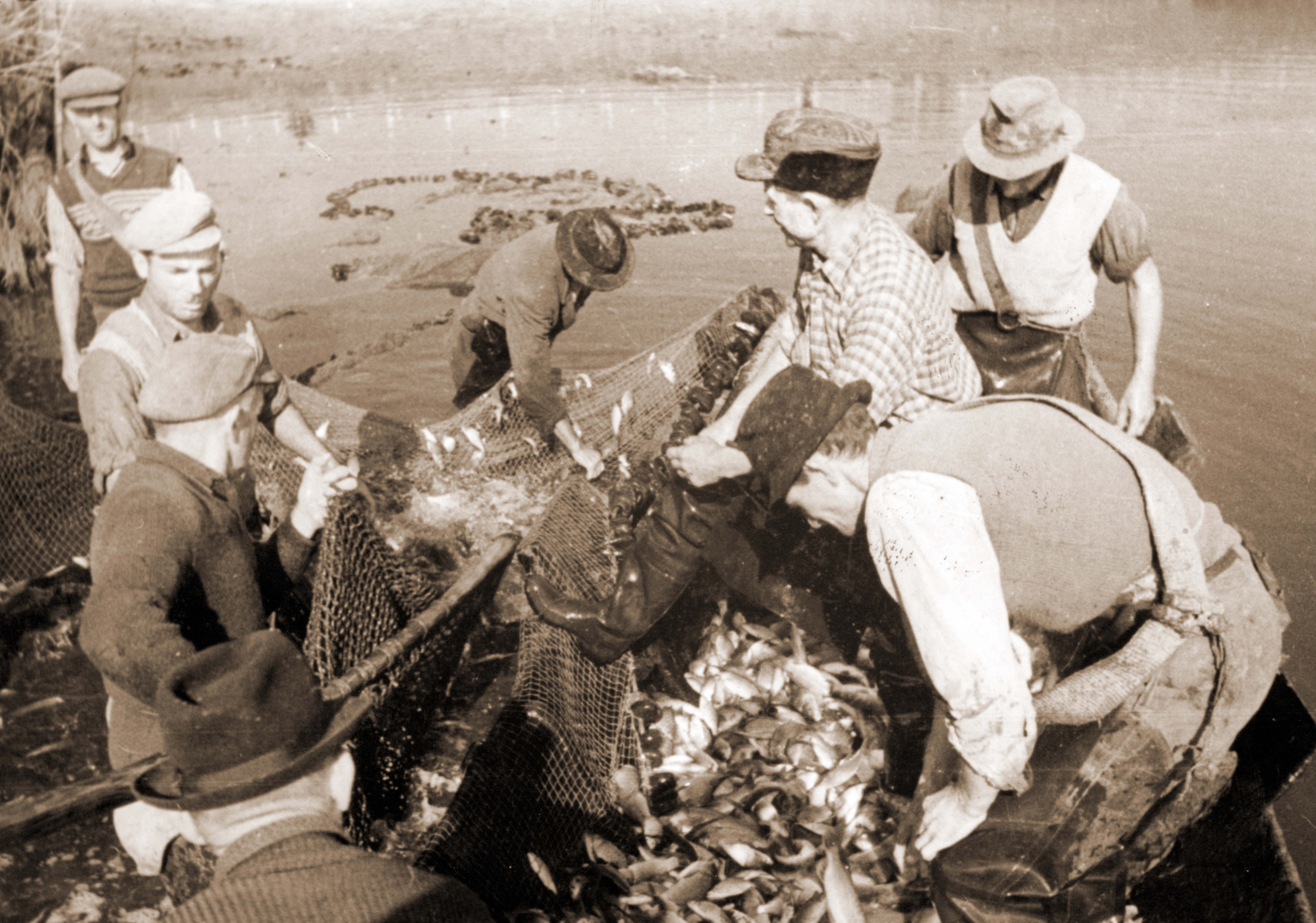

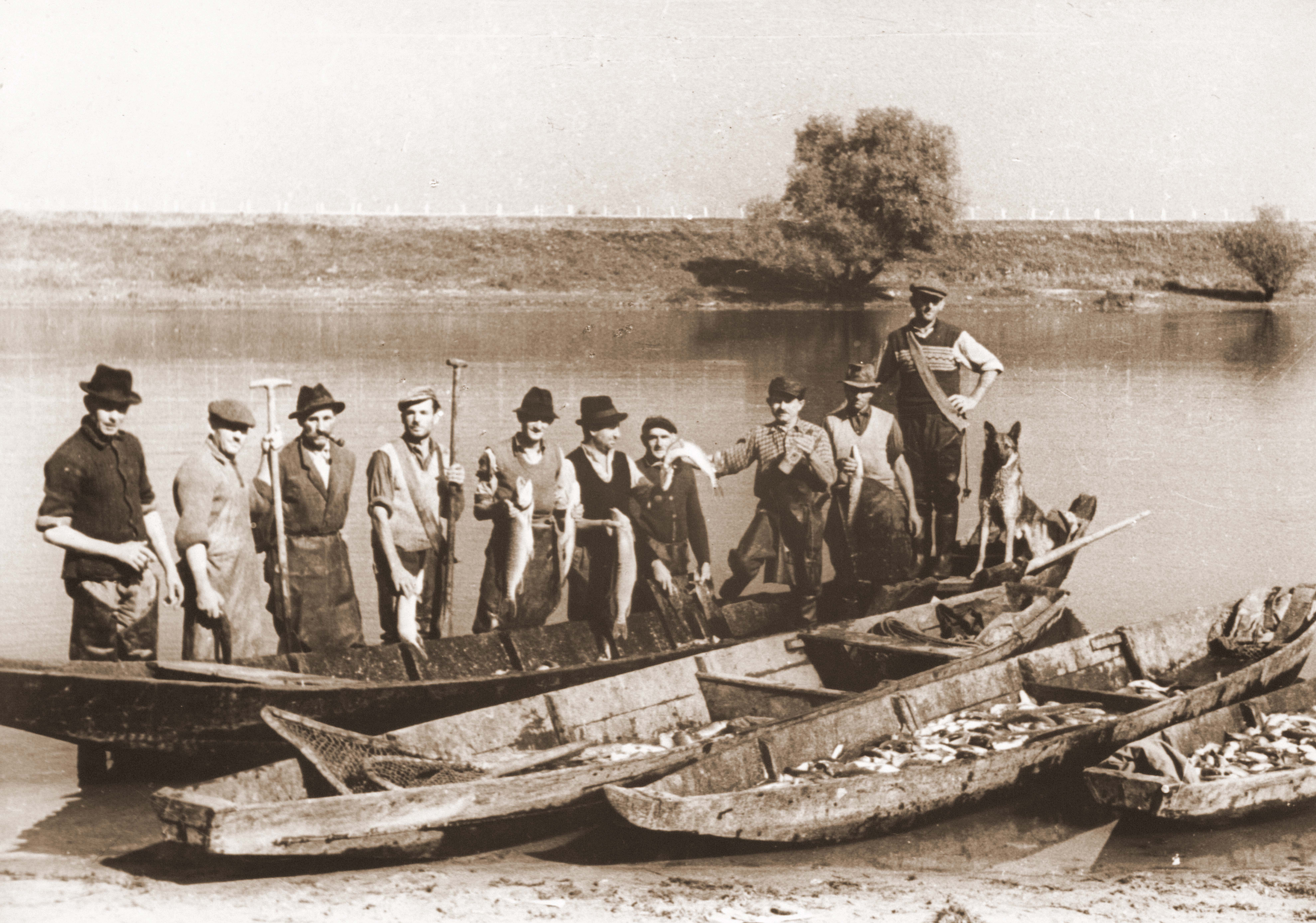

In classical antiquity location of present-day village was a part of a long Roman Danubian Limes three grave areals which were researched by archaeologists from Hungary before World War II, but two of them were destroyed in 1950 due to the dam construction. One necropolis was dated in the Late Antique period.

First historical mention of the village comes from year 1212 during the reign of Andrew III of Hungary. 1713 it is mentioned as a Hungarian village with 18 families. Village is mentioned one source from 1591 in the period of Ottoman rule over the medieval Kingdom of Hungary when it was waqf with 100 Hungarian families living on it. 1713 it is mentioned as a Hungarian village with 18 families. According to local legend, prior to the arrival of Ottomans, there was a grand castle in the village. Dravafok or Dravatorok, early 20th century steamboat port and telegraphy station, belonged to the village. According to Roman Catholic Diocese of Pécs data, village had 1203 inhabitants in 1839 and reached its peak in 1849 with 1412 inhabitants.

All up until the 1918 and establishment of Kingdom of Yugoslavia village, together with the rest of Baranya, was part of Baranya County. In 1920 post World War I Treaty of Trianon was formally signed. During the Kingdom of Yugoslavia village was within the Danube Banovina. In World War II after the Invasion of Yugoslavia it was part of Kingdom of Hungary. Socialist Federal Republic of Yugoslavia transferred the region to the Socialist Republic of Croatia.

Due to the proximity of Danube river and its backwaters fishing was an important economic activity with up to the 200 fishermen in the village at its peak. Fishermen houses used the sign of fish on the facade of their homes so that urban visitors can know that they can buy fish at that place. After the establishment of Kopački Rit nature park in 1976 fishing was limited so the importance of vegetable production increased. Village is still organizing fishing festival every September attended by up to 2,000 visitors annually.

Prior to Croatian War of Independence village had 805 inhabitants. During the war the village was within the boundaries of self-proclaimed SAO Eastern Slavonia, Baranja and Western Syrmia, Republic of Serbian Krajina and after the Erdut Agreement was signed under the United Nations Transitional Administration for Eastern Slavonia, Baranja and Western Sirmium.

== Nature ==
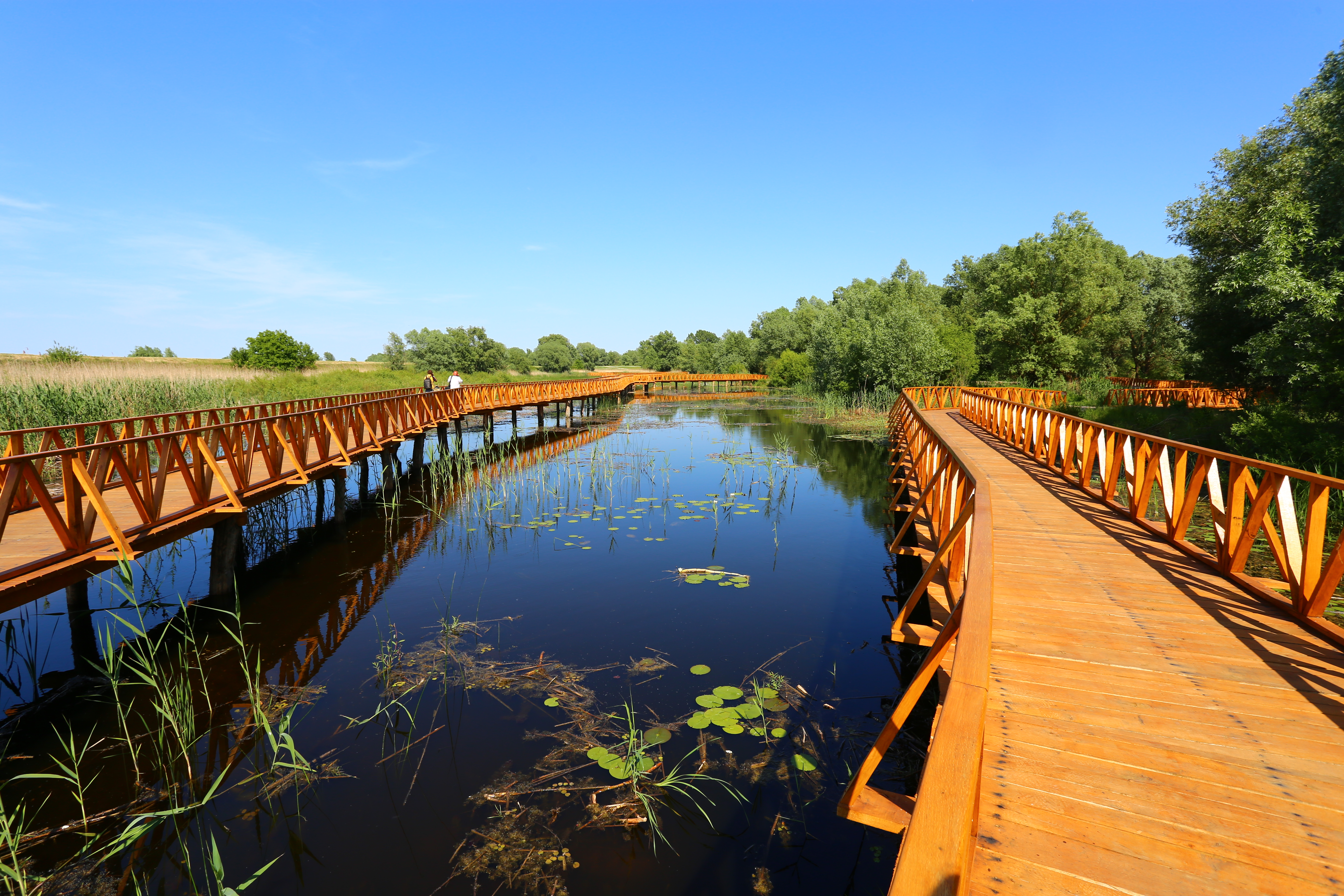
Kopački Rit

Village of Kopačevo is affected by regular flooding due to its proximity to both Danube and Drava rivers. Usually there are two floods annually, one in the spring known as a green flood, and one in August. Village is located next to the Kopački Rit, one of the most important, largest and most attractive preserved intact wetlands in Europe.

== Religion ==
Reformed Christian Calvinist Church in Kopačevo was built in the 1804-1808 period. Its current form it got in 1848 during the Hungarian Revolution of 1848. During the Croatian War of Independence church was heavily devastated. It was reconstructed in 1999 with financial support of Government of Hungary. Prior to present day church, at the same spot there was a church from the 12th century that burned in the fire in 1666. Local fold story tells that at the same location there was one even older Gothic church from the 4th century. Local population of Kopačevo was among the first to accept Calvinism in the 16th century and village became important center of Protestantism in the region.

== Twin settlements ==
- Hungary Kozármisleny
- Hungary Somberek

== See also ==
- Hungarians of Croatia
- Croatia–Hungary relations
- Croatia in the union with Hungary
- Croatian–Hungarian Settlement
- Democratic Union of Hungarians of Croatia
- Croats of Hungary
- Minority languages of Croatia
