= Reformed Christian Church in Croatia =

Reformed Christian Church in Croatia refers to two different Christian denominations in Croatia:

- Reformed Christian Calvinist Church in Croatia, a Calvinist church following the Hungarian tradition
- Protestant Reformed Christian Church in Croatia, a Reformed Episcopal church which separated from the Reformed Christian Calvinist Church in Croatia in 2001
