= Sokolovac, Osijek-Baranja County =

Coordinates: 45°42′07″N 18°47′36″E

Sokolovac Katalinpuszta (Hungarian)
- Village (Selo)
- Interactive map of Sokolovac; Katalinpuszta (Hungarian)
- Country: Croatia
- Region: Baranya (Podunavlje)
- County: Osijek-Baranja
- Municipality: Kneževi Vinogradi

Area
  - Total: 0.2 km^{2} (0.077 sq mi)

Population (2021)
  - Total: 0
  - Density: 0.0/km^{2} (0.0/sq mi)

Sokolovac (Serbian Cyrillic: Соколовац, Hungarian: Katalinpuszta) is a settlement in the region of Baranja, Croatia. Administratively, it is located in the Kneževi Vinogradi municipality within the Osijek-Baranja County. Population is 55 people.

== Ethnic groups (2001 census) ==
- 26 – Serbs
- 8 – Hungarians
- 6 – Croats
- 15 – others
