= Vardarac =

Vardarac Várdaróc
- Village (Selo)
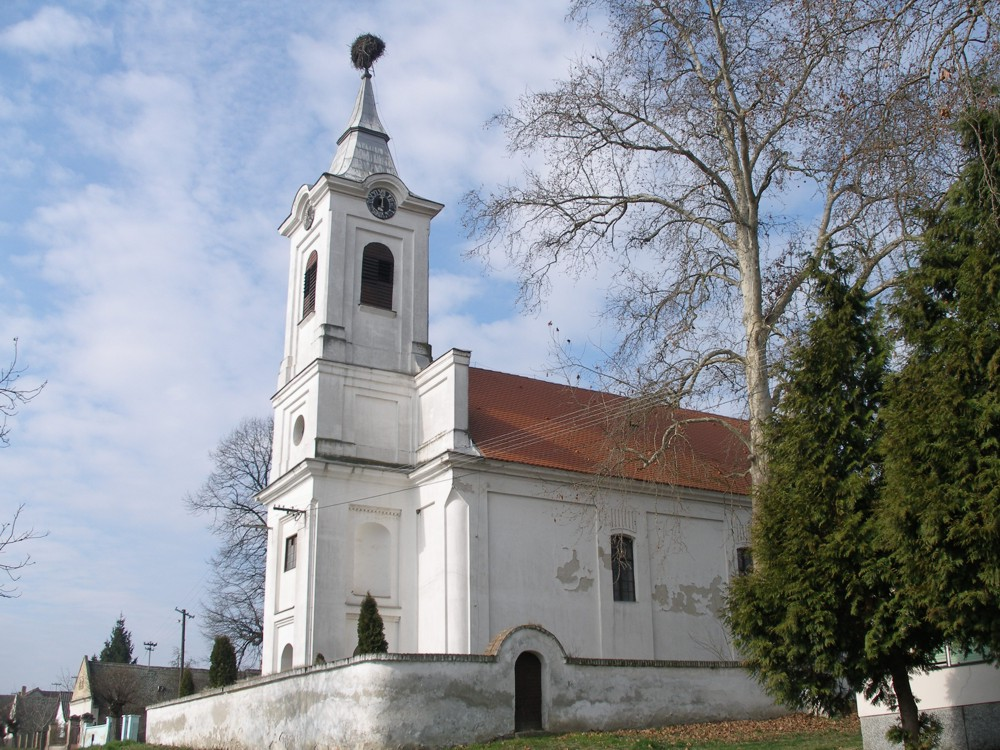
- Reformed Church

- Location of Vardarac in Croatia Vardarac (Croatia) Vardarac (Europe)
- Coordinates: 45.63333333°N 18.76666667°E
- Country: Croatia
- Region: Baranya (Podunavlje)
- County: Osijek-Baranja County
- Municipality: Bilje

Area
  - Total: 48.0 km^{2} (18.5 sq mi)

Population (2021)
  - Total: 504
  - Density: 10.5/km^{2} (27.2/sq mi)
- Time zone: UTC+1 (CET)
  - Summer (DST): UTC+2 (CEST)

Vardarac (Hungarian: Várdaróc) is a settlement in the region of Baranja, Croatia. Administratively, it is located in the Bilje municipality within the Osijek-Baranja County. Population is 630 people.

== See also ==
- Osijek-Baranja County
- Baranja
