= Kamenac =

Kamenac Kő (Hungarian)
- Village (Selo)
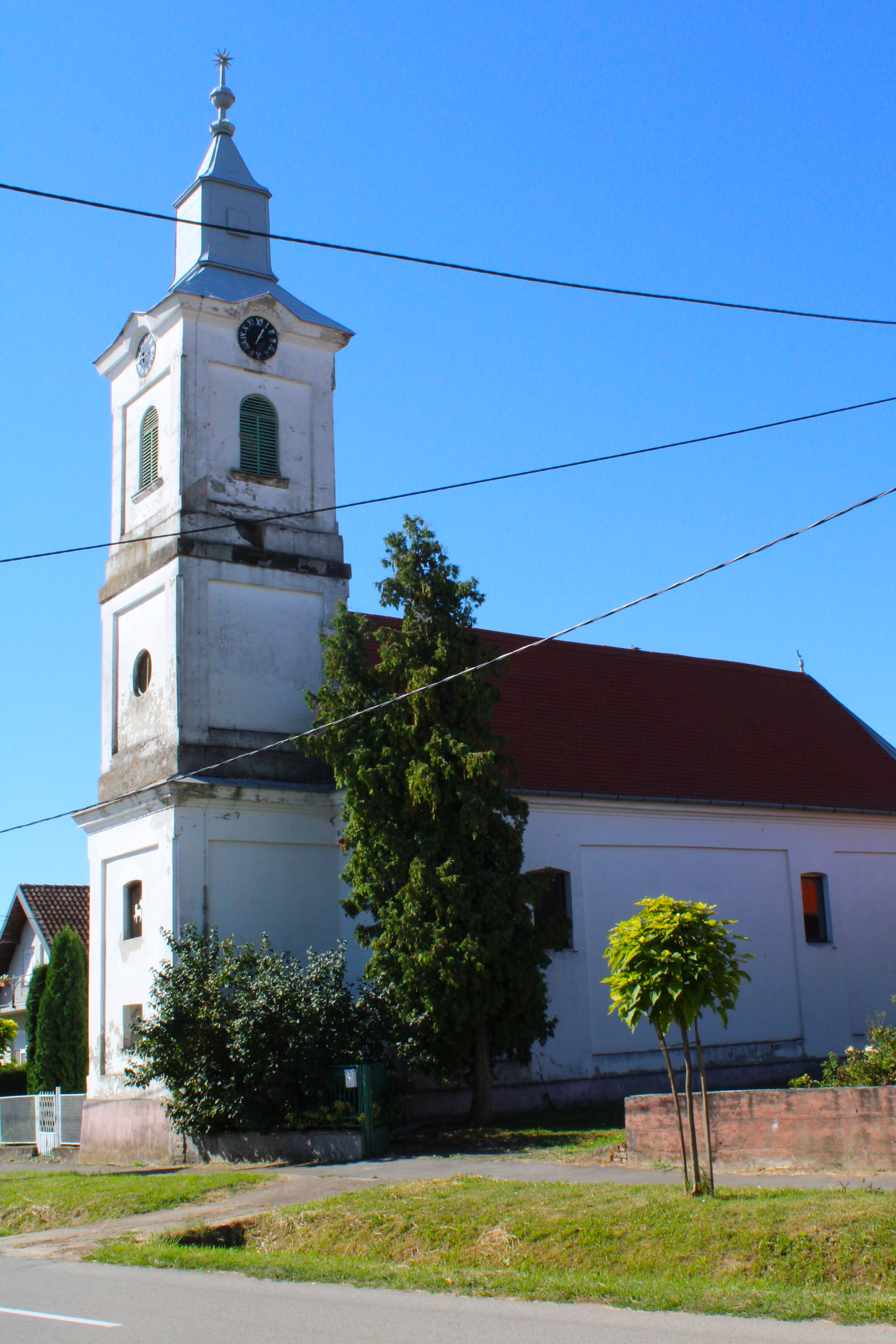
- Reformed Church

- Location of Kamenac in Croatia Kamenac (Croatia) Kamenac (Europe)
- Coordinates: 45.77°N 18.71°E
- Country: Croatia
- Region: Baranya (Podunavlje)
- County: Osijek-Baranja
- Municipality: Kneževi Vinogradi

Area
  - Total: 5.9 km^{2} (2.3 sq mi)

Population (2021)
  - Total: 129
  - Density: 22/km^{2} (57/sq mi)
- Time zone: UTC+1 (CET)
  - Summer (DST): UTC+2 (CEST)

Kamenac (Hungarian: Kő; Serbian Cyrillic: Kaмeнaц) is a settlement in the region of Baranja, Croatia. Administratively, it is located in the Kneževi Vinogradi municipality within the Osijek-Baranja County. Population is 177 people.

== Ethnic groups (2001 census) ==
- Croats = 98
- Hungarians = 74
- Serbs = 5

== See also ==
- Osijek-Baranja county
- Baranja
