= Democratic Union of Hungarians of Croatia =

Democratic Union of Hungarians of Croatia Demokratska zajednica Mađara Hrvatske Horvátországi Magyarok Demokratikus Közössége
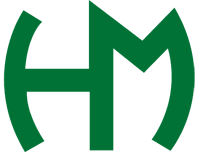
- Abbreviation: HM
- President: Robert Jankovics
- Founded: 1993
- Split from: Association of Hungarians in Croatia (HMSZ)
- Headquarters: Osijek
- Ideology: Hungarian minority interests; Conservatism; Pro-Europeanism
- Political position: Right-wing
- European affiliation: FUEN
- Colours: Green; Orange
- Sabor: 1 / 151

Website
- hmdk.hr

The Democratic Union of Hungarians of Croatia (Croatian: Demokratska zajednica Mađara Hrvatske, DZMH; Hungarian: Horvátországi Magyarok Demokratikus Közössége, HMDK) is a Croatian non-governmental organization that represents the Hungarian minority. It was established in 1993, and is headquartered in Osijek. It is close to Fidesz and the late Croatian president Franjo Tuđman.

== Self-definition ==
The goals of the Democratic Union of Hungarians of Croatia are the demographic preservation of current numbers of Hungarians in Croatia, respect of Constitutional Act on the Rights of National Minorities in the Republic of Croatia and establishment of positive Croatia–Hungary relations. The party was part of ruling coalition in the municipality of Bilje together with the Croatian Democratic Union but it cancelled cooperation with that party in 2011. In 2011 party functionaries stated that they believe they can get into power in Kneževi Vinogradi to, where at the time the main concurrent Union of Hungarian Organisations was in power. They criticized the Union of Hungarian Organisations minority advocacy credentials in the field of protection of Minority languages of Croatia after they failed to introduce Hungarian language into official use into Kneževi Vinogradi at that time.

== Electoral results ==
In the 2003 Croatian parliamentary election, they nominated one Jene Adam in the election for the special seat for the Hungarian minority and won one seat in the parliament.

In the elections of 2007, 2011 and 2015 they nominated Robert Jankovics but did not win the seat.

At 2016 Croatian parliamentary election they again succeeded to win one seat in national minorities electoral District XII, represented by Robert Jankovics. He won another mandate at the 2020 Croatian parliamentary election, as the only candidate for the Hungarian minority. He won another mandate at the 2024 Croatian parliamentary election.

== See also ==
- Alliance of Vojvodina Hungarians
