= Church of St. Stefan Štiljanović, Karanac =

Serbian Orthodox church in Karanac, Croatia

Church of St. Stefan Štiljanović
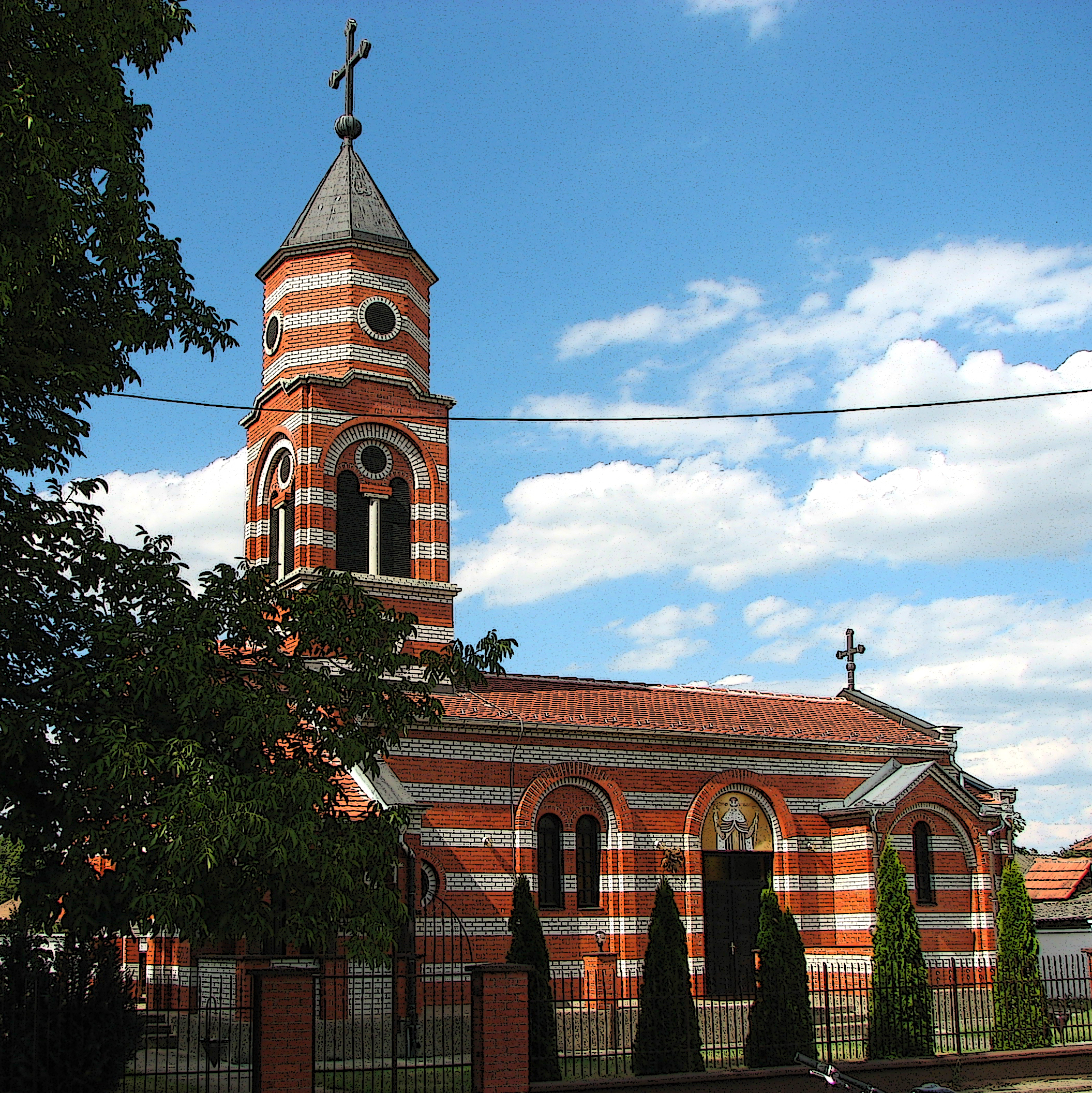
- Location: Karanac
- Country: Croatia
- Denomination: Serbian Orthodox

History
- Dedication: Stefan Štiljanović

Architecture
- Completed: 2002

Administration
- Archdiocese: Eparchy of Osijek Plain and Baranya

Church of St. Stefan Štiljanović (Serbian: Crkva svetog Stefana Štiljanovića, Serbian Cyrillic: Црква светог Стефана Штиљановића) in Karanac is Serbian Orthodox church in eastern Croatia. The church is dedicated to St. Stefan Štiljanović.

== See also ==
- List of Serbian Orthodox churches in Croatia
- Eparchy of Osijek Plain and Baranya
- Serbs of Croatia
