= Karanac =

Karanac Karancs (Hungarian) Kapaнaц (Serbian)
- Village (Selo)
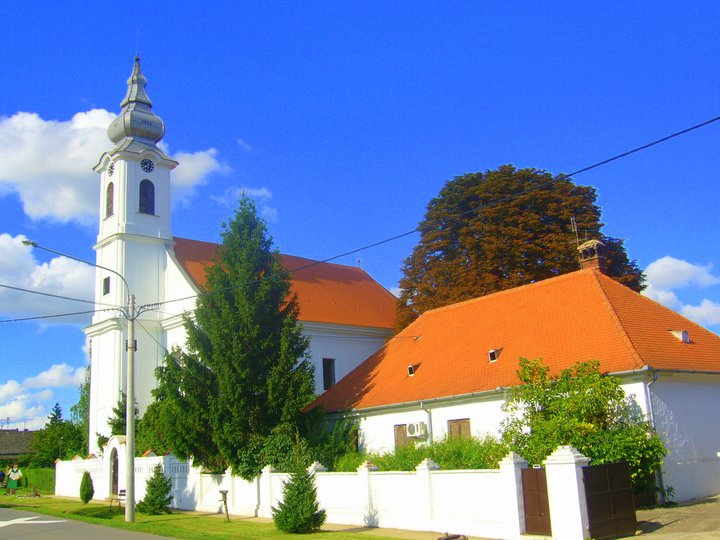
- Reformed Church

- Location of Karanac in Croatia Karanac (Croatia) Karanac (Europe)
- Coordinates: 45.761°N 18.684°E
- Country: Croatia
- Region: Baranya (Podunavlje)
- County: Osijek-Baranja
- Municipality: Kneževi Vinogradi

Area
  - Total: 24.2 km^{2} (9.3 sq mi)

Population (2021)
  - Total: 658
  - Density: 27.2/km^{2} (70.4/sq mi)
- Time zone: UTC+1 (CET)
  - Summer (DST): UTC+2 (CEST)

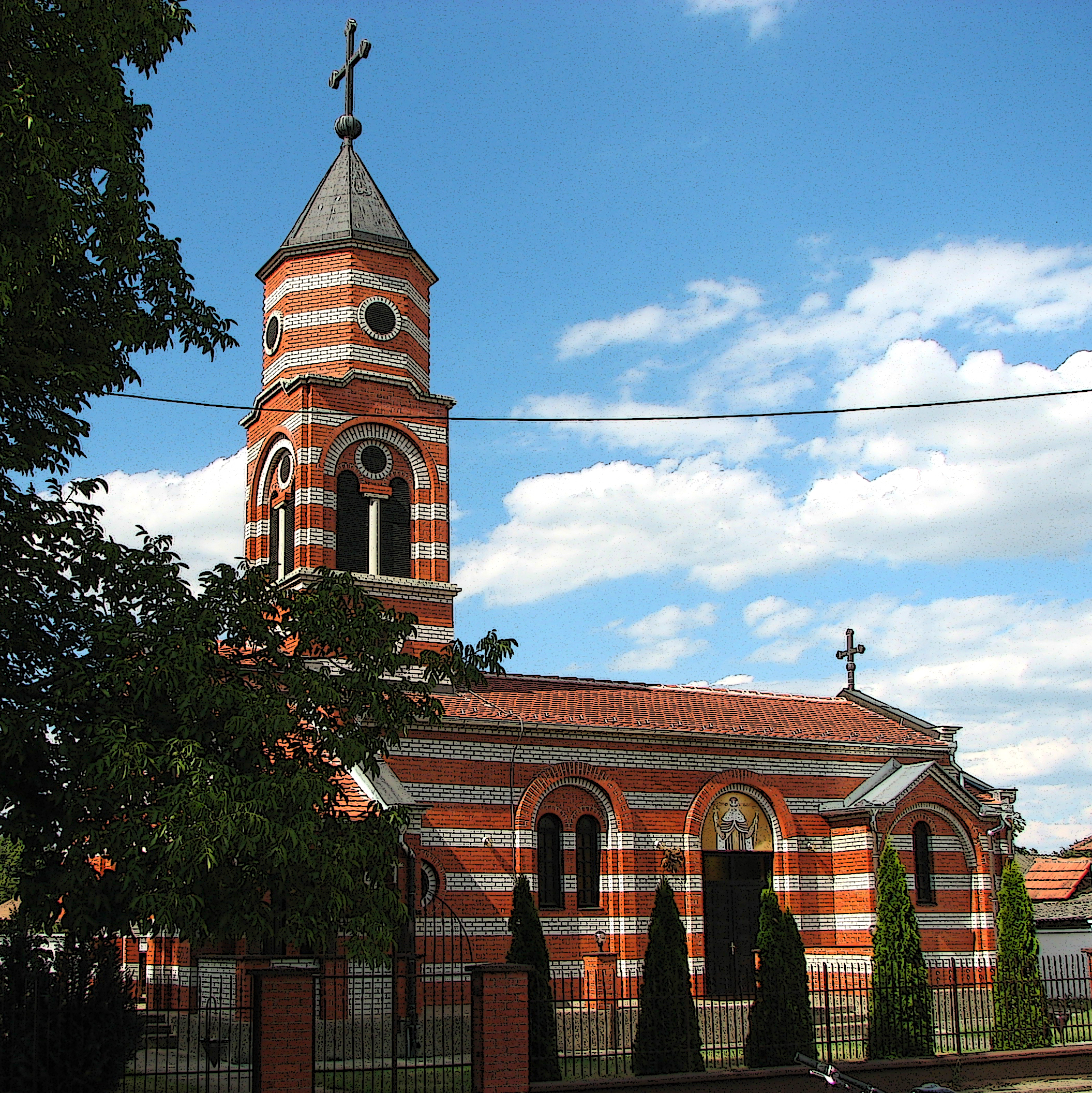
Church of St. Stefan Štiljanović, Karanac

Karanac (Hungarian: Karancs; Serbian Cyrillic: Kapaнaц) is a settlement in the region of Baranja, Croatia. Administratively, it is located in the Kneževi Vinogradi municipality within the Osijek-Baranja County. Population is 1,065 people. Today, the village mainly lives on tourism. The place once belonged to the manor of Darda.

== Ethnic groups (2001 census) ==
- Croats = 429
- Serbs = 341
- Hungarians = 219
- others = 76

== See also ==
- Church of St. Stefan Štiljanović, Karanac
- Reformed Church, Karanac
