= Suza, Osijek-Baranja County =

Suza Csúza (Hungarian)
- Village (Selo)
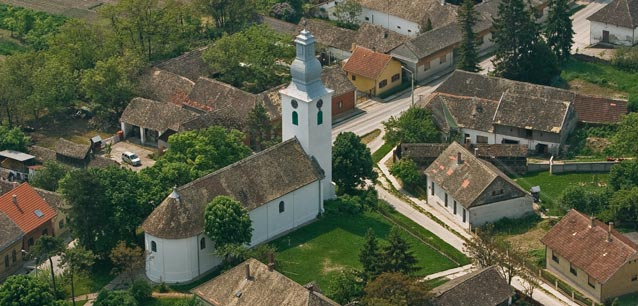
- The Reformed Church of Suza from a bird's eye-view

- Location within Osijek-Baranja County Location within Croatia Location within Europe
- Coordinates: 45°46′59″N 18°46′30″E
- Country: Croatia
- Region: Baranya (Podunavlje)
- County: Osijek-Baranja
- Municipality: Kneževi Vinogradi

Area
  - Total: 9.4 km^{2} (3.6 sq mi)

Population (2021)
  - Total: 423
  - Density: 45/km^{2} (120/sq mi)

Suza (Hungarian: Csúza; Serbian Cyrillic: Cуза) is a settlement in the region of Baranja, Croatia. Administratively, it is located in the Kneževi Vinogradi municipality within the Osijek-Baranja County. Population is 636 people.

Suza is mentioned for the first time in the gift document of King Bela IV from 1252 as Chuza. From 1698 to 1734, the village was owned by Eugene of Savoy. Today, Suza is an agricultural village, where wheat, barley, corn, sunflower, vines and fruit are grown.

== Ethnic groups (2001 census) ==
- 543 – Hungarians
- 35 – Croats
- 20 – Serbs
- 38 – others

== See also ==
- Reformed Church, Suza
