= Hungarians in Croatia =

Ethnic group

Hungarians of Croatia Mađari u Hrvatskoj Magyarok Horvátországban
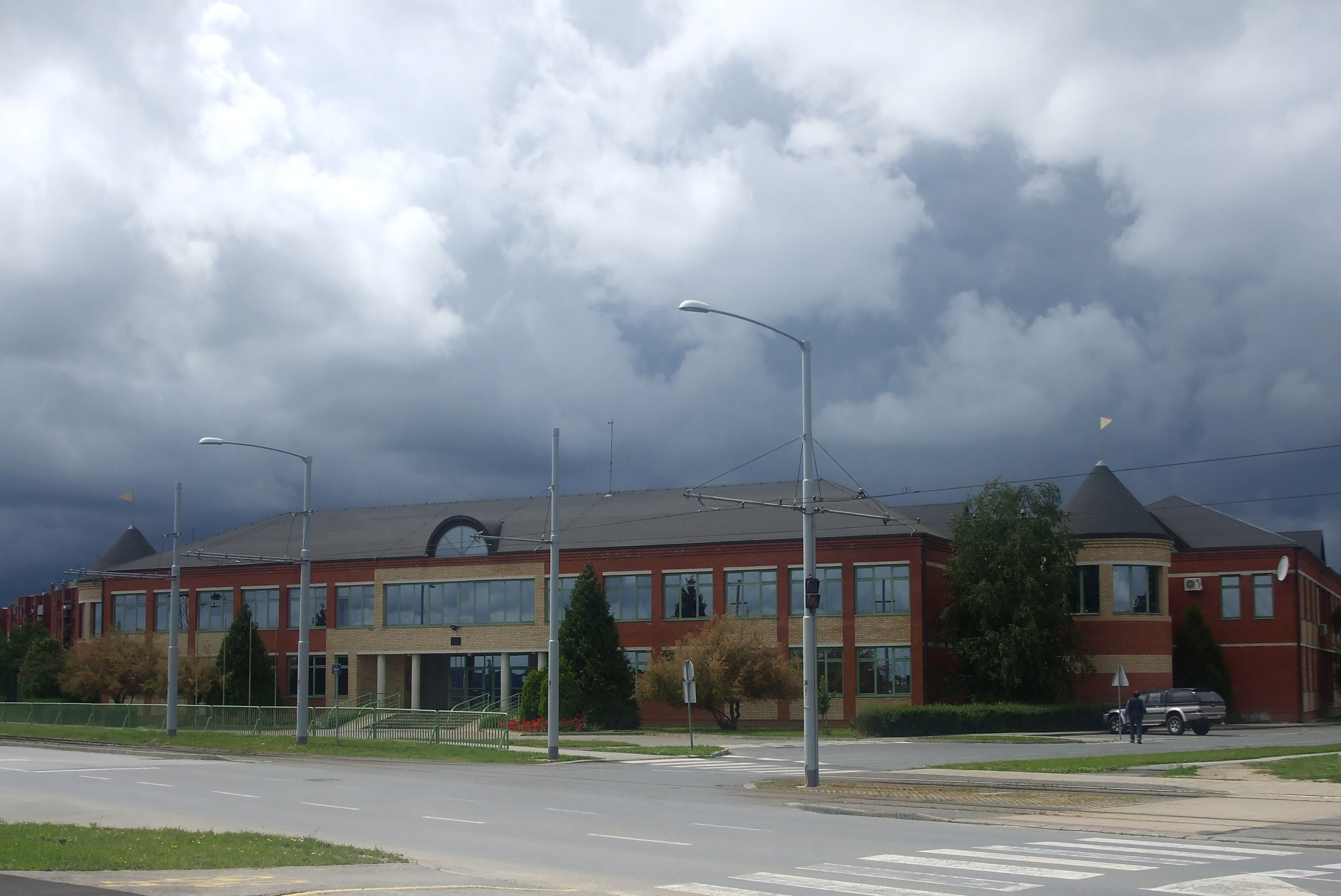
- Hungarian Cultural and Educational Center in Osijek

Total population
- 10,315

Regions with significant populations

Languages
- Croatian, Hungarian

Religion
- Catholicism, Protestantism, Eastern Orthodoxy

Related ethnic groups
- Hungarians, Hungarians in Vojvodina, Szekelys of Bukovina

Hungarians are a recognized ethnic minority in Croatia. According to the 2021 census there were 10,315 Hungarians living in Croatia. According to the 2011 census there were 14,048 people of Hungarian ethnicity living in Croatia (or 0.33% of total population). Around two thirds of them (8,249) live in Osijek-Baranja County in eastern Croatia, especially in the Croatian part of the Baranya region which borders Hungary to the north. There are also small Hungarian communities in other parts of the country, including areas in Bjelovar-Bilogora County in central Croatia where 881 people identify themselves as Hungarian.

== History ==
Coat of arms of the Kingdom of Hungary and Croatia (1915)

Hungary and Croatia have a long history dating back to the dynastic crises that followed the death of king Dmitar Zvonimir in 1089. His widow Helen II supported her brother Ladislaus I of Hungary in his claim for the kingdom of Croatia amidst the political turmoil. Two years later, Ladislaus managed to seize power and proclaim his sovereignty over the Croatian kingdom, however, he and his armies were still unable to gain full control by the time of his death in 1095. It was his nephew Coloman I who finally defeated the last native Croatian king Peter II of Croatia at the Battle of Gvozd Mountain, and was then crowned as King of Croatia in capital city of Biograd on the Adriatic Sea in 1102.

After the Hungarian victory, Croatia and Hungary entered into a personal union in which certain terms were agreed on. The most significant were that two would remain under Hungarian rule while some separate Croatian institutions were maintained such as the Sabor (Croatian parliament), the ban (viceroy), and retention of Croatian lands and titles. The union lasted until 1918; in that time, many Hungarian military personnel settled in Croatia during the Ottoman invasion, and the borderlands of Hungary and Croatia proper blurred with the ethnic mix.

== Population ==
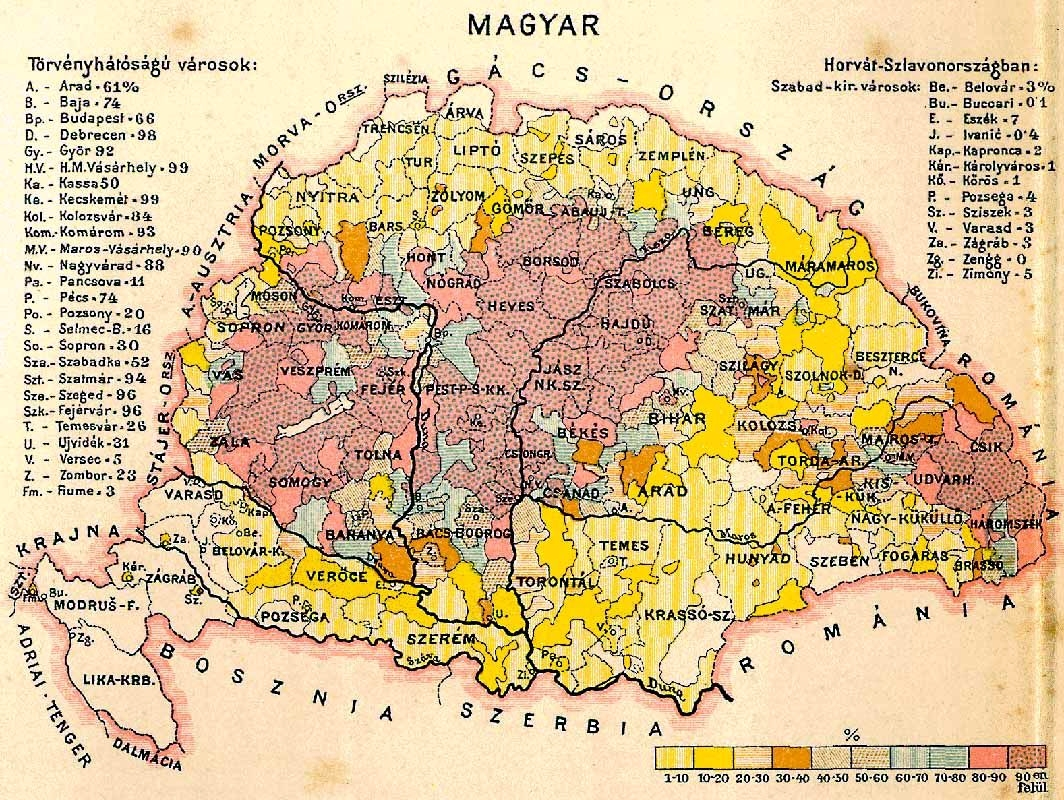
1890 census of Magyars in the kingdom

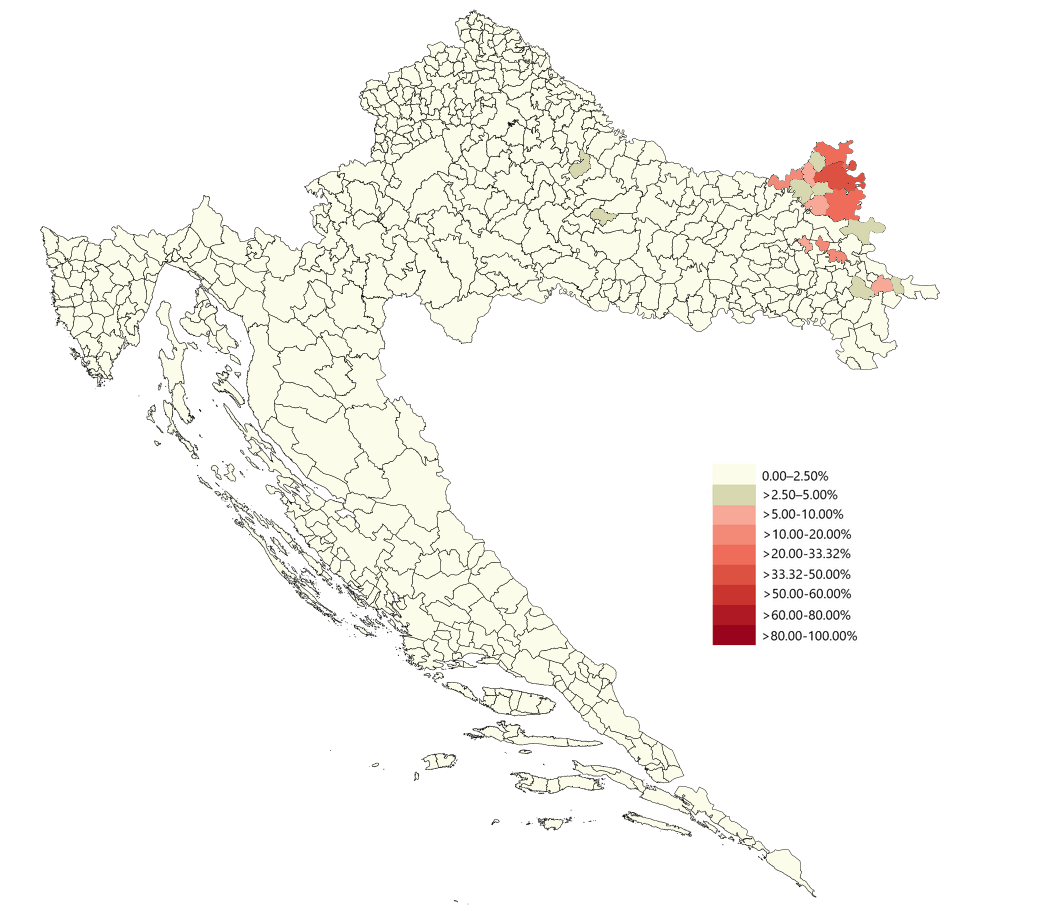
Hungarians in Croatia (2021 census)

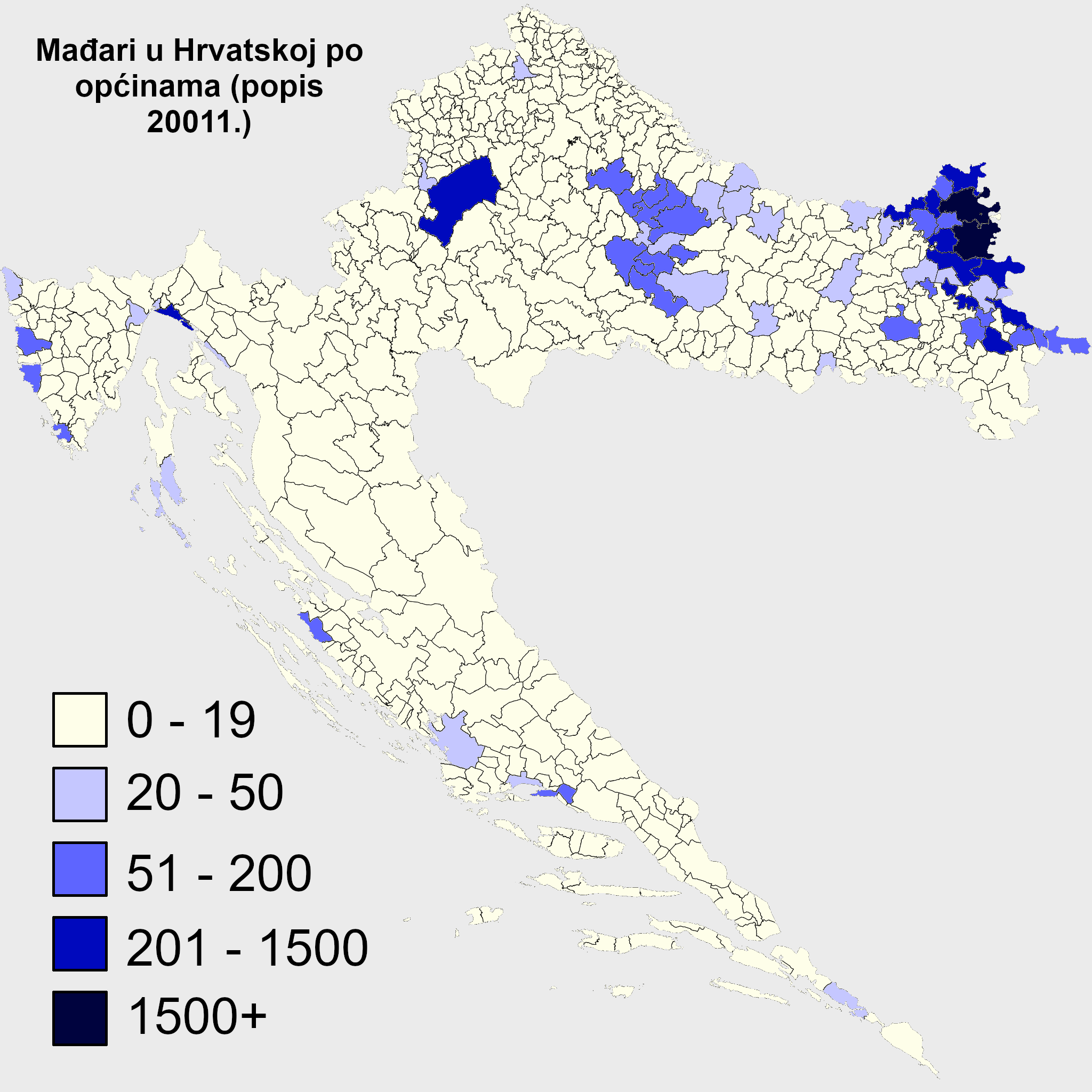
Hungarians in Croatia by Municipality

According to the 2022 Census, Municipalities with significant Hungarian minority (10 percent or more) include:

- Kneževi Vinogradi (1,299 or 38.70%)
- Bilje (1,238 or 25.94%)
- Draž (432 or 22.17%)
- Tordinci (309 or 18.65%)
- Ernestinovo (304 or 15.61%)
- Petlovac (244 or 13.02%)

The largest town with a significant Hungarian population is Beli Manastir, with 637 Hungarians (7.99%).

In addition, 10,231 people identified Hungarian language as their mother tongue.

As of 2009, Hungarian is officially used in two municipalities and four other settlements in Croatia, according to the European Charter for Regional or Minority Languages.

== Language ==
=== Municipalities with Hungarian language in official use ===
| Municipality | Name in minority language | Language | Affected settlements | Introduced based on | Population (2021) | Percentage of Hungarians (2021) | County |
|---|---|---|---|---|---|---|---|
| Kneževi Vinogradi | Hercegszöllős | Hungarian | Kneževi Vinogradi, Karanac, Zmajevac, Suza, Kamenac, Kotlina | Constitutional Act | 3,357 | 38.70% | Osijek-Baranja |
| Bilje | Belley | Hungarian | All settlements | Municipality Statute | 4,772 | 25.94% | Osijek-Baranja |
| Ernestinovo | Ernestinovo | Hungarian | Laslovo | Municipality Statute | 1,948 | 15.61% | Osijek-Baranja |
| Petlovac | Baranyaszentistván | Hungarian | Novi Bezdan | Municipality Statute | 1,874 | 13.02% | Osijek-Baranja |
| Tompojevci | Tompojevce | Hungarian | Čakovci | Municipality Statute | 1,116 | 9.0% | Vukovar-Syrmia |
| Tordinci | Valkótard | Hungarian | Korođ | Municipality Statute | 1,657 | 18.65% | Vukovar-Syrmia |

== Politics ==
The two main Hungarian associations in Croatia are the Democratic Union of Hungarians of Croatia (Hungarian: Horvátországi Magyarok Demokratikus Közössége or HMDK) and the Union of Hungarian Associations (Hungarian: Magyar Egyesületek Szövetsége or MESZ).

Hungarians are officially recognized as an autochthonous national minority, and as such, they elect a special representative to the Croatian Parliament.

Every elected special representative since 1992 Parliamentary elections.

| No. | Representative | Party | Elections won | Term |
|---|---|---|---|---|
| 1 | Ferenc Farago | Ind. | 1992 | 1992 − 1995 |
| 2 | Sandor Jakab | Ind. | 1995 | 1995 − 2000 |
| 3 | Tibor Santo | DZMH | 2000 | 2000 − 2003 |
| 4 | Jene Adam | DZMH | 2003 | 2003 − 2007 |
| 5 | Deneš Šoja | SMU | 2007; 2011 | 2007 − 2015 |
| 6 | Šandor Juhas | SMU | 2015 | 2015 − 2016 |
| 7 | Róbert Jankovics | DZMH | 2016; 2020 | 2016 − |

== Culture ==
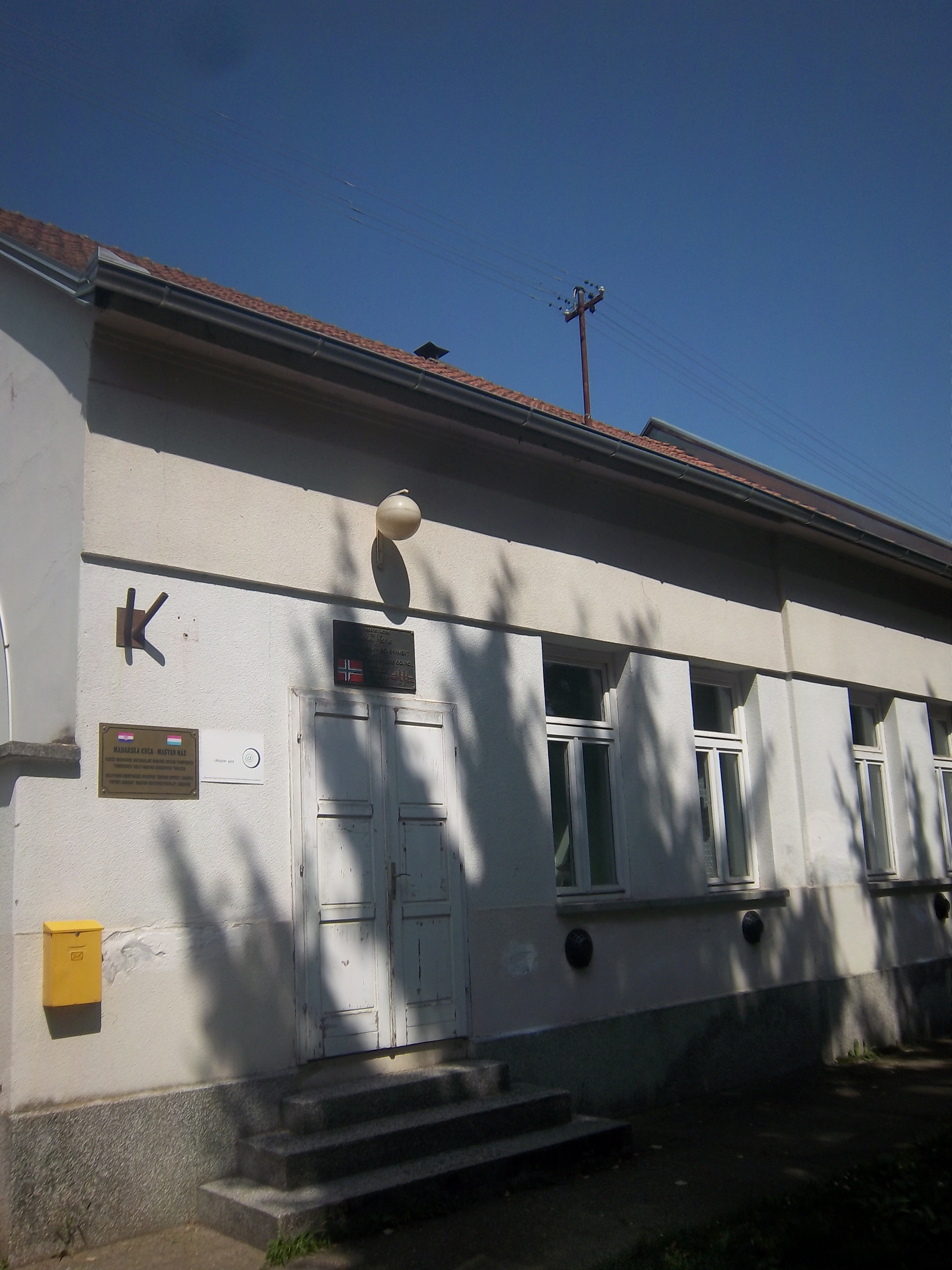
Hungarian House in Čakovci in Vukovar-Syrmia County.

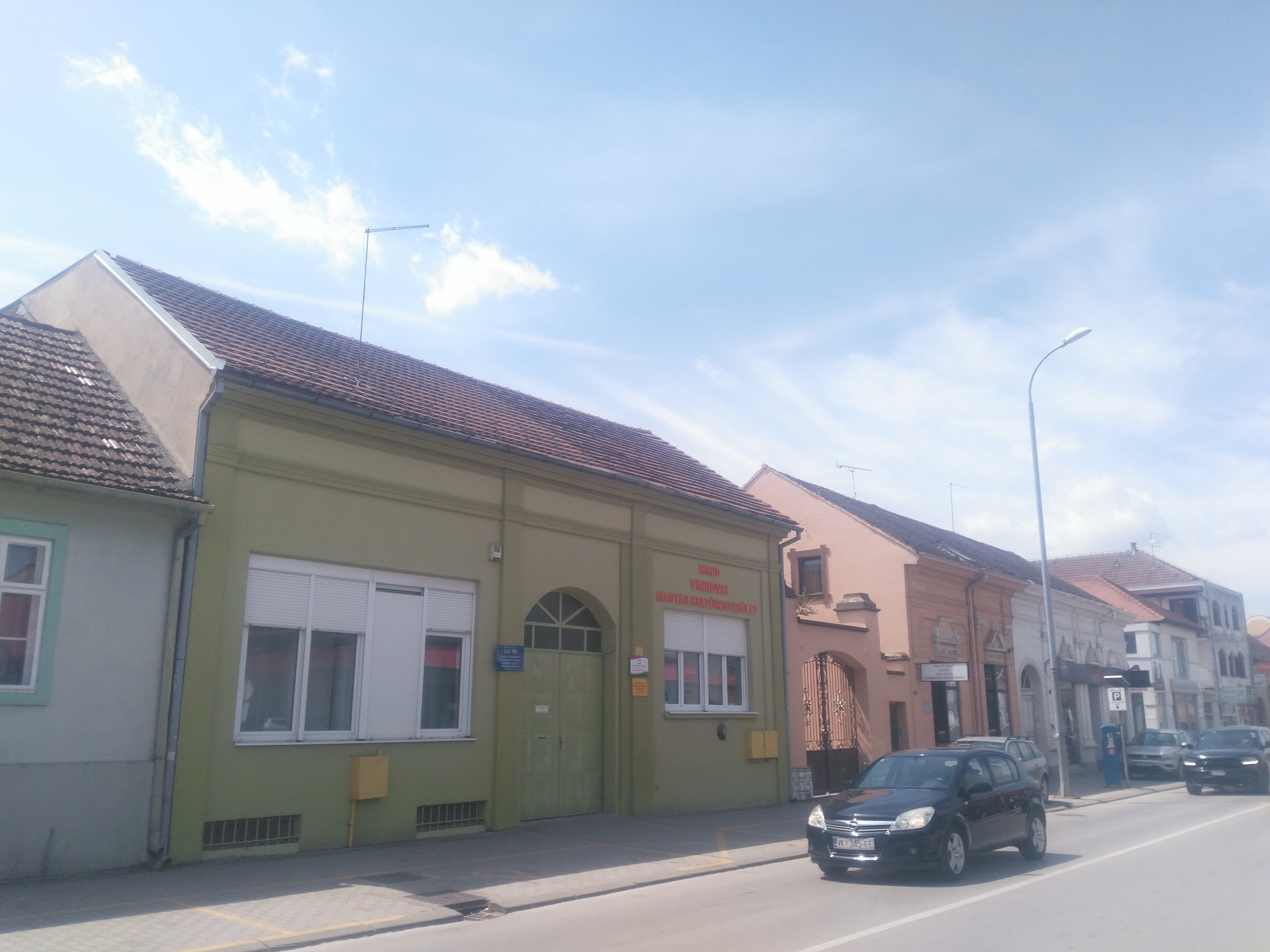
Hungarian Cultural Association Vinkovci

Since 1999, the Hungarian Cultural Society Népkör have organized the "Hungarian Days" festival in Osijek. In 2000 various Hungarian cultural groups have organised Hungarian music and singing festivals.

The Educational and Cultural Center of Hungarians in Croatia is located in Osijek. In Beli Manastir, the town's public library hosts the Central Library of Hungarians in Croatia.

== See also ==
- Democratic Union of Hungarians of Croatia
- Croatia–Hungary relations
- Hungarian diaspora
- Ethnic groups in Croatia
- Croats of Hungary
