= Kneževi Vinogradi =

Kneževi Vinogradi Herczegszöllős (Hungarian) Кнежеви Виногради (Serbian)
- Municipality
- Municipality of Kneževi Vinogradi; Općina Kneževi Vinogradi
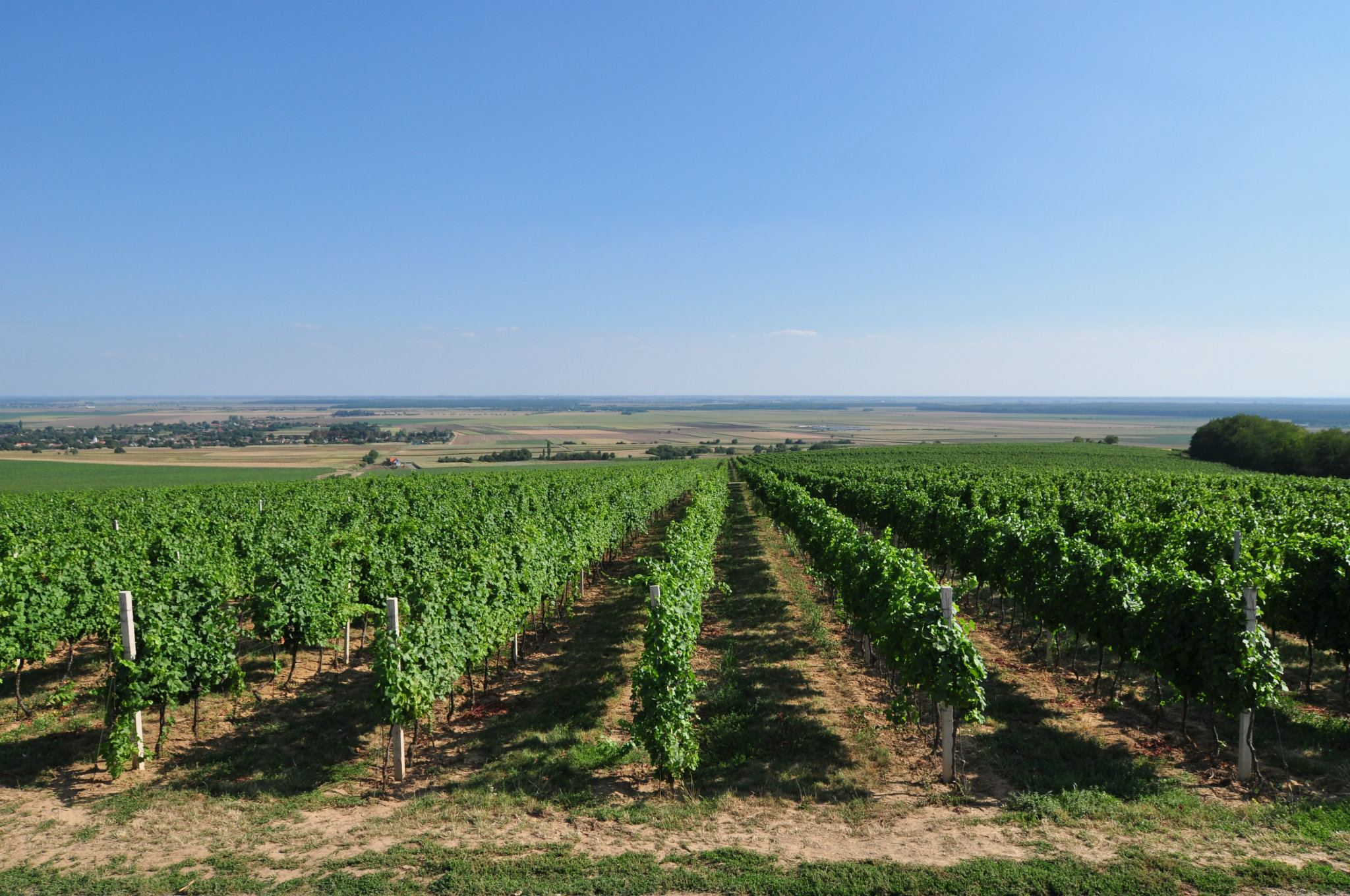
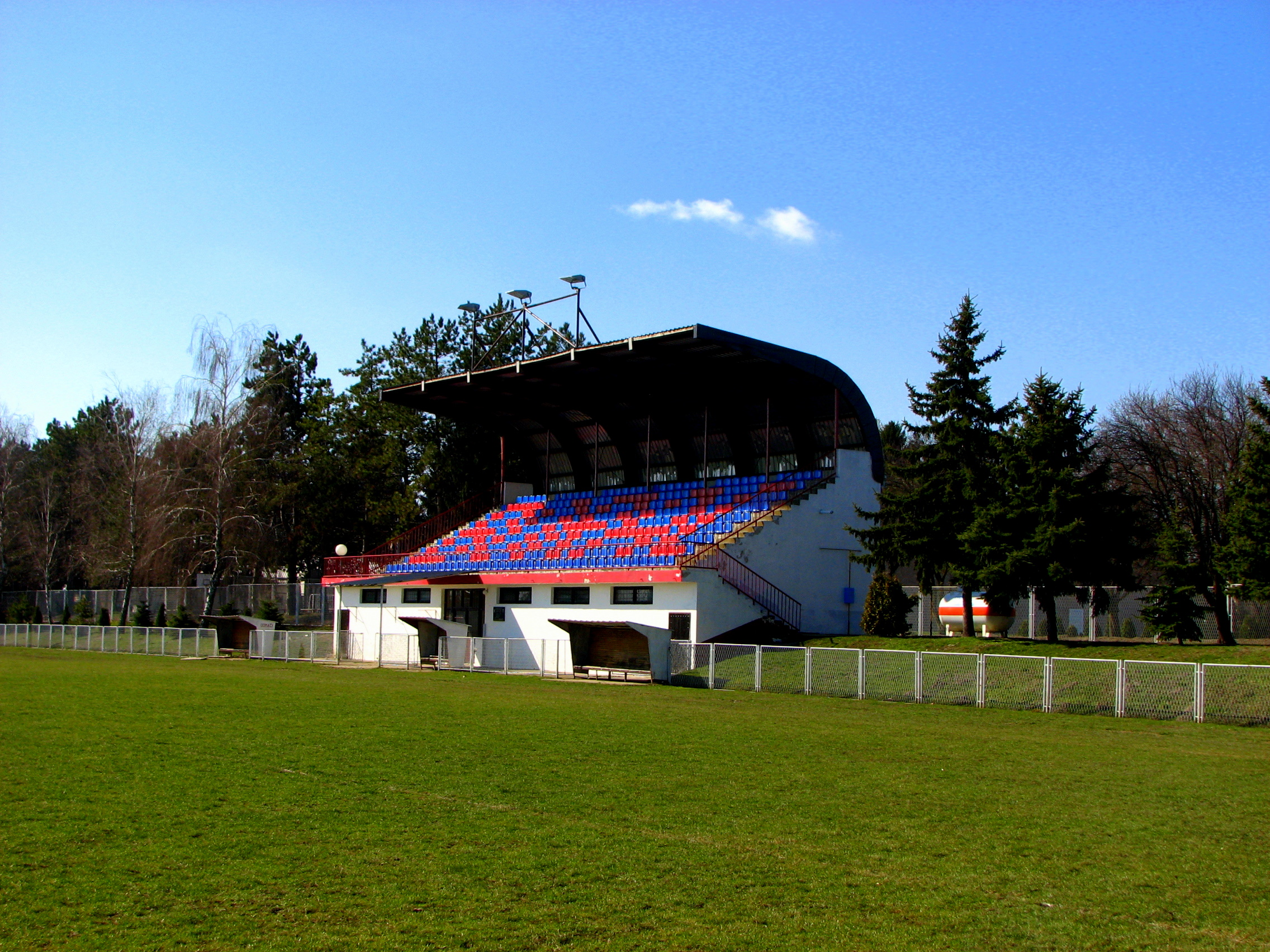
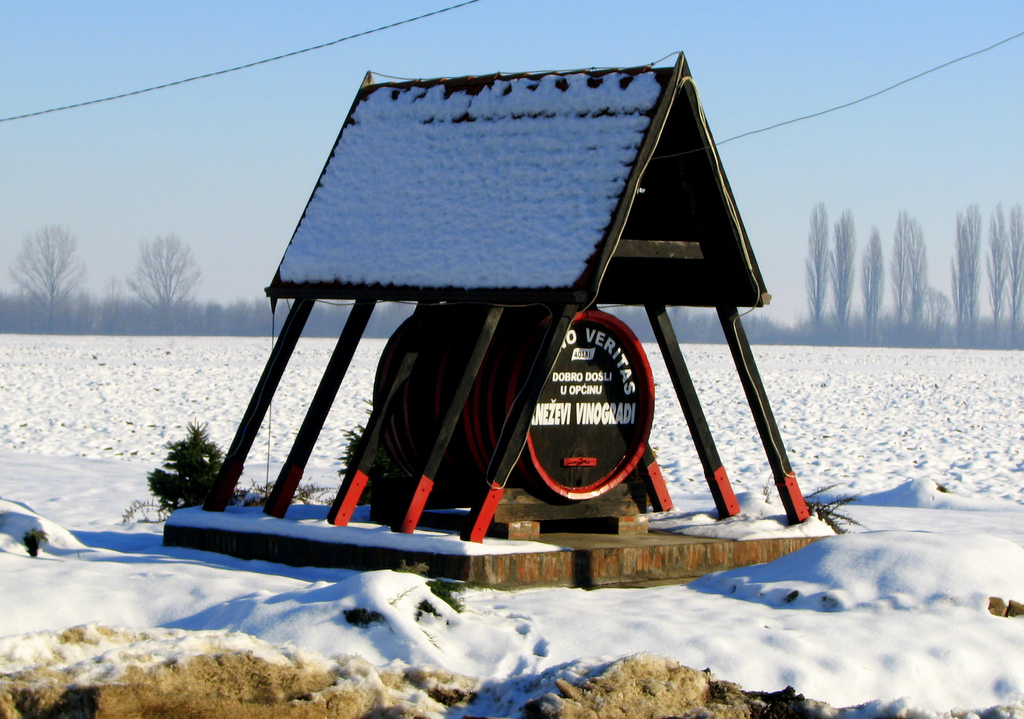
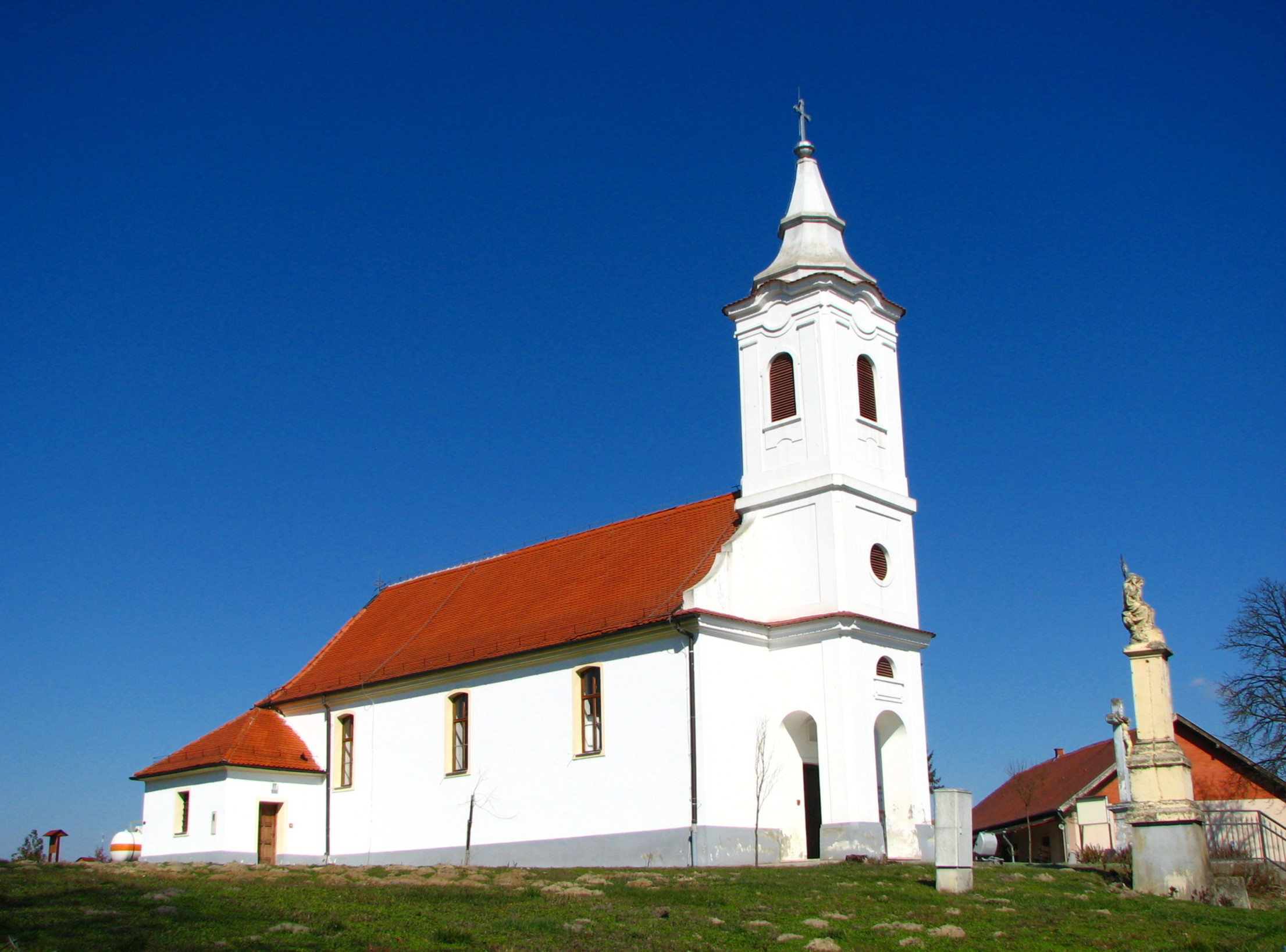
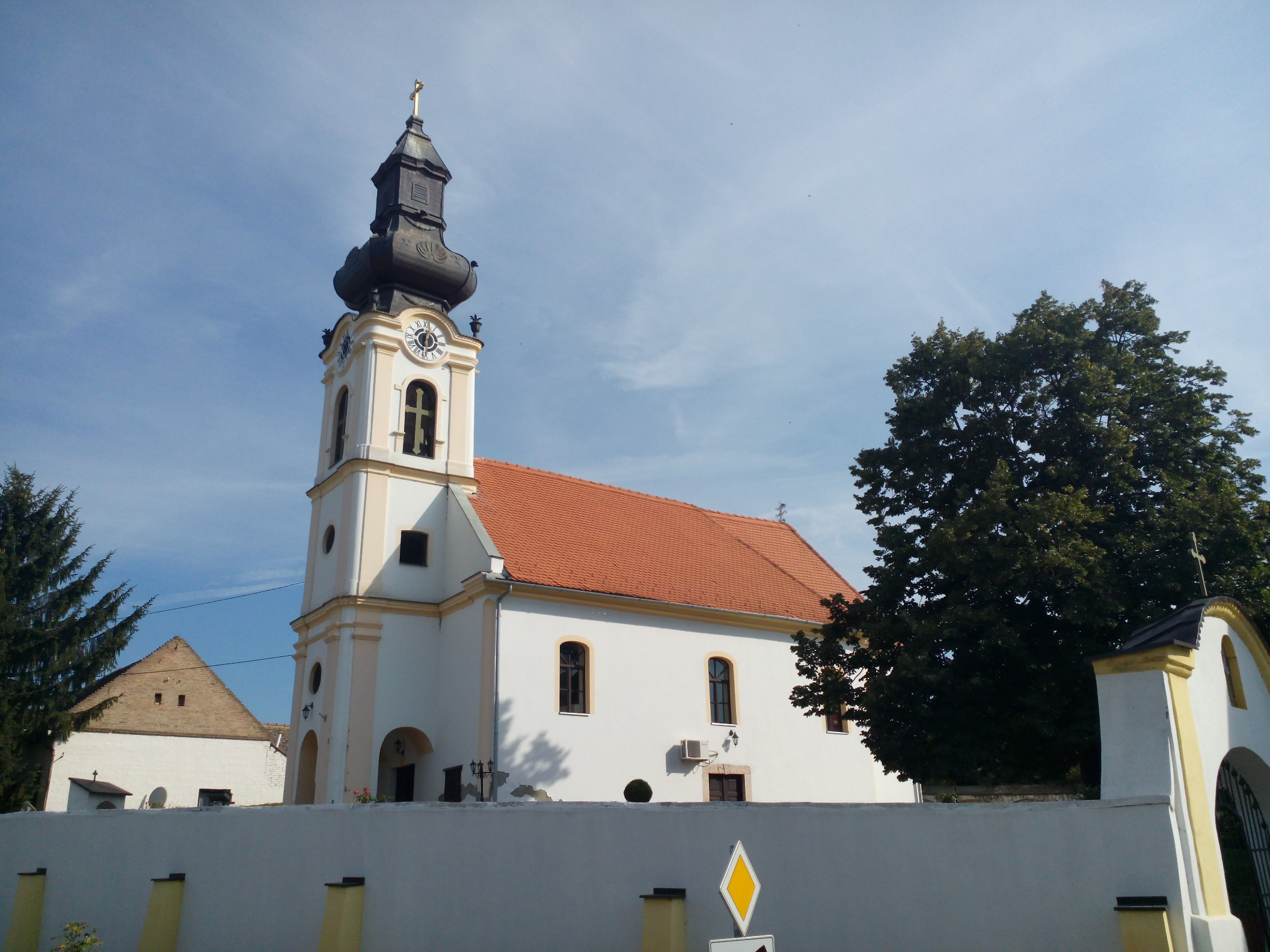
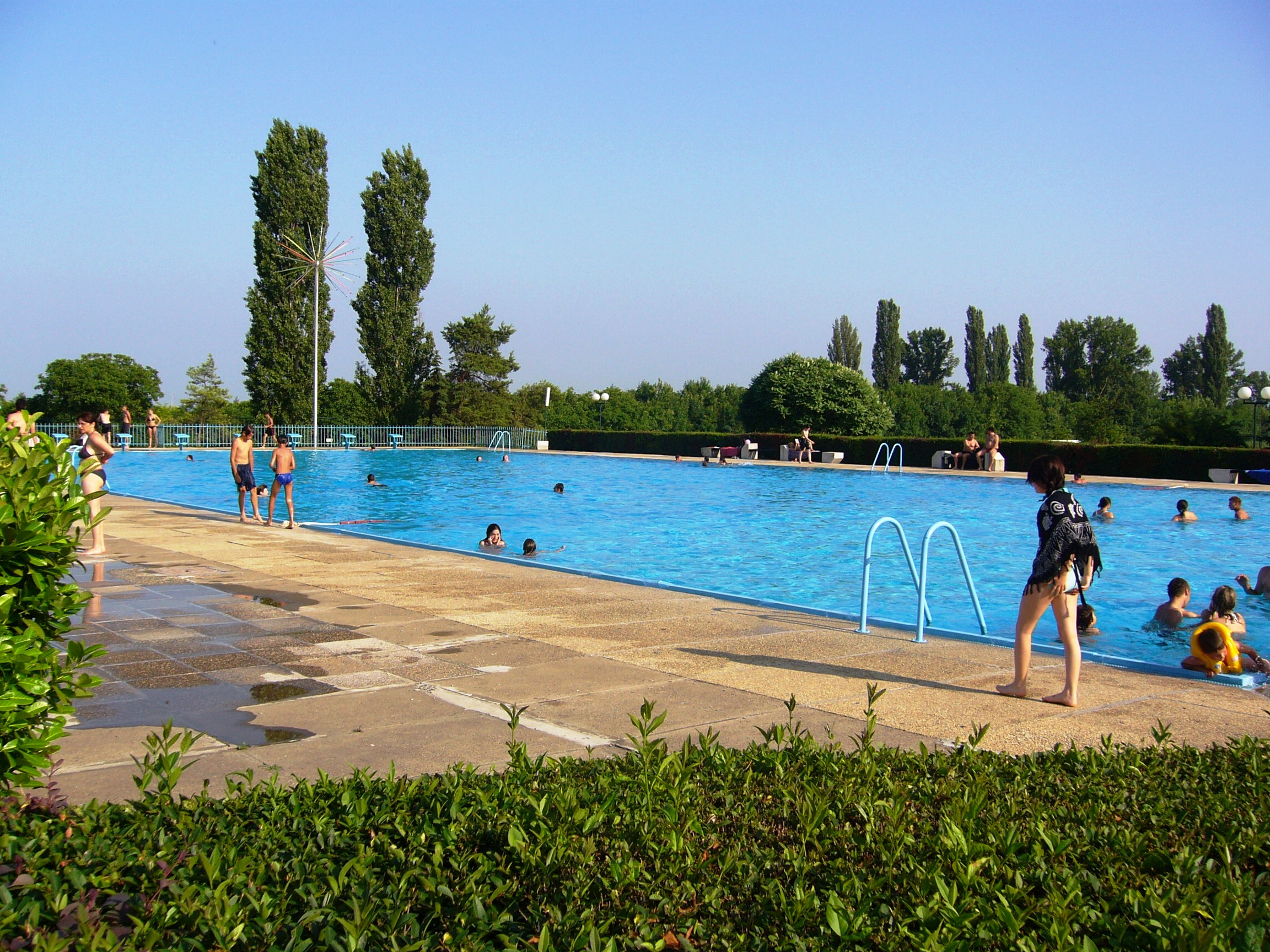
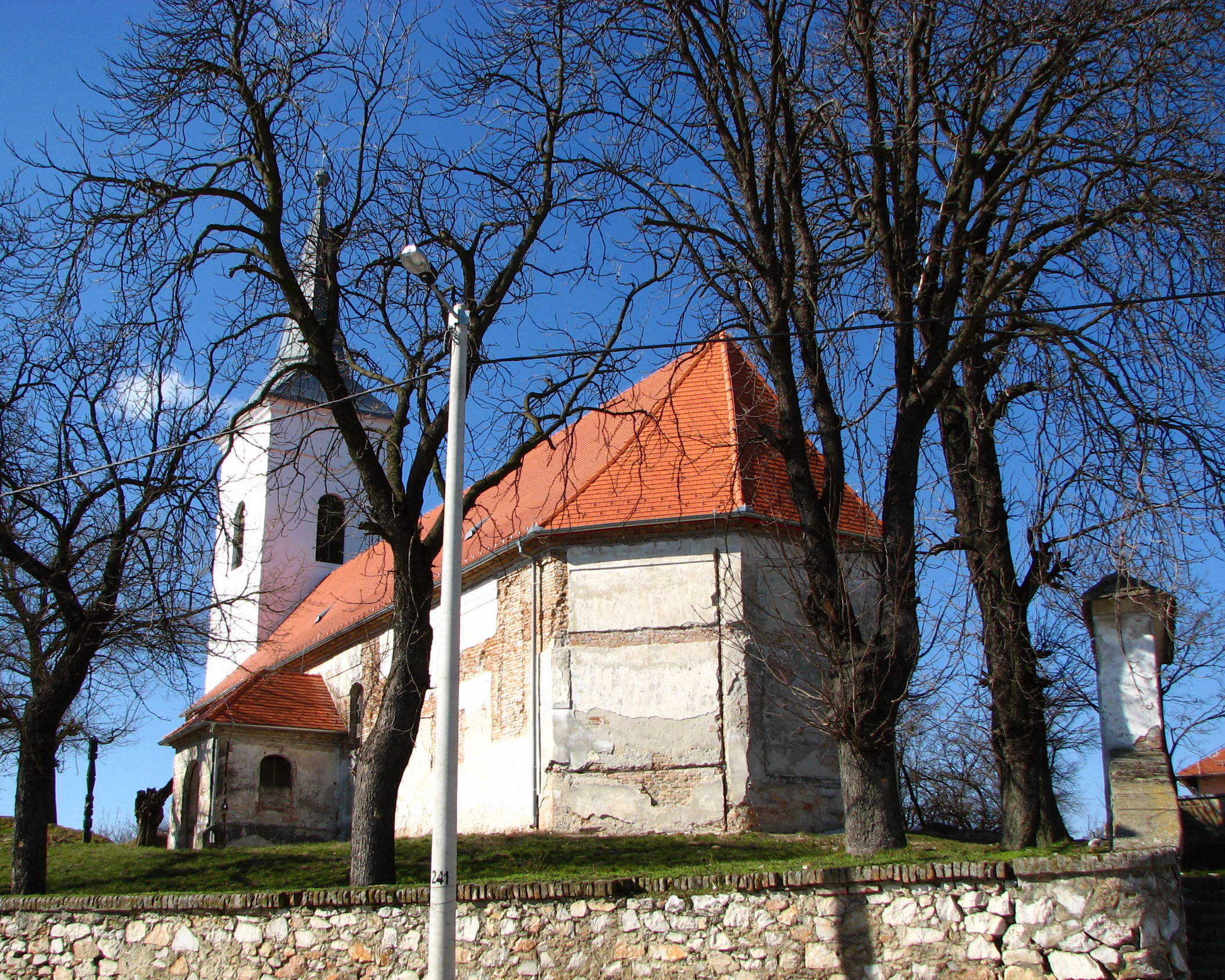

- Coat of arms

- Location of Kneževi Vinogradi in Croatia Kneževi Vinogradi (Croatia) Kneževi Vinogradi (Europe)
- Coordinates: 45°45′1″N 18°43′59″E
- Country: Croatia
- Region: Baranja (Podunavlje)
- County: Osijek-Baranja County

Government
  - Municipal mayor: Vedran Kramarić

Area
  - Municipality: 249.6 km^{2} (96.4 sq mi)
  - Urban: 144.2 km^{2} (55.7 sq mi)

Population (2021)
  - Municipality: 3,357
  - Density: 13.45/km^{2} (34.83/sq mi)
  - Urban: 1,332
  - Urban density: 9.237/km^{2} (23.92/sq mi)
- Time zone: UTC+1 (CET)
  - Summer (DST): UTC+2 (CEST)
- Postal codes: 31309 Kneževi Vinogradi
- Area code: 031
- Website: knezevi-vinogradi.hr

Kneževi Vinogradi (Hungarian: Hercegszöllős; Serbian Cyrillic: Кнежеви Виногради) is a village and municipality in Croatia. It is situated in the Osijek-Baranja County, on the southern slopes of Bansko Brdo, 11 km southeast of Beli Manastir. It lies at an altitude of 103 m. Chief occupations of villagers include farming, viticulture, livestock breeding and dairy industry. At the time of 2011 census, Kneževi Vinogradi was the only municipality in Croatia with a relative majority of Hungarians of Croatia.

In Roman times, the Donatium colony was located here, so Suljoš, as people call Kneževe Vinograde, is one of the oldest places in Baranja.

== Name ==
The name of the village derived from Croatian words "knez" ("prince" in English) and "vinograd" ("vineyard" in English), hence the meaning of the name is "the prince's vineyards". The name of the village in Serbo-Croatian is plural.

In other languages, the village in German is known as Weingärten or Weingärten i.d.Braunau, in Hungarian as Hercegszöllős (earlier Herczeg-Szöllős) and in Serbian as Kneževi Vinogradi (Кнежеви Виногради).

Hungarian is co-official with Croatian at the municipal level in Kneževi Vinogradi. As of 2023, the legal requirements for the fulfillment of bilingual standards have only been partly carried out. Official buildings do have Hungarian signage, as do street signs and seals, but not traffic signs. Hungarian is used on some official documents but not others, like legal acts. There are public legal and administrative employees proficient in the language. Preserving minority Serbian place names and assigning street names to minority historical figures is legally mandated and carried out for both Hungarians and Serbs.

== Geography ==
The municipality of Kneževi Vinogradi include following settlements:

- Kneževi Vinogradi
- Jasenovac
- Kamenac
- Karanac
- Kotlina
- Mirkovac
- Sokolovac
- Suza
- Zmajevac

== History ==
During the Croatian War of Independence the village became a part of the self proclaimed SAO Eastern Slavonia, Baranja and Western Syrmia. At the time of Operation Medak Pocket local population led by women organized resistance to mobilization of their husbands who were to be sent to Knin, capital of the self-proclaimed Republic of Serbian Krajina. The group shouted paroles such as "we do not give our husbands", "we don't want them to defend Knin", "who will defend Baranja?"... In the afternoon on the day of the protest, local residents erected barricades at the entrance to the village to prevent the mobilization.

== Features ==
Kneževi Vinogradi is underdeveloped municipality which is statistically classified as the First Category Area of Special State Concern by the Government of Croatia.

== Demographics ==
=== Municipality ===
Ethnic groups (2021)
1. Croats 1,334 (39.7%)
2. Hungarians 1,299 (38.7%)
3. Serbs 554 (16.5%)
4. Germans 43 (1.28%)
5. Others 127 (3.78%)

According to the 2021 census, there are 3,357 inhabitants in the municipality, including:

- Croats (39.74%)
- Hungarians (38.70%)
- Serbs (16.50%)
- Germans (1.28%)
- others (including Romani, Albanians, Macedonians, Slovenes, etc.).

== Politics ==
=== Minority councils ===
Directly elected minority councils and representatives are tasked with consulting the local or regional authorities, advocating for minority rights and interests, integration into public life and participation in the management of local affairs. At the 2023 Croatian national minorities councils and representatives elections Hungarians and Serbs of Croatia each fulfilled legal requirements to elect 10 members municipal minority councils of the Kneževi Vinogradi Municipality.

== See also ==
- Osijek-Baranja County
- Baranja
- List of Croatian municipalities with minority languages in official use
- Reformed Church, Kneževi Vinogradi
