= Reformed Christian Church in Serbia =

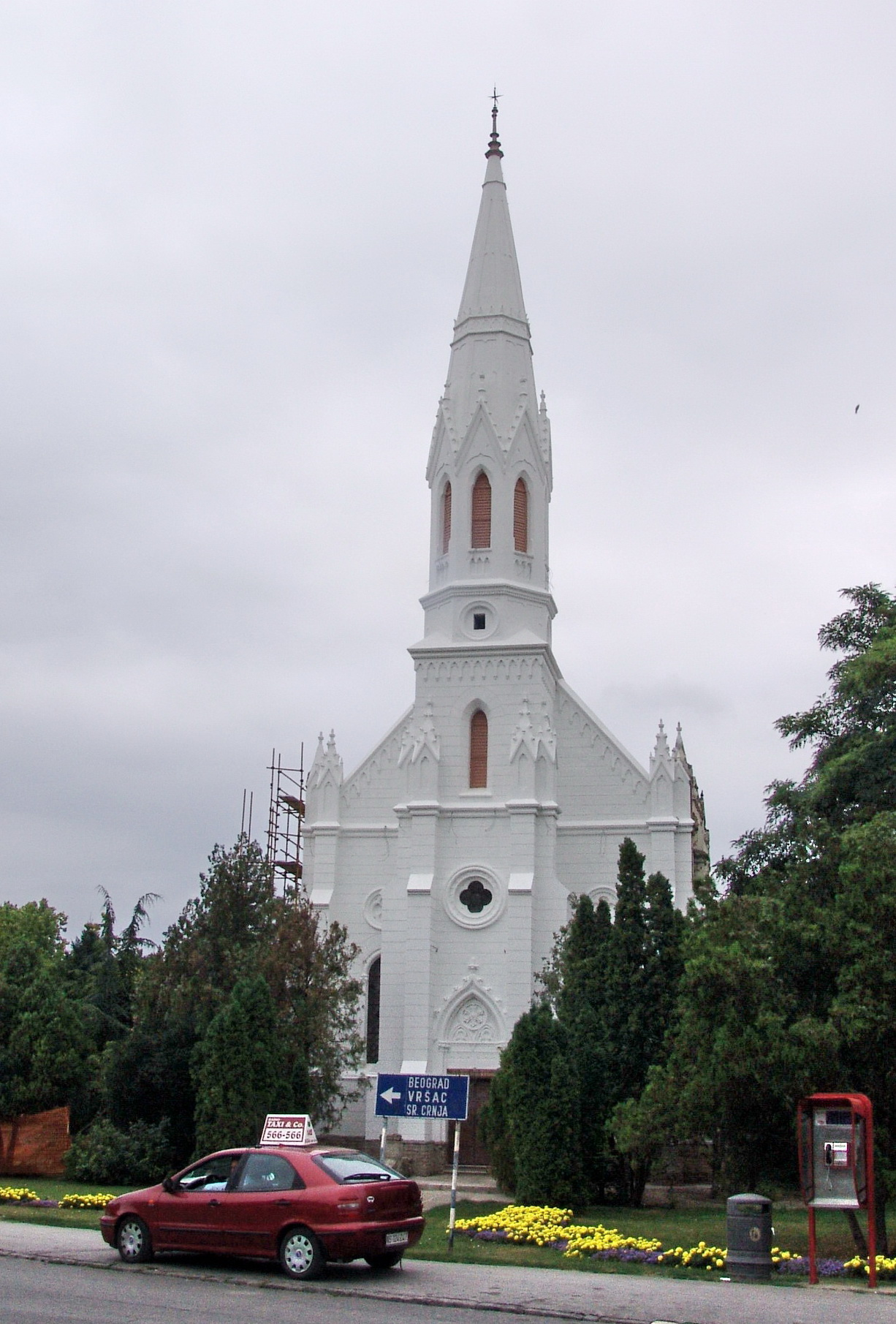
- Reformed Christian church in Zrenjanin
- Classification: Protestant
- Orientation: Calvinism
- Polity: Quasi-Episcopal (modified Presbyterian)
- Bishop: Béla Halász
- Associations: World Communion of Reformed Churches; Hungarian Reformed Communion
- Region: Vojvodina, Serbia
- Separations: Reformed Church in Hungary
- Congregations: 50
- Members: 8,000
- Official website: reformatusok.rs

Reformed Christian Church in Serbia (Hungarian: Szerbiai Református Keresztén Egyház, Serbian: Реформатска хришћанска црква у Србији/ Reformatska hrišćanska crkva u Srbiji) is a Reformed (Calvinist) church in Serbia. It has 8,000 members, the vast majority of whom are ethnic Hungarians with services held in Hungarian language.

== History ==
In the period of the Reformation, Rev Sztáray planted 120 Calvinist congregations in the region. In the period of the Ottoman Empire, regions of Hungary were part of the empire and some villages were destroyed. After the Ottomans were defeated, Hungarian Calvinists emerged from Debrecen and Szentes. In 1898, a whole Catholic village converted to the Calvinism because the Catholic Church refused to celebrate the mass in Hungarian language.

After World War I, territory of the present-day Serbian province of Vojvodina became part of the newly'established Kingdom of Yugoslavia. Prior to 1933 when the Reformed Church in Yugoslavia was founded, the church was part of the Reformed Church in Hungary. At that time, among Hungarians, there were German Calvinist congregations; the Germans arrived in this region in the 18th century. After World War II, the Germans were forced to leave the country.

The church affirms the Apostles Creed, Athanasian Creed, Nicene Creed, Heidelberg Catechism, Second Helvetic Confession, just like the official confessions of the Hungarian Reformed Church.

== Organization ==
The Reformed Christian Church in Serbia is organized into almost 50 congregations composed in two presbyteries, served by 19 pastors. The headquarters of the church is Feketić.

== See also ==
- Protestantism in Serbia

== Gallery ==
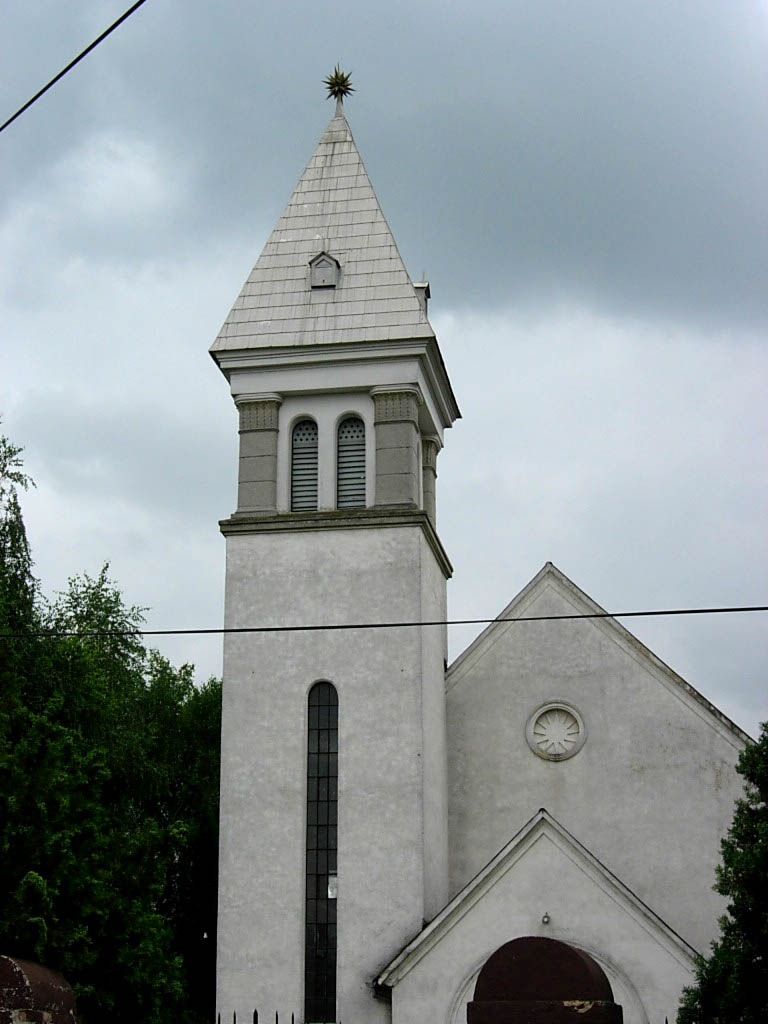
Church in Novi Sad
