= Protestant Reformed Christian Church in Croatia =

Reformed Episcopal diocese in Croatia

Protestant Reformed Christian Church in Croatia Protestantska reformirana kršćanska crkva u Hrvatskoj
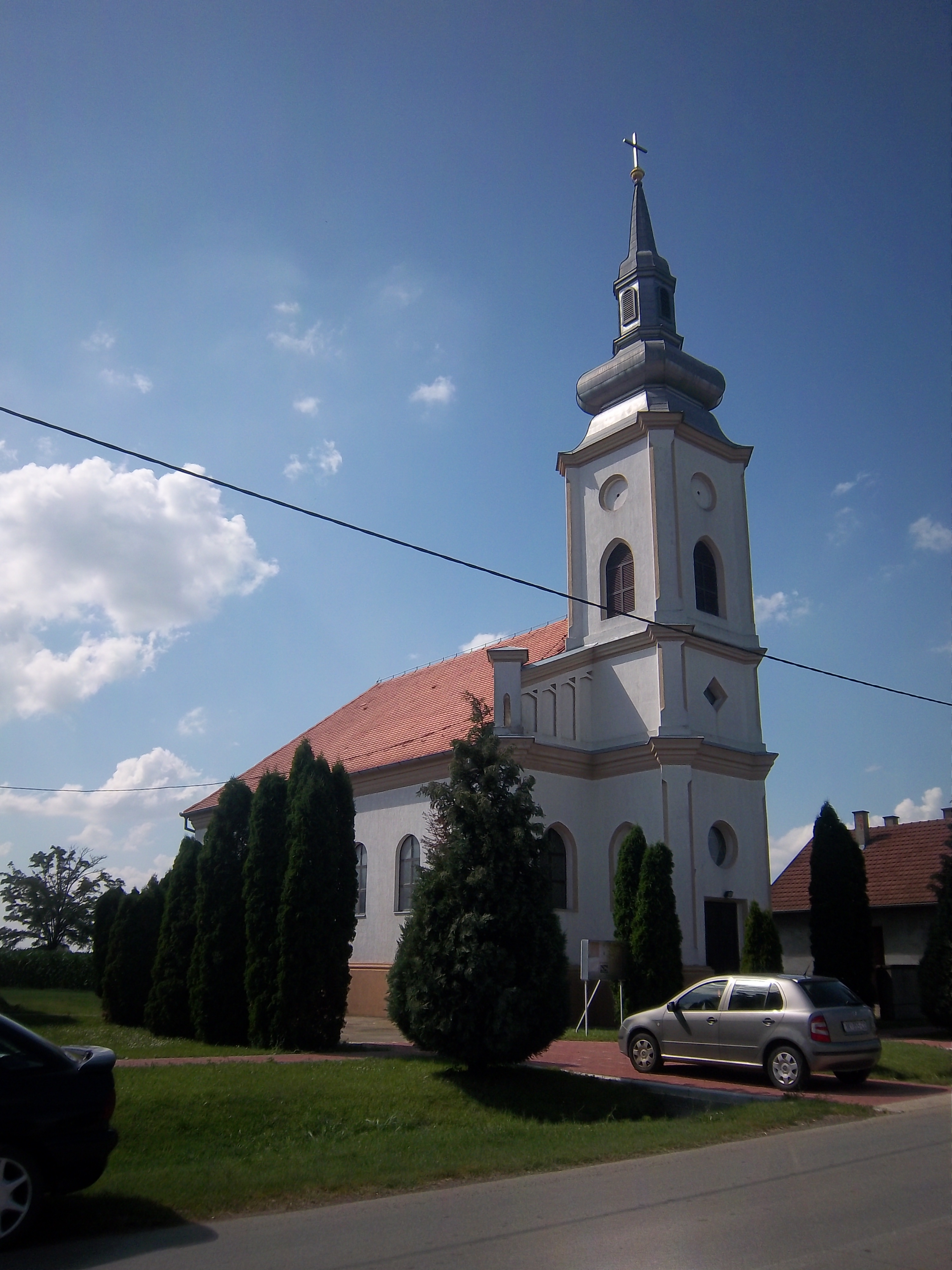
- The Protestant Reformed Christian Church in Tordinci

Location
- Territory: Croatia, Hungary, Serbia

Current leadership
- Parent church: Reformed Episcopal Church
- Bishop ordinary: Ray Sutton (ex officio)
- Assistant bishop: Jasmin Milić

Website
- www.prkc.hr

The Protestant Reformed Christian Church in Croatia (Croatian: Protestantska reformirana kršćanska crkva u Hrvatskoj) is an overseas diocese of the Reformed Episcopal Church.

It was founded on 24 May 2001, when several parishes withdraw from the Reformed Christian Calvinist Church in Croatia. The oldest parish was founded at Tordinci in 1551. There are parishes and missions in Zagreb, Osijek, Karlovac, Kapelna, Šibenik, and There is a mission church in Serbia in Belgrade.

The church confesses the Apostles Creed, the Nicene Creed, the Heidelberg Catechism and the 39 Articles of the Anglican community and uses the Book of Common Prayer. The church came under the jurisdiction of the Reformed Episcopal Church in 2011.

The Protestant Reformed Christian Church in Croatia is a member of the World Reformed Fellowship and of the Global Fellowship of Confessing Anglicans branch in Europe. Contacts with the Reformed Churches in the Netherlands (Liberated) was also established.

== See also ==
- Official website
- Reformed Church in Zagreb
