= Reformed Christian Calvinist Church in Croatia =

Protestant Christian denomination

- Classification: Protestant
- Theology: Calvinism
- Polity: Episcopal
- Associations: Hungarian Reformed Communion; World Communion of Reformed Churches
- Region: Croatia
- Congregations: 21
- Members: 3,000-4,000

The Reformed Christian Calvinist Church in Croatia (the Reformirana kršćanska kalvinska Crkva u Hrvatskoj in Croatian) became an autonomous church in 1993, following the disintegration of Yugoslavia. Croatia became an independent state. The first organising Synod was held in Retfala (Rétfalu) on January 30, 1993. The Reformed Church in Yugoslavia the predecessor denomination was founded in 1933, formerly it was part of the Reformed Church in Hungary. These are mostly Hungarian speaking congregations, which organised themselves as a church in 1551. There are a few Czech speaking and Croatian churches.

The church has 21 congregations, several preaching points and 3,000-4,000 members.

According to the statistics of the Hungarian Reformed Church it has 23 congregations and 4,000 members served by 4 female and 8 male pastors.

The church is a member of the World Communion of Reformed Churches and has relationship with the Presbyterian Church (USA), the Reformed Church in Hungary and the United Reformed Church in Great Britain.

The churches subscribe to the Apostles Creed, Athanasian Creed, Nicene Creed, Heidelberg Catechism and the Second Helvetic Confession.

The current Head Bishop of the church is Péter Penn. The Calvinist Church (led by Péter Szenn) claims that they have maintained contact with the Reformed Church of Hungary and international organizations, thus being the bearers of canonical continuity of the "original" church of 1993, even if they had to register under a new name/structure in 1999 to distance themselves from a controversial situation.

== Separations ==
The Protestant Reformed Christian Church in Croatia separated from the church.

The Croatian Reformed Christian Church was registered in 1993 as the legal successor of the Yugoslav Church in Croatia. This legal entity was the "mother church". According to the position of the Church (led by György Varga bishop - Hungarian Reformed Christian Church in Croatia as present), it continued to operate in this organization to present. The events of 1999: In 1999, due to internal church tensions and disagreements, part of the leadership, led by pastor Endre Lángh (later bishop), split off, and went in a different direction in a separate organization under the name Reformed Christian Calvinist Church in Croatia. Registration of the Calvinist Church: This separate group established and registered the organization called the Bishop's Office of the Croatian Reformed Christian Church (later called the Croatian Reformed Christian Calvinist Church, HRKKE) on March 4, 1999.
