= Pero Kovačević =

Croatian lawyer and politician

Member of Parliament
- In office 22 December 2003 – 11 January 2008
- Prime Minister: Ivo Sanader
- Constituency: II electoral district

Personal details
- Born: 2 March 1957 (age 69) Bosanska Dubica, Bosnia and Herzegovina, SFR Yugoslavia
- Party: Independent
- Other political affiliations: Croatian Party of Rights (1999–2008) Croatian Party of Rights dr. Ante Starčević (2009–2011)
- Children: 1
- Education: University of Zagreb
- Occupation: Politician
- Profession: Lawyer

Pero Kovačević (born 2 March 1957) is a Croatian lawyer and politician. Kovačević was the most active member of parliament during the 5th assembly of the Sabor, the Croatian parliament.

Kovačević is a member of the Association of Lawyers Vukovar 1991, an association dealing with crimes committed by forces of the Yugoslav People's Army and other Serb forces during the Croatian War of Independence.

== Early life ==
Kovačević was born in Bosanska Dubica, present day Bosnia and Herzegovina. He graduated from Faculty of Law at the University of Zagreb in 1980.

== Political career ==
In 1999, Kovačević joined nationalist Croatian Party of Rights (HSP). He was member of the party's presidency.

On 22 December 2003, Kovačević become member of Sabor as member of the nationalist HSP. During the 5th Sabor assembly, he was the most active member of parliament. In 2007, Kovačević entered into a disagreement with party's president, Anto Đapić. Because of that he announced his resignation from the party, however, he later pulled back his resignation and announced that he will run for party's president. On 5 April 2008 he was expelled from HSP.

After he left the HSP, in September 2009, Kovačević joined a splinter party, Croatian Party of Rights dr. Ante Starčević (HSP AS) led by Ruža Tomašić. Kovačević become party's deputy president.

On 30 January 2011, Kovačević made an indictment against Ivan Domagoj Milošević, at the time Government vice president, and his company Pastor for assumed crime committed during the process of privatization. State Audit mentioned Milošević's Pastor for irregularities in business, that is conversion of treasury shares into ordinary shares of and forgiveness of debt of 2.6 million by the supervisory board of his company. However, Milošević claimed that this privatization was just.

On 5 March 2011, after Kovačević applied an indictment for assumed crime during the process of privatization in companies Pastor and TDZ, and after he participated in veterans' demonstration for Croatian generals in Haague, he was suspended by his party HSP AS for 90 days; however, Kovačević announced his coming-out from the party because of disagreement with party's policy.

In the process of general Ivan Čermak in front of the International Criminal Tribunal for the former Yugoslavia, Kovačević was member of Čermak's defence team. He became one following advice of President of Croatia, Ivo Josipović. Čermak was trialed along with Ante Gotovina and Mladen Markač and was only one acquitted by the first-degree verdict.

During the campaign for the 2011 Croatian parliamentary election, Kovačević called all of the rights' parties to perform unitedly for the elections. President of the HSP, Daniel Srb, also invited all rights' parties to act unitedly, but Ruža Tomašić disagreed with Srb's initiative. Tomašić's HSP AS won one seat in the parliament, while Srb's HSP won none, even though his party won more votes.

In January 2012, during the promotion of Croatian entry into the European Union, Croatian foreign minister, Vesna Pusić stated that if Croatia doesn't enter the Union, Croatians would get any pensions. Kovačević accused Pusić for blackmailing and threatening, and stated that she, by such statement, violated the law. Soon after, Eurosceptics accused Pusić in front of the court for intimidation of citizens.
