= Battle for Antunovac =

1991 Croatian War of Independence battle

Battle of Antunovac
- Part of the Croatian War of Independence
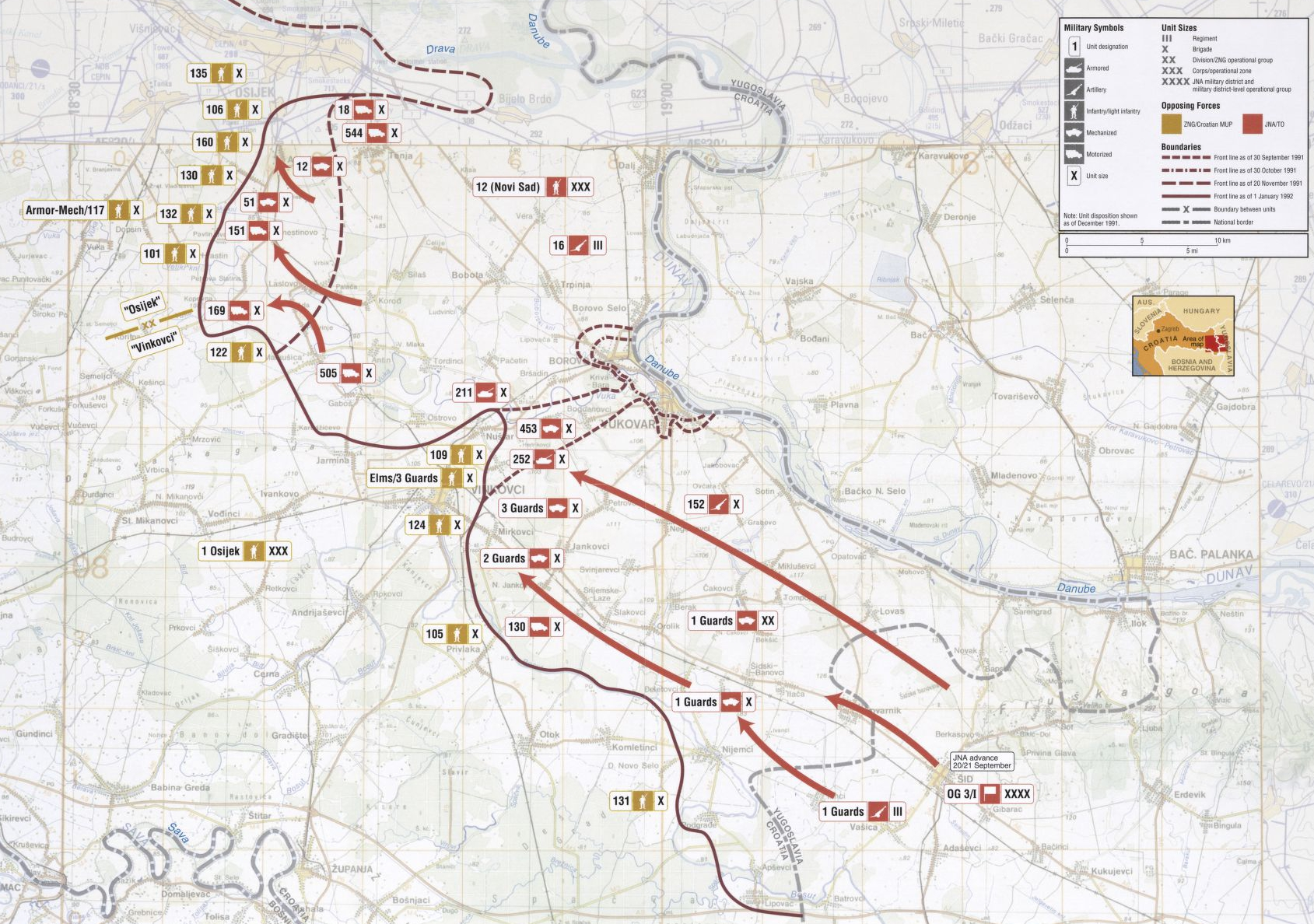
- Map showing the fighting in eastern Slavonia, September 1991 – January 1992
Date	20 November – 24 November 1991
Location	Antunovac, Croatia
Result	Yugoslav People's Army victory

Belligerents
Yugoslavia (Republic of Serbian Krajina) SAO Eastern Slavonia, Baranja and Western Syrmia	Croatia

Commanders and leaders
Željko Ražnatović	(Croatia) Nikola Huđin

Units involved
Yugoslav People's Army: Yugoslav Ground Forces; Eastern Slavonia, Baranja and Western Syrmia Territorial Defense; Serb Volunteer Guard	Armed Forces of Croatia: Croatian Army; Croatian Police; Croatian Defence Forces

Casualties and losses
Unknown	42 killed, mostly soldiers
- 22 Croat civilians killed

The Battle of Antunovac was a battle during the Croatian War of Independence. Fought between 20 November and 24 November 1991. It was fought between Croatia, and SAO Eastern Slavonia, Baranja and Western Syrmia which was supported by the Yugoslav People's Army. In the late afternoon of November 24, 1991, Antunovac was captured by the forces of the JNA and rebel Serbs.

== Background ==
In the afternoon of September 18, the attack on the military warehouse LUG, located between Čepin and Antunovac, begins. The attack is led by the military police and the Čepin company of the 106th brigade. A T-55 tank captured during the capture of the barracks in Osijek comes to the rescue and occupies a position on the road to Ivanovac near the railroad. Around noon on September 18, an armored-mechanized column moved from the direction of Tenja past the Rosinjača forest to Ekonomije Josipin Dvor (there was a white flag on the front tank), and they opened fire from cannons from the north towards the positions of the Antunovac defenders, who by then had become a company. On that occasion, a truck from the Ernestinova company that happened to be there was hit. On the night of September 19, in the early dawn, the enemy escapes from the LUG warehouse through the canals towards Antunovac, and members of the Čepin company and the military police enter the warehouse. During the action, a platoon of the Antunova company blocked the direction towards Antunovac, and one platoon was preparing for an intervention on the Novi Seleš economy.

The JNA soldiers who escaped from the warehouse were wandering in the canals. The 54 soldiers and commanders managed to get out of the warehouse complex undetected, and they set off in the direction of the Salaj canal towards Vladislavci and, reaching the Bobot canal towards Ernestinovo, continued in the direction of Ćeli. Having reached the front of the Matica forest, they notice the lines of defense of our troops, and return three kilometers to the connecting channel towards Antunovac and emerge into the forest between the Divoš substation and Ekonomije Novi Seleš. They continue their movement with the probable intention of connecting with the enemy forces in Tenja in the direction: Šuma - collection channel in front of Ekonomije Stari Orlovnjak. While moving in this direction, the locals of Antunovac spotted them as they ran across the road. The Antunova company, which held the defense towards Tenja, managed to take positions for the ambush with a quick maneuver. Around 13:00, the enemy group, unaware that they have been discovered, enters the area of the ambush and surrenders, realizing the futility of resistance. Many troops in Slavonia are armed with the weapons won in the LUG, and rural troops around Osijek are also being strengthened.

In the following days, Antunovac was defended from the south and east, and the troops that were going to help Laslovo passed through it. Artillery and PZO units occasionally took part in the defense of the village. The platoon also defended Orlovljak, in which they occasionally had the help of individual units of the 106th brigade, a platoon from Sjenjak and others. The JNA occupied Orlovnjak on October 6 without resistance, after several days of shelling. The attack on Ernestinovo and Seles began on November 20. The JNA moved to their initial positions at night and moved forward at dawn.

== Course of the battle ==
Around noon on November 22, a new order for the attack arrived, which was supposed to start at the same time as the 3rd brg. launched an attack on Ernestinovo. The commander of the group, together with the soldiers from Knez Domagoj and Sjenjak platoons, started to attack Seleš again. At 3:00p.m., they launched an attack from the left side, so they approached Seles through the cornfields. Approaching the yard, they came to the chimney where they were noticed. Engines of tanks and armored vehicles started to fire: four engines in the farm itself, three about 150 meters south towards old Seles and three southeast behind. After firing all the anti-tank weapons they had with them, they retreated through the cornfields to Antunovac. During the retreat, two soldiers were killed by an enemy mortar shell, 8 soldiers were seriously wounded, and a few were slightly wounded.

After the fall of Novi Seles, the defense of Antunovac was mostly based on soldiers staying in houses. On the south side, they settled in houses on the outskirts of Seles along the road. On the eastern side towards Tenja, on road that led from Tenja to the very center of Antunovac, there were two checkpoints. The most prominent point was in Široko Polje wasteland, 2 kilometers east of the center of Antunovac, surrounded by cornfields. At this point, the defenders of Antunovac alternated with different companies and platoons from the 106th brigade. When the tanks passed by ten days later, they could only hear them, but not see them. The second point, a kilometer closer to Antunovac, was in the basement of a new house next to the road itself.

The JNA continued their daily artillery attacks on the first line of defense of the brigade's units, and on the morning of December 4, 1991, they undertook a new tank-infantry attack on Paulin Dvor, where the first line of defense was held by members of the 3rd Company 3rd Battalion, 101st Brigade. Due to the penetration of the enemy into the center of the village and the separation of the forces of the defenders into two parts, as well as the lack of anti-tank weapons and the non-arrival of the promised reinforcements, the commander of the 2nd Battalion of the 101st Brigade ordered a retreat from Antunovac towards Ivanovovac. In the late afternoon of December 5, 1991, Antunovac was captured by the forces of the JNA and rebel Serbs.

During the attack, the defenders of Antunovac called Slobodan Tolja, the commander of the Čepin battalion of the 130th brigade, for help, but the brigade commander, Nikola Huđin, forbade it. Despite this, Tolja, on his own initiative, managed to send one company to Antunovac, but it was too late. Antunovac has already fallen. This was the second big mistake for the commander of the 130th brigade, Nikola Huđin, which is easily recognized as sabotage, and he was dismissed, and the brigade commander became Živko Mijić.
