= Ivan Vekić =

Ivan Vekić may refer to:

- Ivan Vekić (politician) (born 1938), Croatian politician and lawyer
- Ivan Vekić (handball player) (born 1998), Croatian handball player
