= Vekić =

Vekić (Serbian Cyrillic: Векић, pronounced [ʋěːkitɕ]; can be anglicized as Vekich) is a South Slavic surname which is mainly associated with Croats and Serbs. The name is commonly found in present-day Croatia, Serbia and Bosnia and Herzegovina.

Notable people with this surname:

- Donna Vekić (born 1996), Croatian tennis player
- Ivan Vekić (politician) (born 1938), Croatian politician and lawyer
- Ivan Vekić (handball player) (born 1998), Croatian handball player
- Mario Vekić (born 1982), Croatian rower
- Matko Vekić (born 1970), Croatian painter
- Žarko Vekić (born 1967), Serbian sprint canoeist
