= Battle of Ernestinovo =

- Part of the Croatian War of Independence
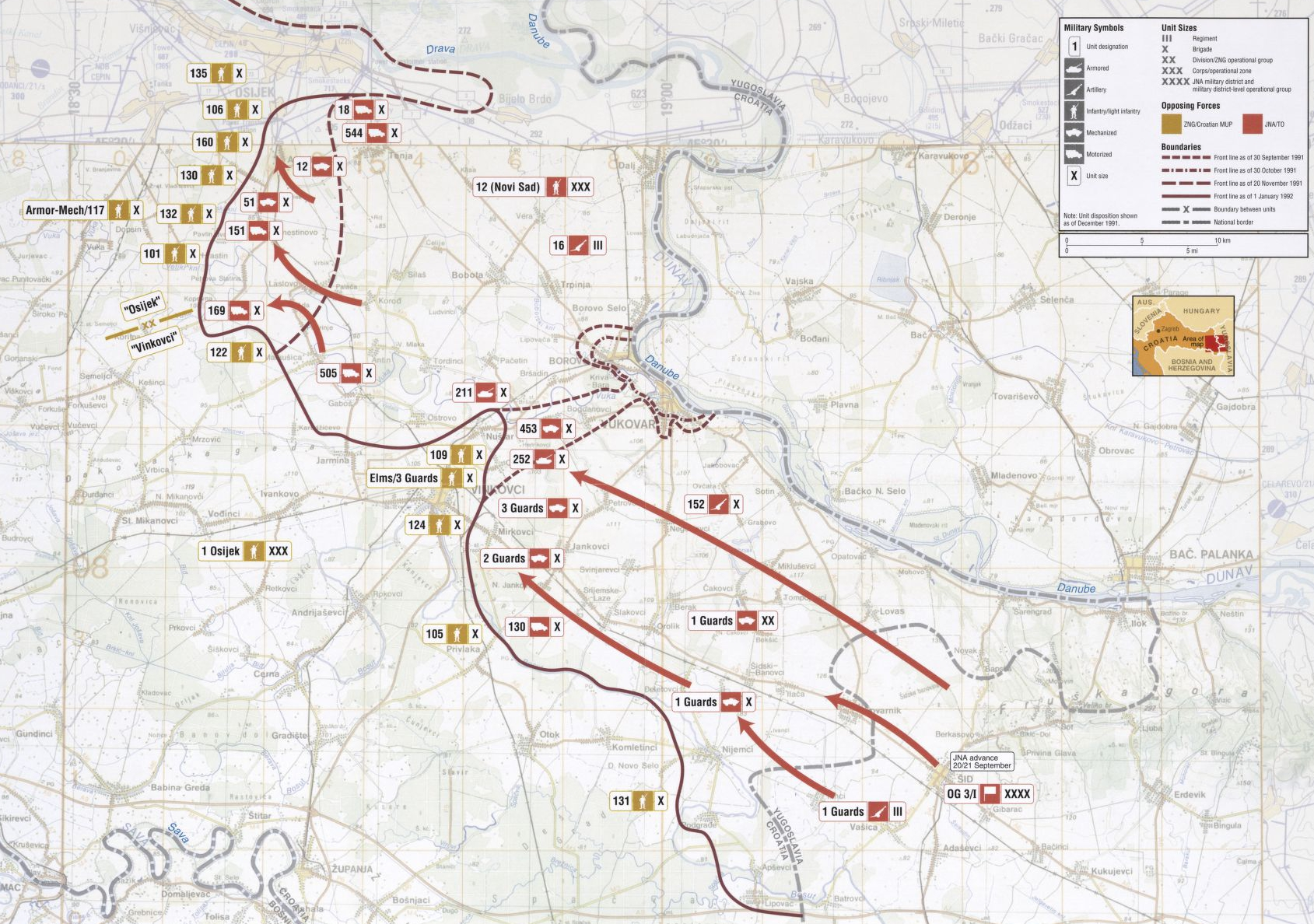
- Map showing the fighting in eastern Slavonia, September 1991 – January 1992
Date	20 November 1991
Location	Ernestinovo, Croatia
Result	Yugoslav People's Army victory

Belligerents
Yugoslavia (Republic of Serbian Krajina) SAO Eastern Slavonia, Baranja and Western Syrmia	Croatia

Commanders and leaders
(Socialist Federal Republic of Yugoslavia) Željko Ražnatović	(Croatia) Nikola Huđin

Units involved
Yugoslav People's Army: Yugoslav Ground Forces; Eastern Slavonia, Baranja and Western Syrmia Territorial Defense; Serb Volunteer Guard	Armed Forces of Croatia: Croatian Army; Croatian Police; Croatian Defence Forces

Casualties and losses
Unknown	41 killed, mostly soldiers

The Battle of Ernestinovo was a battle during the Croatian War of Independence fought on 20 November 1991. It was fought between Croatia, and SAO Eastern Slavonia, Baranja and Western Syrmia which was supported by the Yugoslav People's Army (JNA). The JNA took Ernestinovo then the battle for Antunovac began.

== Course of the battle ==
The attack on Ernestinovo and Seles began on November 20. Before five o'clock in the morning on November 20, 1991, a fierce attack by the JNA and Croat Serbs on defenders, who defended Ernestinovo until their last breath, began from all surrounding strongholds.

All the force fell on Ernestinovo that day - from aerial rocket fire to rocket fire with multi-barreled launchers and grenades, from all calibers of artillery and armored vehicles, all with infantry attacks. 11 tanks moved to the place and the defenders had nothing to defend themselves.

The fact that the place was inhabited made it even more difficult for the defenders, so around noon they started pulling people out of the southern part of the village towards Osijek.

That day and the next day, 27 people died, some civilians, some soldiers. A total of 41 people died in Ernestinovo.
