= Croatian Party of Rights =

Croatian Party of Rights Hrvatska stranka prava
- Abbreviation: HSP
- President: Marina Logarušić
- Deputy President: Stefan Novak
- Founder: Dobroslav Paraga; Ante Paradžik
- Founded: 25 February 1990
- Headquarters: Zagreb
- Newspaper: Croatian law (until 1993)
- Youth wing: Youth Club of the Croatian Party of Rights
- Military wing: Croatian Defence Forces (1991–1993)
- Membership (2011): 41,400
- Ideology: Croatian ultranationalism; National conservatism; Social conservatism; Croatian irredentism
- Political position: Far-right
- National affiliation: Coalition "Move" (2016)
- Colours: Black
- Slogan: Bog i Hrvati (God and Croats)
- Sabor: 0 / 151
- European Parliament: 0 / 12
- County Prefects: 0 / 21
- Mayors: 1 / 128

Party flag

Website
- http://hsp.hr/

The Croatian Party of Rights (Croatian: Hrvatska stranka prava, abbr. HSP) is an extra-parliamentary nationalist and far-right political party in Croatia. HSP reached the zenith of its popularity in the early 1990s, when its paramilitary wing, the Croatian Defence Forces, played a prominent role in the opening phase of the Yugoslav Wars.

== History ==
The HSP, along with other modern Croatian parties, such as the Croatian Pure Party of Rights, claim legacy to the Party of Rights, which was founded in 1861 and existed until 1929. The word "right(s)" in the party's name refers to the Croatian state right, the legal and moral reasons for the autonomy, independence, and sovereignty of Croatia.

=== 1991–1995 ===
A group of people restored Croatian Party of Rights on 25 February 1990. Dobroslav Paraga, the first president of the party acknowledged the historical bounds with the older Party of Rights. Soon, the party faced splits. Krešimir Pavelić, a former secretary of the party, became president of the new Croatian Democratic Party of Rights. Some other rights parties that claimed origin from old Party of Rights appeared. Croatian Party of Rights did not participate in the Croatian parliamentary election in 1990, which helped Croatian Democratic Union (HDZ) to win more votes.

The parties membership grew at a rapid rate, with the party having 18,000 members by the end of 1990, and grew to over 100,000 members by the end of fall in 1991, with thousands of supporters attending the parties rallies and protests.

HSP's political appeal and strength were at peak during the 1991–92 when Croatian Defence Forces, a military wing of the HSP, took on a role in the defence of Croatia. The party was perceived as embodying a radical iteration of Croatian freedom and independence. Paraga harshly and openly criticized Franjo Tuđman for his cooperation with Serbia and the conflict with Bosniaks in Bosnia and Herzegovina. The HSP used the writings of Ante Starčević and the writings of Ustaše ideologues such as Mile Budak to argue that Tuđman was not radical enough in his defence of the Croatian state.

The ruling HDZ cooperated with the HSP until the fall of Vukovar, after which the leaders of the HSP and HOS were imprisoned for "terrorist activities" and "obstruction of democratically elected government". Paraga and the Croatian Party of Rights appeared in front of a military tribunal on allegations of insubordination. They were later released. Paraga's main political and electoral platform was the creation of a Greater Croatia and the total defeat of the "Serbian aggressor". In the Croatian parliamentary election held in 1992, HDZ lost 7% of votes in favor of the Party of Rights.

One of the party's first post-communist leaders, Ante Paradžik was a political dissident during the former Yugoslavia when he was a student leader of the Croatian Spring, but he was killed during the war by assassination. Paraga found himself in a power struggle with his deputy, Anto Đapić. Paraga and Đapić fought a legal battle for the right to use the party name, a dispute that Paraga eventually lost. Paraga later formed the Croatian Party of Rights 1861 (HSP 1861) but by this time he was already politically marginalized.

On 17 September 1993, the leaders of the three rights parties held a meeting in Kutina and began preparations for a new union on a broad common rights program. The initiative for the meeting came from the new leaders of the HSP, Đapić and Boris Kandare, who invited leaders of the Croatian Pure Party of Rights and the Croatian National Democratic League but the meeting was unsuccessful, and those parties are still acting separately. During the parliamentary election in 1995, HSP lost popularity due to bad situation in the party in favor of HDZ.

=== 1995–present ===
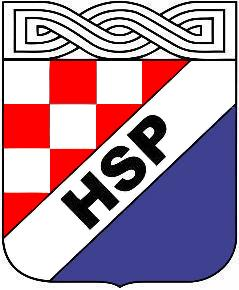
The old logo of the HSP, being much wider and shorter

At the 2003 Croatian parliamentary election, the HSP was in an alliance with Međimurje Party, Zagorje Democratic Party and non-partisan Slaven Letica. Together, they won 6.4% of the popular vote and 8 out of 151 seats, all for the HSP and Letica. In August 2005, the Croatian Democratic Republican Party, a right-wing political party established on 21 October 2000, by merger of three smaller right-wing parties, merged into the HSP.

The first president of HDRS was Joško Kovač. In September 2007, prominent members Miroslav Rožić and Tonči Tadić left the party. In November at the 2007 Croatian parliamentary election, the party suffered a setback, as it won 3.5% of the popular vote and a single seat in Sabor. After the 2009 Croatian local elections, which weren't particularly successful for the party either, turmoil in the party leadership escalated when a faction led by former representatives Ruža Tomašić and Pero Kovačević formed a splinter "Croatian Party of Rights — Dr. Ante Starčević".

At the party convention held on 7 November 2009, Đapić officially stepped down, allowing a new leader to be elected by party members. Daniel Srb defeated two other candidates to become the new president of the party. The HSP announced that during the Croatian parliamentary election in 2011 holders of their list in VII Electoral District (primary Lika and Gorski Kotar) would be exclusively women.

The party, for the first time, didn't win any parliamentary seats in the 2011 Croatian parliamentary election, which led to a crisis in Party of Rights; leaders of the Dalmatian branch of the party called for resignation of honorary president Anto Đapić. The president of the HSP in Split, Hrvoje Tomašević, asked for Đapić's resignation from politics and election in the party. He was supported by the president of the HSP in Dubrovnik, Denis Šešelj. This appeal resulted in Đapić's resignation from party politics.

On 28 January 2013, the Presidency of the Croatian Party of Rights expelled its former honorary president Đapić from the party. Srb, the party's president, said that Đapić expelled as he broke his promise that he wouldn't be active in politics. Đapić said that he was shocked by the decision.

On 16 July 2020, the county council of HSP Split reached a unanimous conclusion on demanding the resignation of the parties presidency and the president, Karlo Starčević, which he strongly opposed at the presidency session. HSP Split officials gave a statement, in which they resigned and left the party.

== Election results ==
=== Legislative ===
The following is a summary of the party's results in legislative elections for the Croatian Parliament. The "Total votes" and "Percentage" columns include sums of votes won by pre-election coalitions HSP had been part of and the "Total seats" column includes sums of seats won by HSP in election constituencies plus representatives of ethnic minorities affiliated with HSP.

Election	Leader	In coalition with	Votes won	Percentage	Seats won	Change	Government
Election	Leader	In coalition with	(Coalition totals)		(HSP only)		Government
1992	Dobroslav Paraga	None	186,000	7.1%	5 / 138	New	Opposition
1995	Anto Đapić	None	121,095	5.0%	4 / 127	▼1	Opposition
2000	Anto Đapić	HKDU	152,699	5.2%	4 / 151	0	Opposition
2003	Anto Đapić	ZDS–MS	157,987	6.4%	8 / 151	▲4	Opposition
2007	Anto Đapić	None	86,865	3.5%	1 / 153	▼7	Opposition
2011	Daniel Srb	HS	72,360	3.0%	0 / 151	▼1	Extra-parliamentary
2015	Daniel Srb	HKS–OS	13,980	0.6%	0 / 151	0	Extra-parliamentary
2016	Daniel Srb	HČSP–ABH–OS	13,082	0.7%	0 / 151	0	Extra-parliamentary
2020	Karlo Starčević	NHR–GO	7,266	0.44%	0 / 151	0	Extra-parliamentary
2024	Nikica Augustinović	HDSS–HB	18,128	0.85%	0 / 151	0	Extra-parliamentary

=== Presidential ===
The following is a list of presidential candidates endorsed by HSP in elections for President of Croatia.

Election year(s)	Candidate	1st round		2nd round		Result
Election year(s)	Candidate	Votes	%	Votes	%	Result
1992	Dobroslav Paraga	144,695	5.51 (#4)			Lost
2000	Anto Đapić	49,288	1.84 (#5)			Lost
2005	Slaven Letica	57,748	2.59 (#5)			Lost
2009–10	Dragan Primorac	117,154	5.93 (#6)			Lost
2014–15	Milan Kujundžić	112,585	6.30 (#4)			Lost
2019-20	Miroslav Škoro	465,704	24.75 (#3)			Lost
2024-25	Tomislav Jonjić	82,787	5.15 (#5)			Lost

=== European Parliament ===
Election	List leader	Coalition	Votes	%	Seats	+/–	EP Group
Election	List leader	Coalition	Coalition		HSP		EP Group
2013	Daniel Srb	None	10,317	1.39 (#9)	0 / 12	New	–
2014	Milan Kujundžić	Alliance for Croatia	63,437	6.88 (#4)	0 / 11	0	–
2019	Dražen Keleminec	NHR	46,970	4.37 (#7)	0 / 12	0	–
2024	Božo Petrov	Most–HS	30,155	4.01 (#6)	0 / 12	0	–

== See also ==
- Croatian Party of Rights of Bosnia and Herzegovina – sister party in Bosnia and Herzegovina
- Croatian Pure Party of Rights – split from the HSP in 1992
- Croatian Party of Rights 1861 – split from the HSP in 1995
- Autochthonous Croatian Party of Rights
- Croatian Party of Rights Dr. Ante Starčević – split from the HSP in 2009
- Party of Croatian Right
- Party of Rights of Bosnia and Herzegovina 1861

== Bibliography ==
- Ramet, Sabrina P. (1999). The radical right in Central and Eastern Europe since 1989. The Pennsylvania University Press. ISBN 0-271-01810-0.
- Stallaerts, Robert (2010). Historical dictionary of Croatia. Scarecrow Press. ISBN 978-0-271-01810-2.
