= Divoš =

Divoš may refer to:

- Divoš, Serbia, a village in Serbia near Sremska Mitrovica
- Divoš, Croatia, a village in Croatia near Ernestinovo
