= Anto Đapić =

Croatian politician

Mayor of Osijek
- In office 23 January 2009 – 4 June 2009
- Preceded by: Gordan Matković
- Succeeded by: Krešimir Bubalo
- In office June 2005 – 3 September 2007
- Preceded by: Zlatko Kramarić
- Succeeded by: Gordan Matković

Member of the Croatian Parliament
- In office 7 January 1992 – 6 February 2009
- Succeeded by: Daniel Srb
- Constituency: IV electoral district

2nd President of the Croatian Party of Rights
- In office 11 September 1993 – 7 November 2009
- Deputy: Daniel Srb
- Preceded by: Dobroslav Paraga
- Succeeded by: Daniel Srb

Personal details
- Born: 22 August 1958 (age 68) Čaprazlije, PR Bosnia and Herzegovina, FPR Yugoslavia
- Party: Croatian Party of Rights

Anto Đapić (born 22 August 1958) is a Croatian far right politician and the former president of the Croatian Party of Rights (HSP). He served as a representative in the Croatian Parliament, a post he was elected to at the 1992, 1995, 2000, 2003 and 2007 elections.

== Biography ==
=== Early life ===
Đapić was born in Čaprazlije, Livno municipality, SR Bosnia and Herzegovina, Yugoslavia (now in Bosnia and Herzegovina). The Đapić family had a history of supporting the old Croatian Party of Rights, and later the Ustaše regime. His father and uncles chose to go to West Germany on permanent work instead of living in Yugoslavia, but Anto, his mother and brother lived in Osijek since 1962. Đapić considers Osijek to be his hometown. Đapić lost his mother in a car crash when he was a teenager, so he had to do manual labour while studying law at Osijek University. Đapić obtained a law degree in 1989.

=== Political career ===
In 1989, Đapić first joined Franjo Tuđman's Croatian Democratic Union (HDZ). He was one of the party's organizers in Osijek, but he was expelled after a short time for using the "Za dom spremni" salute. In 1991, he joined the Croatian Party of Rights (HSP), which was renewed a year earlier. After the assassination of Ante Paradžik, he was named the party's Vice President. Đapić was also, for a short period of time, a commander of paramilitary units called HOS (Hrvatske Obrambene Snage - Croatian Defence Forces), which were organized by Croatian Party of Rights. Later the HOS was merged with the Croatian Army (in Croatia) and the Croatian Defense Council (in Bosnia).

In 1992, Đapić was elected to the Croatian Parliament. In 1993, he was named the vice-president of HSP. The previous president Dobroslav Paraga claimed Đapić was elected illegally, and he later formed the new party Croatian Party of Right 1861, which has failed at each parliamentary election since 1993.

In the 1995 election, HSP won 4.8% of the vote, but after a recount, 5.01% was claimed to be the official result, which meant that HSP remained represented in the Parliament. With the war being over, the party took more and more criticism for its neo-Ustaša views. However, HSP led by Đapić maintained small but solid support among the voters. In 2000, this time in coalition with Croatian Christian Democratic Union (HKDU), HSP kept four Parliament seats. Đapić led a presidential campaign the same year, finishing a distant fifth. Since then, he and his party endeavoured to change their perception among voters. HSP continues to oppose the existence of the Hague War Crimes Tribunal, to hold eurosceptic views and is socially very conservative. Đapić likened the possible legal recognition of same-sex marriages to "Sodom and Gomorrah".

In June 2005, Đapić became mayor of Osijek, but he lost this position in 2009. In late 2009, the HSP split yet again. A new party, Croatian Party of Rights Dr. Ante Starčević, with Ruža Tomašić as party leader was formed. The party's leadership accused Đapić for the weakening of HSP's standing in the Sabor. Đapić was replaced as the president of the party at the November 2009 convention by Daniel Srb.

In December 2011 Đapić announced his retirement from politics. In 2013, he briefly returned to active politics by announcing his intention to run for the mayor of Osijek again, but was expelled from the HSP shortly thereafter.

He ran for president in 2019 but was eliminated in the first round, winning 4,001 or 0.21% of the vote, and finishing 10th out of 11 candidates. His best result was in Osijek-Baranja County where he obtained 0.38% of the vote.

== Family ==
Đapić is married with one daughter.

== Notes ==
Political offices
Preceded by Zlatko Kramarić	Mayor of Osijek; 2005–2009	Succeeded by Krešimir Bubalo
Party political offices
Preceded by Dobroslav Paraga	President of the Croatian Party of Rights; 1993–2009	Succeeded by Daniel Srb
