= Areas of Special State Concern =

Underdeveloped areas of Croatia targeted for improvement

- Croatian: Područja od posebne državne skrbi

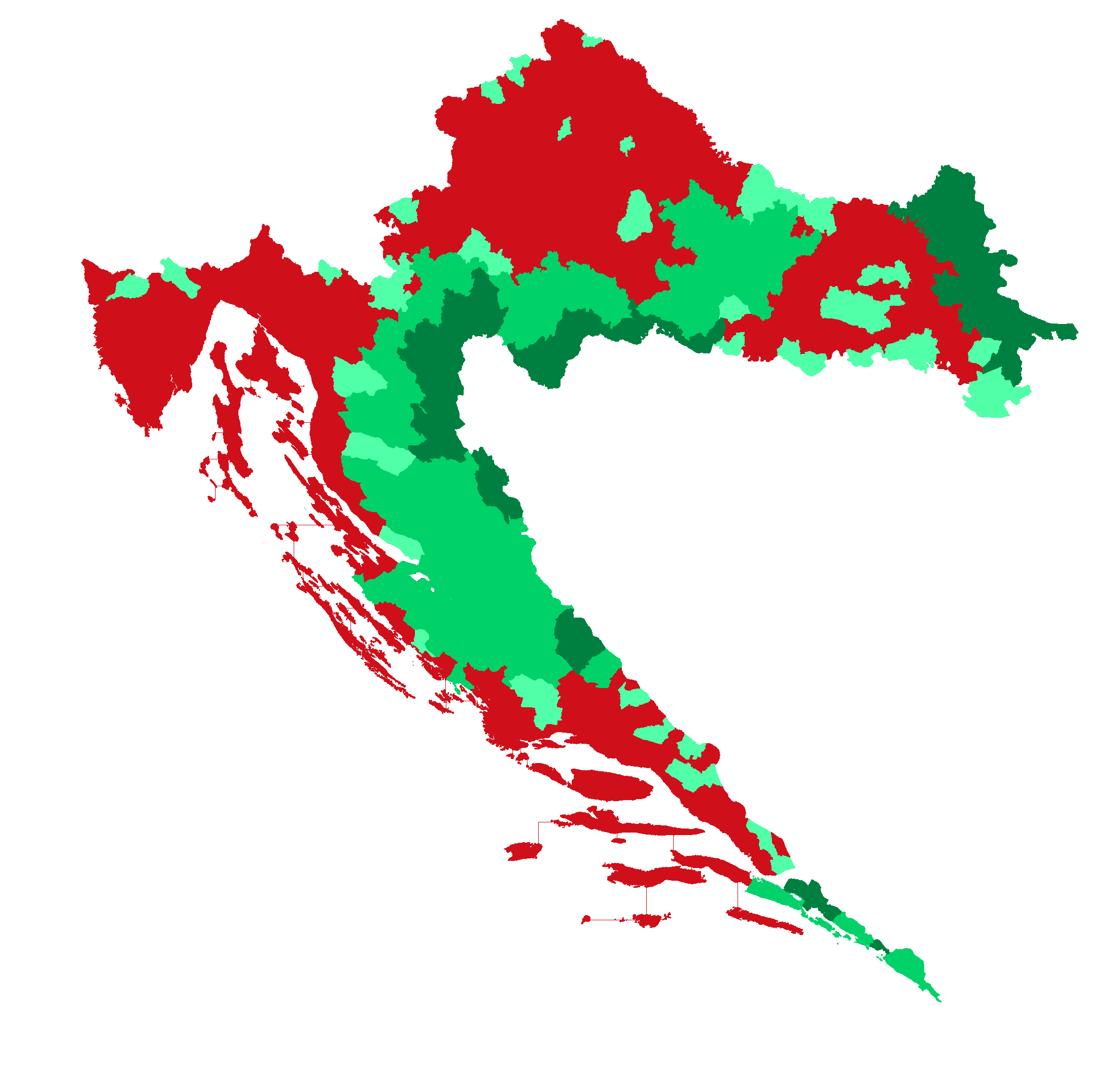
- Map of Croatia with the Areas of Special State Concern marked with shades of green

Regional Development Program of the Central Government overview
- Formed: 1996
- Type: Government's Regional Development Program
- Jurisdiction: Croatia
- Headquarters: Zagreb

Areas of Special State Concern (ASSC) (Croatian: Područja od posebne državne skrbi, PPDS) in Croatia are areas of relative underdevelopment compared to the rest of the country in which Croatian Government implements certain policies aimed at achieving balanced regional development. In addition to challenges faced by many other non-urban communities in Croatia, the ASSC areas face specific challenges which are a result of the 1991–1995 Croatian War of Independence, and include the return and reintegration of war refugees, lack of entrepreneurial capacity and support for business, destroyed or inadequate infrastructure, land under land-mines and insufficient social reintegration.

== Categories ==
The Areas are subdivided into three categories:

- The First Category is covering settlements directly on the state border which were under the rebel control during the war and whose seat is less than 15 km away from the border and have less than 5,000 inhabitants according to the 1991 census as well as the entire area of the former self-proclaimed Eastern Slavonia, Baranja and Western Syrmia.
- The Second Category covers all the other regions which were under the rebel control but are not in the first category.
- The Third Category includes areas which are lagging behind the rest of the country in its development. Particular financial contribution to the Government activities in the ASSC areas is provided by the Regional Development Fund established in 2001.

The Act's general provisions determine that only up to 15% of the total population of Croatia may live in the areas which are determined as the ASSC. 170 units of local government in Croatia or some of their settlements are part of the ASSC and in 2001 679,657 inhabitants lived on their territory (15.3% of the total population), with 217,876 in the First, 264,031 in the Second and 197,750 in the Third Category.

== History ==
The legal foundation for the government's activities is the Act on Areas of Special State Concern which belongs to the group of the four regional acts, though are mostly implemented at local and municipal level. The Act was enacted in 1996 which brought flexibility with municipalities and settlements entering or leaving the ASSC depending on their indicators. In 2002 the Act went through a major amendment that divided the ASSC into three major categories. A new law with improved measures for demographic renewal and tax benefits was passed in 2008.

== ASSC Areas by County ==
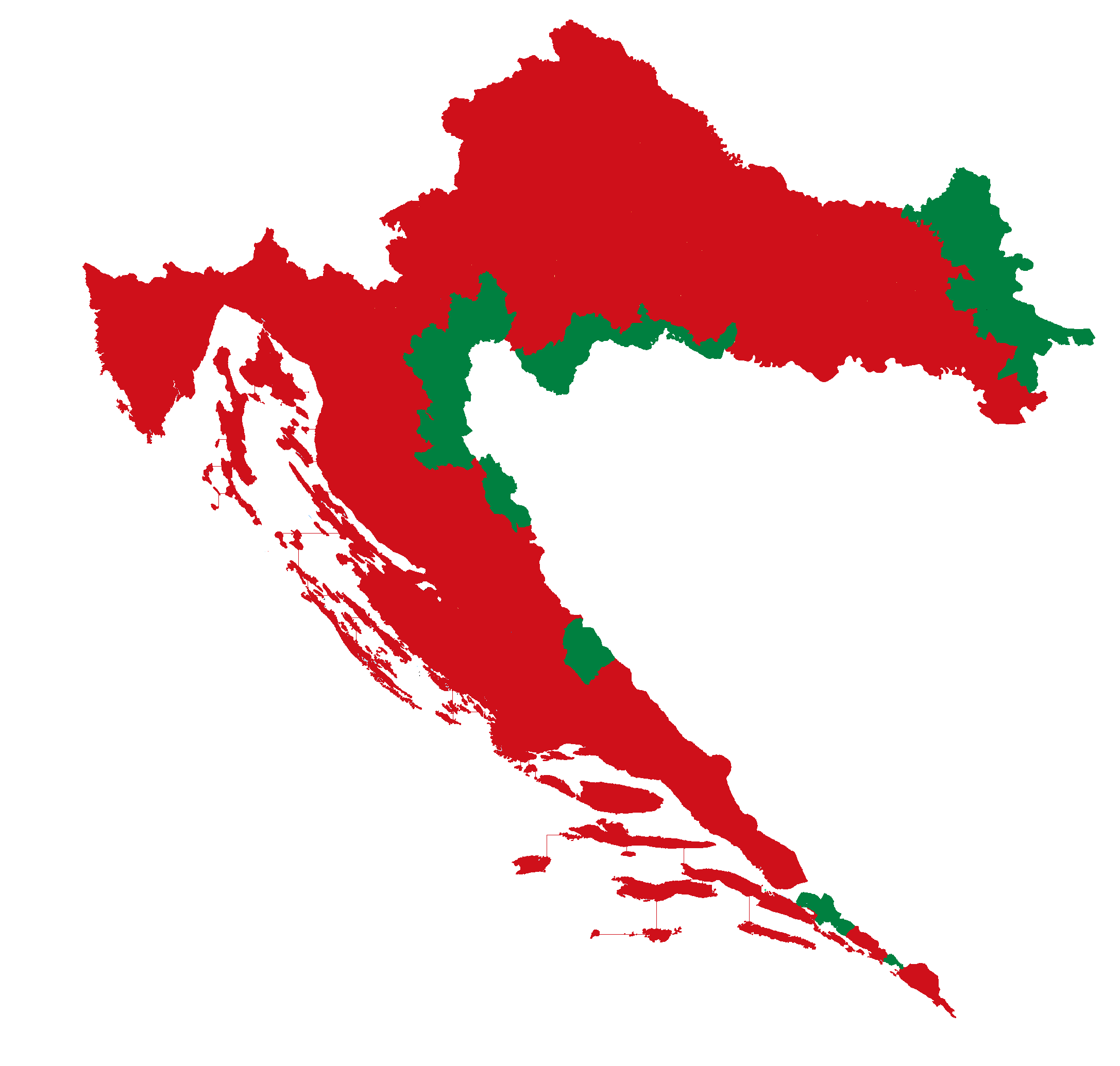
First Category ASSC's

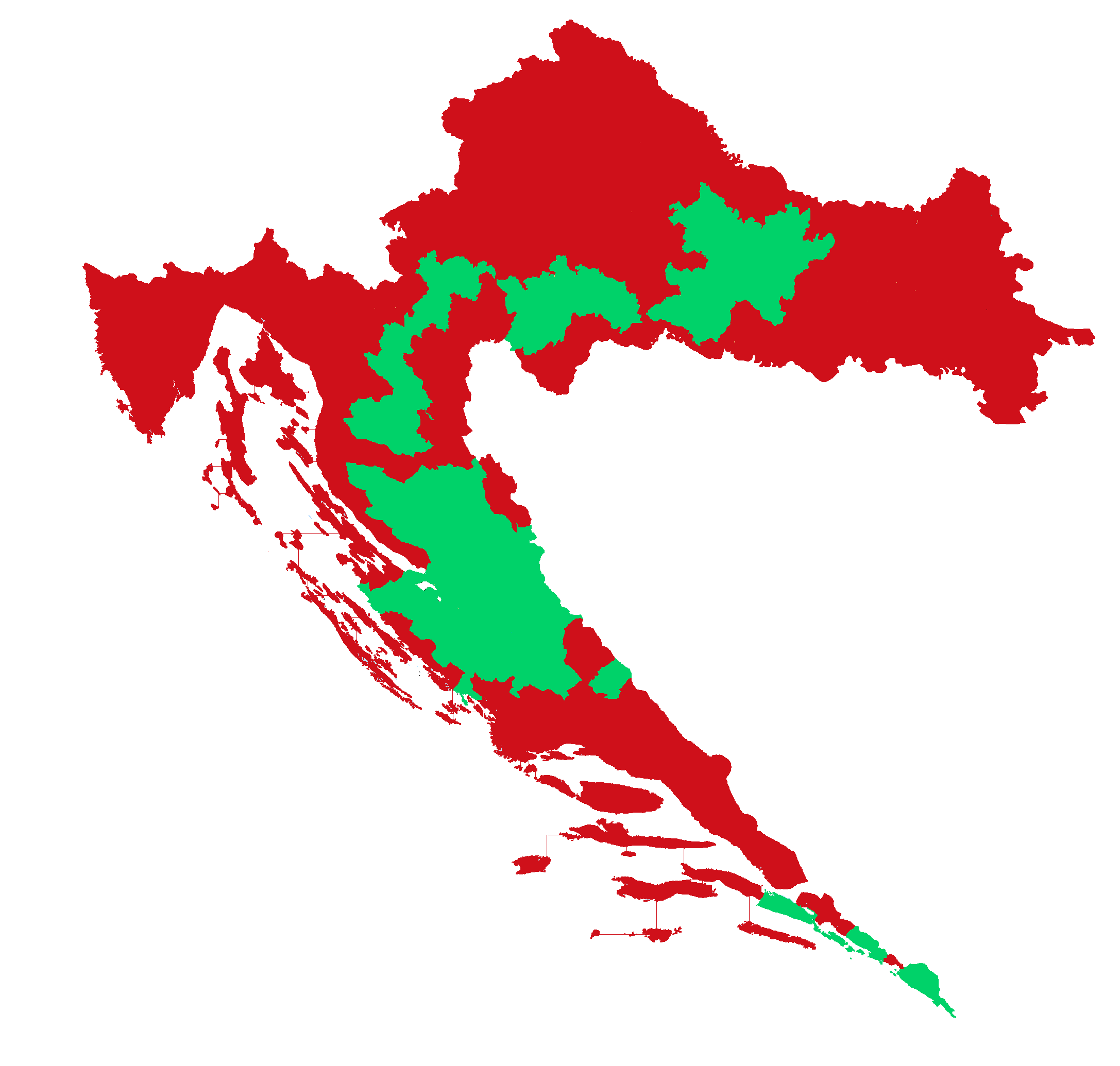
Second Category ASSC's

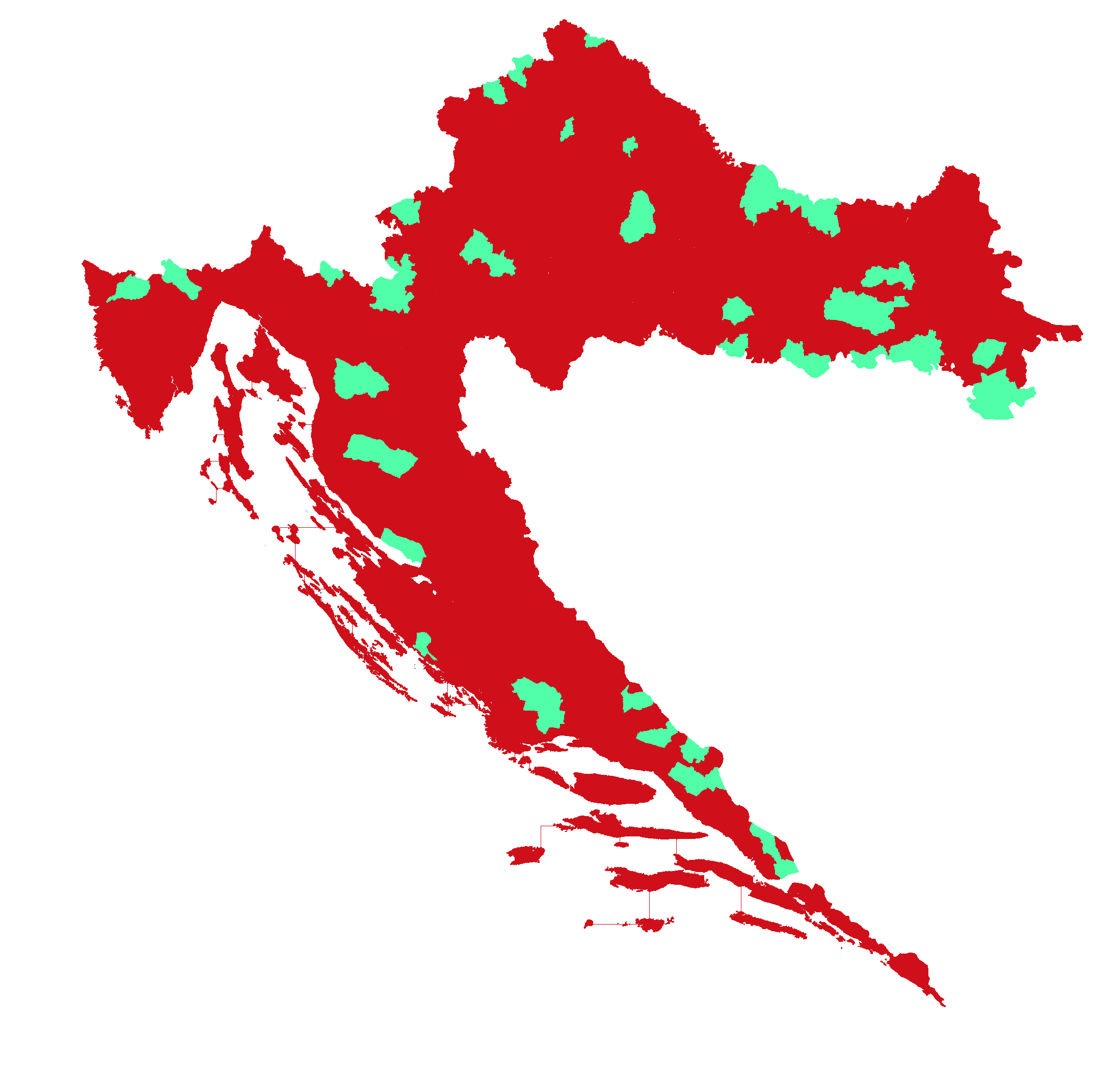
Third Category ASSC's

County	First Category ASSC Area	Second Category ASSC Area	Third Category ASSC Area
Bjelovar-Bilogora	* X	*Daruvar (part-2 settlements); *Đulovac; *Grubišno Polje; *Sirač; *Velika Pisanica; *Veliki Grđevac	*Zrinski Topolovac; *Berek; *Ivanska
Brod-Posavina	*Dragalić; *Stara Gradiška	*Gornji Bogićevci; *Okučani	*Bebrina; *Gundinci; *Klakar; *Oprisavci; *Sikirevci; *Slavonski Šamac
Dubrovnik-Neretva	*Dubrovačko Primorje; *Župa Dubrovačka	*Dubrovnik (part-25 settlements); *Konavle; *Ston	*Pojezerje; *Kula Norinska; *Zažablje
Istria	* X	* X	*Grožnjan; *Lanišće; *Oprtalj
Karlovac	*Cetingrad; *Rakovica; *Slunj; *Vojnić	*Barilovići; *Josipdol; *Karlovac (part-33 settlements); *Krnjak; *Lasinja; *Plaški; *Saborsko; *Tounj	*Bosiljevo; *Generalski Stol; *Netretić; *Ribnik
Koprivnica-Križevci	* X	* X	*Gornja Rijeka
Krapina-Zagorje	* X	* X	*Kraljevec na Sutli; *Zagorska Sela
Lika-Senj	*Donji Lapac; *Plitvička Jezera	*Gospić; *Lovinac; *Otočac; *Udbina; *Vrhovine	*Brinje; *Perušić
Međimurje	* X	* X	*Dekanovec; *Podturen
Osijek-Baranja	*Antunovac; *Beli Manastir; *Bilje; *Čeminac; *Darda; *Draž; *Erdut; *Ernestinovo; *Jagodnjak; *Kneževi Vinogradi; *Osijek (part-4 settlements); *Petlovac; *Popovac; *Šodolovci	* X	*Levanjska Varoš; *Podgorač; *Podravska Moslavina; *Punitovci; *Satnica Đakovačka; *Semeljci; *Trnava; *Vladislavci
Požega-Slavonia	* X	*Brestovac; *Lipik; *Pakrac; *Velika	*Čaglin
Primorje-Gorski Kotar	* X	* X	*Brod Moravice
Šibenik-Knin	*Civljane; *Kijevo	*Biskupija; *Drniš; *Ervenik; *Kistanje; *Knin; *Promina; *Ružić; *Skradin; *Vodice (part-3 settlements)	*Unešić
Sisak-Moslavina	*Donji Kukuruzari; *Dvor; *Gvozd; *Hrvatska Dubica; *Hrvatska Kostajnica; *Jasenovac; *Majur; *Topusko	*Glina; *Novska; *Petrinja; *Sisak (part-5 settlements); *Sunja	* X
Split-Dalmatia	*Vrlika	*Hrvace	*Cista Provo; *Proložac; *Lećevica; *Lokvičići; *Otok; *Runovići; *Zagvozd; *Prgomet
Varaždin	* X	* X	*Cestica; *Donja Voća; *Bednja
Virovitica-Podravina	* X	*Čačinci; *Mikleuš; *Slatina (part-3 settlements); *Virovitica (part-1 settlement); *Voćin	*Gradina; *Sopje; *Suhopolje; *Crnac; *Čađavica
Vukovar-Syrmia	*Bogdanovci; *Borovo; *Ilok; *Lovas; *Markušica; *Negoslavci; *Nijemci; *Nuštar; *Stari Jankovci; *Tompojevci; *Tordinci; *Tovarnik; *Trpinja; *Vinkovci (part-Mirkovci); *Vukovar	* X	*Babina Greda; *Drenovci; *Gunja; *Vođinci; *Vrbanja; *Otok
Zadar	* X	*Benkovac; *Gračac; *Jasenice; *Lišane Ostrovičke; *Novigrad; *Obrovac; *Polača; *Poličnik; *Posedarje; *Stankovci; *Škabrnja; *Zadar (part-2 settlements); *Zemunik Donji	*Galovac; *Pakoštane; *Starigrad
Zagreb	* X	* X	*Pisarovina; *Pokupsko; *Žumberak

== See also ==
- Structural Funds and Cohesion Fund
- List of special economic zones
- Minefields in Croatia
