= Croatian Defence Forces =

Croatian Defence Forces Hrvatske obrambene snage
- Patch of the Croatian Defence Forces
- Active: 22 January 1991 – 5 April 1993
- Disbanded: September 1991 (Croatia); 21 August 1992 (Bosnia and Herzegovina)
- Country: Croatia; Republic of Bosnia and Herzegovina
- Allegiance: Croatian Party of Rights
- Branch: Paramilitary; Army
- Role: Guerrilla warfare Urban warfare Patrolling; Security operations Counterinsurgency
- Size: 8,000 – 24,000
- Headquarters: Zagreb, Croatia; Ljubuški, Bosnia and Herzegovina
- Nickname: Blacks (Crnci)
- Motto: Za dom spremni
- Colors: Black
- March: Himna HOS-a
- Engagements: Croatian War of Independence; 1991 Yugoslav campaign in Croatia; Battle of the Barracks; Battle of Gospić; Battle of Vukovar; Battle of Ernestinovo; Battle for Antunovac; Siege of Slunj; Siege of Dubrovnik; Operation Steel '93; Bosnian War; 1992 Yugoslav campaign in Bosnia; Siege of Sarajevo; Siege of Mostar; Battle of Kupres (1992); Operation Corridor 92; Siege of Kotor Varoš

Commanders
- Political Leader: Dobroslav Paraga
- 1st Chief of Staff: Ante Paradžik
- 2nd Chief of Staff: Blaž Kraljević

Insignia
- Flag

The Croatian Defence Forces (Croatian: Hrvatske obrambene snage, HOS) were the paramilitary arm of the Croatian Party of Rights (HSP) from 1991 to 1992, during the first stages of the Yugoslav Wars. During the Croatian War of Independence, the HOS organised several early companies and participated in Croatia's defence. At the peak of the war in Croatia, the HOS was several battalions in size. The first HOS units were headed by Ante Paradžik, an HSP member who was killed by a group of Croatian police officers at a checkpoint near the Ministry of Internal Affairs building in September 1991. After the November 1991 general mobilisation in Croatia and the January 1992 cease-fire, the majority of the HOS was absorbed by the Croatian Army.

The HOS units in Bosnia and Herzegovina consisted of Croats, Bosniaks and foreign volunteers led by Blaž Kraljević. On 9 August 1992, Kraljević and eight staff members were assassinated by soldiers of the Croatian Defence Council under the command of Mladen Naletilić Tuta. Following the assassination, the HVO forcibly dismantled the HOS command structure. The remaining HOS units were subsequently absorbed into the HVO or the Army of the Republic of Bosnia and Herzegovina (ARBiH) as the Croat-Bosniak War intensified, with the final HOS unit officially dissolving on 5 April 1993 in central Bosnia.

== History ==
=== Croatia ===
==== Origin ====
The Croatian Party of Rights was reestablished in Croatia on 26 February 1990, with Dobroslav Paraga president and Ante Paradžik vice-president. The Croatian civilian population began arming itself, and on 21 December 1990 the Serbs of Croatia rose; soon, the Yugoslav People's Army combined with the insurgent Serbs and the Croatian Party of Rights considered forming its military wing.

Although the first HOS squad was established in January, the HOS was officially founded on 25 June 1991 by Dobroslav Paraga, Ante Paradžik, Alija Šiljak and other leaders of the HSP. Soon after establishing the HOS general staff, Paradžik became its chief.

The HSP received donations from the Croatian diaspora and HSP branches in Australia and Canada, enabling it to buy weapons and increase its membership. However, not every HSP member supported a military wing, and secretary Krešimir Pavelić left the party in protest. Many HOS recruits came from the diaspora, Bosnia and Herzegovina, and overseas. In addition, HOS attracted trained soldiers from abroad.

The HOS used the Roman salute and wore black uniforms; its headquarters featured portraits of Ustaše leaders and some of its units were named after Ustaša generals. Their outward association with WWII-era fascists prompted worries to the Croatian government who feared their image would damage Croatia's international reputation. By early 1992 they were disbanded and recruited into the Croatian Army.

==== Battles ====
At the beginning of the Croatian War of Independence, the HOS comprised about 6,000 soldiers. Although they were members of the Croatian National Guard (ZNG), they obeyed orders from HOS officers. Because of an unwritten rule that HOS members could only be members of the HSP, the HOS was considered a party paramilitary organisation. The HOS and the ZNG were involved in the Battle of the Barracks and other minor battles in Croatia. The HOS increased in popularity within the HSP, and soon the HOS were in nearly every town where the HSP was active. On 10 September 1991, Paraga and Paradžik organised a demonstration of a HOS company for 10,000 spectators in Jelačić Square. Shortly after the demonstration, the company was involved in the Battle of Vukovar under Robert Šilić.

At this time, HOS units were founded in Dalmatia. Until May 1991, Dalmatian HOS units were company-sized. In an agreement between Paraga and the Slovene Minister of Defence Janez Janša, the units were sent to Slovenia for training. By October 1991 the unit had grown to battalion size; it was called the 9th Battalion and was commanded by Jozo Radanović, president of the HSP branch in Split.

Paradžik was shot at a police checkpoint near Zagreb on 21 September 1991, in what was described by the authorities as an accident. They justified the killing because the police "received an anonymous tip that the Martić's family were in the car."

Following the fall of Vukovar in November 1991, the Croatian government began a general mobilisation, and most HOS militiamen joined the Croatian Army. Paraga refused to merge his units with the forces controlled by the Croatian government, and armed HOS units occupied a building in Zagreb to serve as their headquarters. Paraga and party vice-president Anto Đapić, who assumed the leadership position following the killing of Paradžik, were subsequently charged with treason and planning a coup d’état, though the charges were later dropped.

=== Bosnia and Herzegovina ===
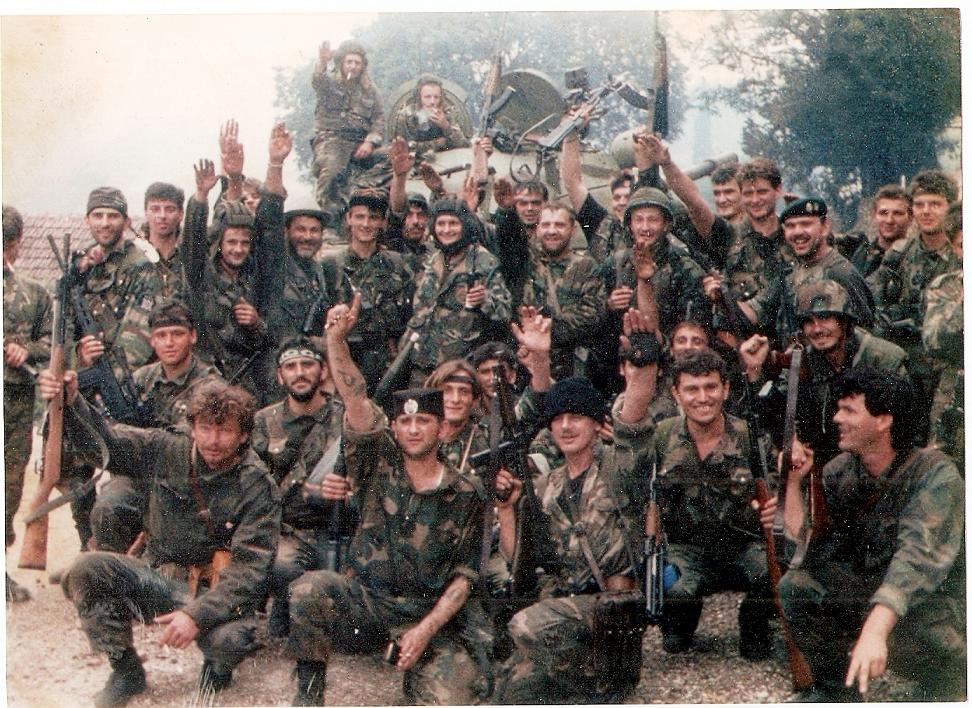
HOS soldiers in Čapljina c. 1992

The Croatian Defence Forces in Bosnia and Herzegovina had its headquarters in Ljubuški and mostly operated in the southern area of the country. Their commander was Blaž Kraljević. At the beginning of the Bosnian War, they fought against the Serb forces together with the HVO and ARBiH. The strength of HOS forces in Bosnia and Herzegovina was estimated at up to 5,000 members armed with infantry weapons. They included many Bosniaks in their ranks and advocated a confederation between Croatia and Bosnia and Herzegovina, frequently using the slogan "Croatia to the Drina, Bosnia to the Adriatic". In June 1992, the HOS participated in breaking the JNA-VRS siege of Mostar, when the HV and HVO pushed the Serb forces towards eastern Herzegovina.

Relations between the HVO and HOS eventually worsened, though HOS did not function integrally throughout the country. In the area of Novi Travnik it was closer to the HVO, while in the Mostar area, there were increasingly tense relations between the HOS and the HVO. On 9 August Kraljević was killed in unclear circumstances at a police checkpoint in the village of Kruševo, along with eight of his staff members by HVO soldiers under the command of Mladen Naletilić. On 23 August 1992 HVO and HOS leaders in Herzegovina agreed to incorporate the HOS into the HVO. The remaining HOS forces were later recognised by the Sarajevo government as part of the ARBiH. The HOS forces in central Bosnia merged with the HVO in April 1993. Most of the Bosniaks that were members of the HOS joined the Muslim Armed Forces (MOS).

== Symbols ==
The HOS had a black flag with its emblem in the centre: a circle of triple wattle containing a chequered shield (with white first square) over a four-sided blue-and-white triple-wattle symbol; above, the inscription "HOS"; below, "HSP, Za dom spremni", which was the Ustaše salute during WW2 in the Independent State of Croatia. HOS symbols have become a contentious issue in recent years as the popularity of its flag with the Za Dom Spremni slogan has grown with right-wing fans at sporting events and HOS veterans continue to use HOS and Ustaše insignia at public events.

== Units ==
Name	Symbol	Headquarters	Commander
1st Battalion Ivan Vitez Brdar (1. bojna Ivan Vitez Brdar)		Livno, Bosnia and Herzegovina	Mate Šukan
2nd Battalion Stojan Vujnović "The Serb" (2. bojna Stojan Vujnović Srbin)		Domaljevac, Bosnia and Herzegovina	Stojan Vujnović
4th HOS Battalion (4. bojna HOS-a)			
6th Battalion Marijan Baotić (6. bojna Marijan Baotić)		Vinkovci, Croatia	Ivica Zupković Ivan Zoraja
9th Battalion Rafael Vitez Boban (9. bojna Rafael vitez Boban)		Split, Croatia	Jozo Radanović Marko Skejo
1st Company Ante Paradžik (1. satnija Ante Paradžik)		Jasenovac, Croatia	Miroslav Martinovski
Vukovar HOS Company (Vukovarska satnija HOS-a)		Vukovar, Croatia	Robert Šilić
13th Battalion Jure Vitez Francetić (13. bojna Jure vitez Francetić)		Tomislavgrad, Bosnia and Herzegovina	Ivan Mamić
The Knights (Vitezovi)		Vitez, Bosnia and Herzegovina	Darko Kraljevic
101st Battalion To Drina (101. bojna Do Drine)		Sarajevo, Bosnia and Herzegovina	Mate Matasin
19th Battalion Vitez Jure Francetić (19. bojna Vitez Jure Francetić)		Gospić, Croatia	Valentin Rajković
Black Wolves (Crni vukovi)		Kalesija, Bosnia and Herzegovina	Refik Fiko Brđanović
Marked Ones (Žigosani)		Novi Travnik, Bosnia and Herzegovina	
Hunter Company (Satnija Lovci)		Ljubuški, Bosnia and Herzegovina	
Independent Security Company (Samostalna satnija osiguranja)		Zagreb, Croatia	
Mostar HOS Battalion (Mostarska bojna HOS-a)		Mostar, Bosnia and Herzegovina	
Ljubuški HOS Company (Ljubuška satnija HOS-a)		Ljubuški, Bosnia and Herzegovina	
Zenica HOS Company (Zenička satnija HOS-a)		Zenica, Bosnia and Herzegovina	
Tuzla HOS Company (Tuzlanska satnija HOS-a)		Tuzla, Bosnia and Herzegovina	
Čapljina HOS Company (Čapljinska satnija HOS-a)		Čapljina, Bosnia and Herzegovina	

== Gallery ==
Standard HOS patch

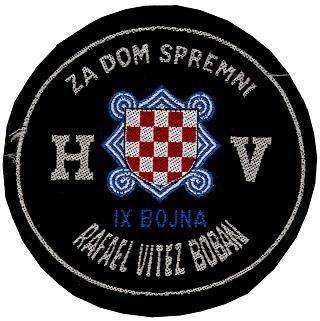
Patch of HOS 9th battalion, 114th brigade

Croatian flag used by HOS soldiers

Patch of HOS 9th battalion, 4th brigade

Rare HOS patch from Herzegovina

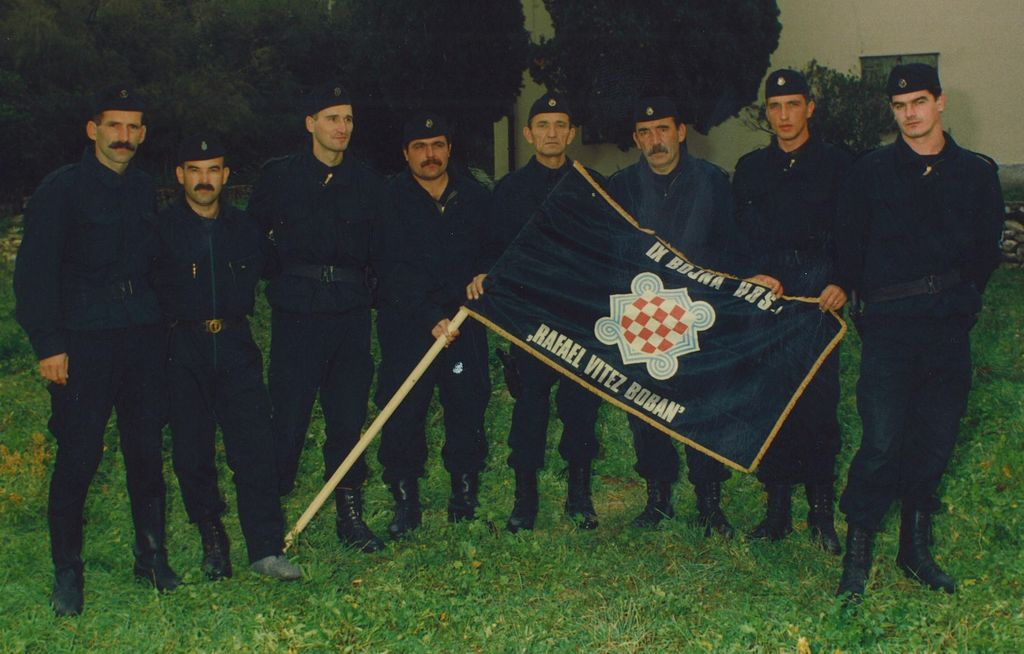
HOS soldiers after the war

HOS-a patch from Prozor-Rama

HOS patch for Muslims

Patch used by some HOS soldiers in Bosnia and Herzegovina

== See also ==
- Blaž Kraljević
- Croatian Party of Rights

== Literature ==
- Hewitt, Dawn M. (1998). From Ottawa to Sarajevo: Canadian Peacekeepers in the Balkans. Kingston, Ontario: Centre for International Relations, Queen's University. ISBN 978-0-88911-788-4.
- Marijan, Davor (2004). "Expert Opinion: On the War Connections of Croatia and Bosnia and Herzegovina (1991–1995)". Journal of Contemporary History. 36. Zagreb, Croatia: Croatian Institute of History: 249–289.
- Ramet, Sabrina P. (2006). The Three Yugoslavias: State-Building and Legitimation, 1918–2005. Bloomington: Indiana University Press. ISBN 978-0-253-34656-8.
- Shrader, Charles R. (2003). The Muslim-Croat Civil War in Central Bosnia: A Military History, 1992–1994. College Station, Texas: Texas A&M University Press. ISBN 978-1-58544-261-4.
- Veselinović, Velimir (2014). "Obnavljanje i djelovanje Hrvatske stranke prava, 1990-1992" [Renewal and political activism of the Croatian Party of Rights (HSP), 1990-1992]. Croatian Political Science Review. 51 (2). Zagreb, Croatia: Fakultet političkih znanosti Sveučilišta u Zagrebu: 55–87.
