= Dobroslav Paraga =

Croatian politician (born 1960)

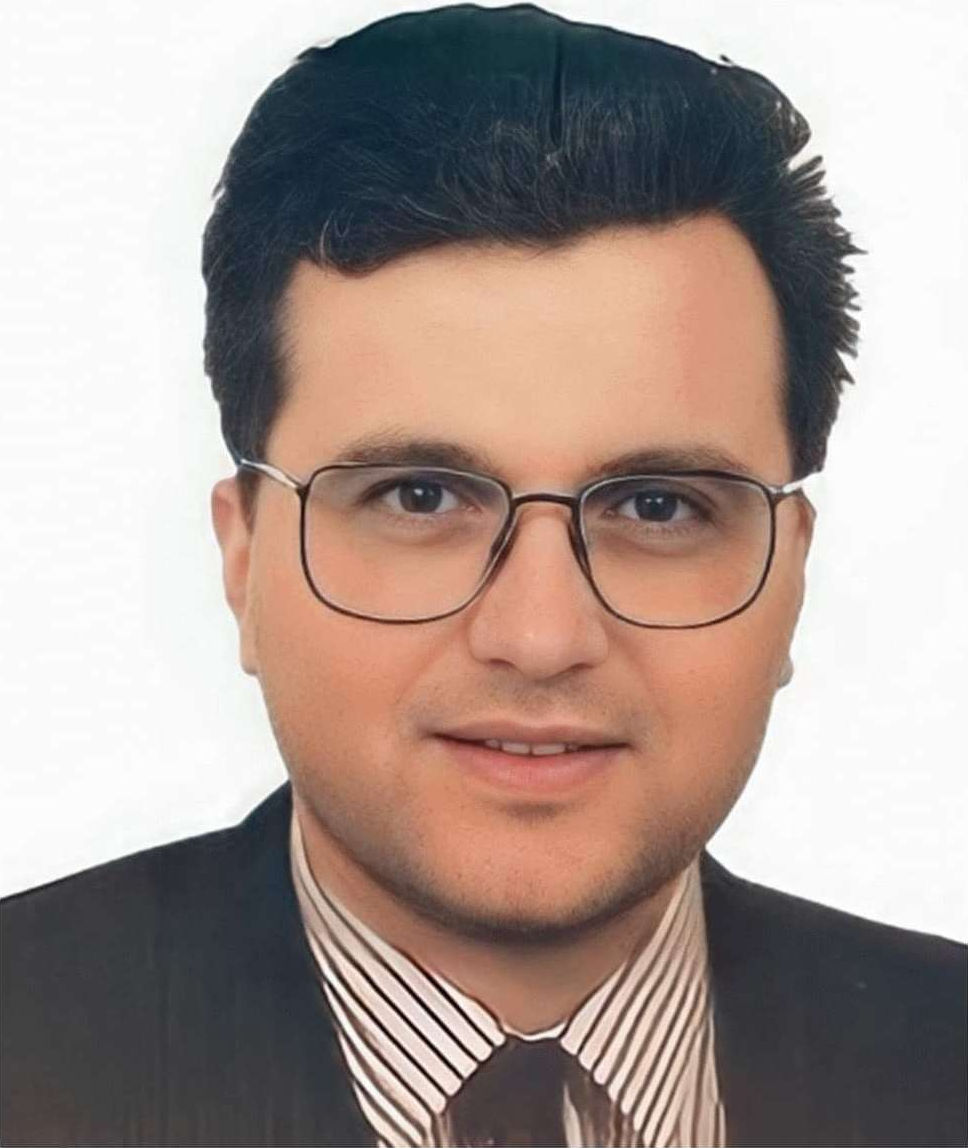
- Paraga during the 1990s

President of the Croatian Party of Rights 1861
- Incumbent
- Assumed office 11 September 1993
- Preceded by: Office established

Member of the Croatian Parliament
- In office 20 May 1990 – 7 November 1995

1st President of the Croatian Party of Rights
- In office 25 February 1991 – 11 September 1993
- Preceded by: Office established
- Succeeded by: Anto Đapić

Personal details
- Born: 9 December 1960 (age 65) Zagreb, PR Croatia, FPR Yugoslavia
- Party: Croatian Party of Rights 1861
- Other political affiliations: Croatian Party of Rights (1991–1993)
- Parent(s): Smiljan and Arna Paraga

Dobroslav Paraga (born 9 December 1960) is a Croatian far-right politician. He was the first president of the far-right Croatian Party of Rights, after the party was reestablished in 1991. In 1993 he founded the Croatian Party of Rights 1861 following a political split from Anto Đapić.

== Career ==
Paraga was born in 1960 in Zagreb. As a law student in 1980, he was arrested and spent time in prison for collecting signatures demanding the release of political prisoners.

Paraga founded the Croatian Party of Rights on 25 February 1990 with Ante Paradžik, viewing it as a continuation of the Party of Rights founded by Ante Starčević that operated in Austria-Hungary during the late nineteenth century. It has been described as neo-fascist.

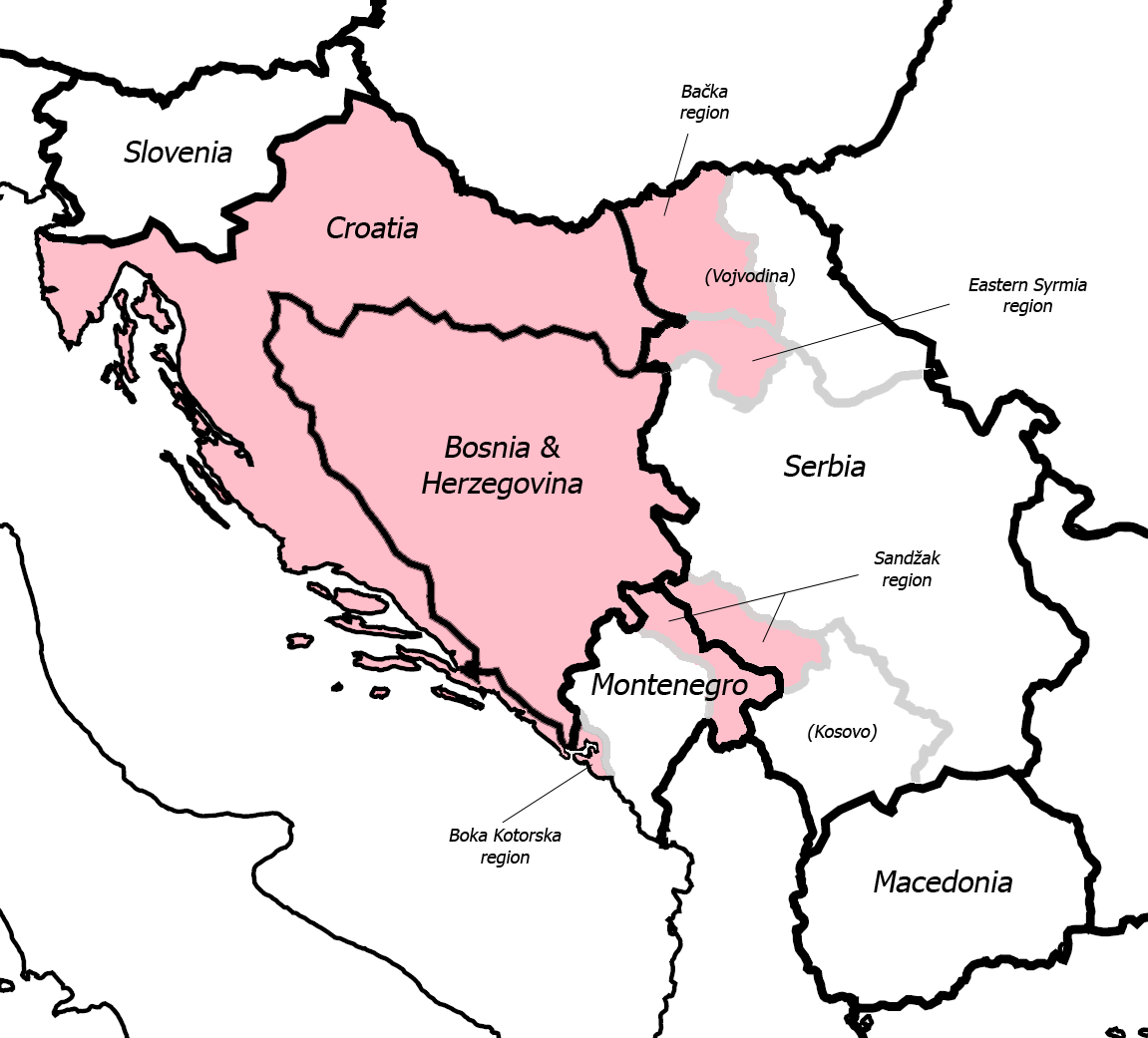
One of the visions of the borders of Greater Croatia as advocated by Paraga

His party formed its own militia, the Croatian Defence Forces (Croatian: Hrvatske obrambene snage; HOS) that was active in the Croatian War of Independence and in the Bosnian War. In an interview in 2000, Paraga stated his party was “for a Croatia to the Drina, and for a Bosnia and Herzegovina to the Adriatic”. This would also include parts of Serbia and Montenegro. For Paraga, the only possible Greater Croatia was one that was ethnically homogenous.

Paraga and the HSP had had hopes of becoming the major political factor before the 1992 presidential and parliamentary elections, but those hopes did not materialise. The HSP entered the Croatian Parliament, winning five seats but Paraga came fourth among presidential candidates, winning 5.4% of the vote. Another blow came in the form of high treason charges against Paraga and his associate Anto Đapić, who were stripped of their parliamentary immunity. Those charges were ultimately dropped, but the most serious blow for Paraga came when Đapić turned against him and took over the leadership of the HSP at the 1993 party convention in Kutina. Paraga accused Đapić of being in cahoots with Tuđman and tried to retrieve party leadership in court.

== Modern activity ==
Following the failure of the effort and second split with fellow party members, in 1995 Paraga founded a party called Croatian Party of Rights 1861, claiming to be the true descendant of the 19th century party in Austria-Hungary.
