= Party of Rights of Bosnia and Herzegovina 1861 =

Party of Rights of Bosnia and Herzegovina 1861 Bosanskohercegovačka stranka prava 1861
- President: Vlado Musa
- Founded: 1990
- Headquarters: Sarajevo, Bosnia and Herzegovina
- Ideology: Croatian nationalism Conservativism; Euroscepticism
- European affiliation: Croatian Party of Rights 1861

The Party of Rights of Bosnia and Herzegovina 1861 is political party in Bosnia and Herzegovina. It was founded at the end of 1990 as a pendant of Croatian Party of Rights 1861 from Croatia. The President of the party is Vlado Musa, and its headquarters are located in Sarajevo. They define themselves as a "multi-ethnic party for the citizens of Bosnia and Herzegovina, regardless of their ethnic origin and religion, who believe in a united Bosnia and Herzegovina".
