= Lisice, Ljubuški =

Lisice Лисице
- Village
- Location within Bosnia and Herzegovina
- Coordinates: 43°11′39″N 17°29′51″E
- Country: Bosnia and Herzegovina
- Entity: Federation of Bosnia and Herzegovina
- Canton: West Herzegovina
- Municipality: Ljubuški

Area
  - Total: 1.73 sq mi (4.48 km^{2})

Population (2013)
  - Total: 652
  - Density: 377/sq mi (146/km^{2})
- Time zone: UTC+1 (CET)
  - Summer (DST): UTC+2 (CEST)

Lisice (Serbian Cyrillic: Лисице) is a village in Bosnia and Herzegovina. According to the 1991 census, the village is located in the municipality of Ljubuški.

== Demographics ==
According to the 2013 census, its population was 652.

Ethnicity in 2013
Ethnicity	Number	Percentage
Croats	648	99.4%
other/undeclared	4	0.6%
Total	652	100%
