= Ante Paradžik =

Croatian politician (1943–1991)

Vice-president of the Croatian Party of Rights
- In office 25 February 1990 – 21 September 1991
- President: Dobroslav Paraga

Leader of War Command of Croatian Defence Forces
- In office 25 June 1991 – 21 September 1991

Personal details
- Born: 10 February 1943 Ljubuški, Independent State of Croatia
- Died: 21 September 1991 (aged 48) Zagreb, Croatia
- Party: League of Communists of Croatia (1971) Croatian Party of Rights (1990–1991)

Ante Paradžik (10 February 1943 – 21 September 1991) was a Croatian right-wing politician and communist-era dissident. Paradžik was one of the founders of the Croatian Party of Rights.

== Early life ==
Paradžik was born in 1943 in Ljubuški. His father disappeared in 1945 as a member of the armed forces of the Independent State of Croatia. After finishing elementary and high school in Ljubuški, Paradžik enrolled at the Faculty of Law in Split, and later continued his law studies at the University of Zagreb. Hailing from a poor family, Paradžik occasionally worked as a manual laborer in the summer. He also volunteered in youth work actions, earning the title of udarnik three times.

In 1968 Paradžik was elected into committee of the Union of Students of Croatia (Croatian: Savez studenata Hrvatske, SSH) at the Faculty of Law in Zagreb, and in May 1971 he was elected SSH's president, shortly after joining the League of Communists of Croatia.

Paradžik studied social rights and worked pro bono, and he also advocated social justice. For 19 years he was without passport and deprived of human rights, after he participated in Croatian Spring in 1971. After Croatian Spring ended, he was imprisoned, and released after collapse of Socialist Republic of Croatia in 1990.

== 1990s activity ==
Paradžik was one of the restorers of Croatian Party of Rights on 25 February 1990. He was also elected vice-president of the party and leader of War Command of Croatian Defence Forces (HOS).

Ante Paradžik was very dangerous to the government of Franjo Tuđman as the leader of paramilitary Croatian Defence Forces, opposing every compromise with Serbian representatives in the conflict. He advocated Croatian statehood and independence, uniting what he saw as Croatian historical and ethnic lands: Croatia, Bosnia and Herzegovina and Syrmia.

At the founding meeting of Croatian Defense Forces, Dobroslav Paraga explained that the Croatian Party of Rights organized armed volunteer detachments whose fighters had already been fighting in the first line of fire in critical areas of Croatia. Paradžik accused the Croatian government of dividing Croatian lands in negotiations with Slobodan Milošević and added that their party (Croatian Party of Rights) would not recognize any partition of Bosnia and Herzegovina. At a meeting of leaders of Croatian Party of Rights with officials from Albania and Bulgaria, they adopted a charter about creation of an anti-hegemony coalition of movements and parties of Albanians, Bulgarians and Croats, with the goal to push Serbia within its pre-First Balkan War (1912) borders.

== Death ==
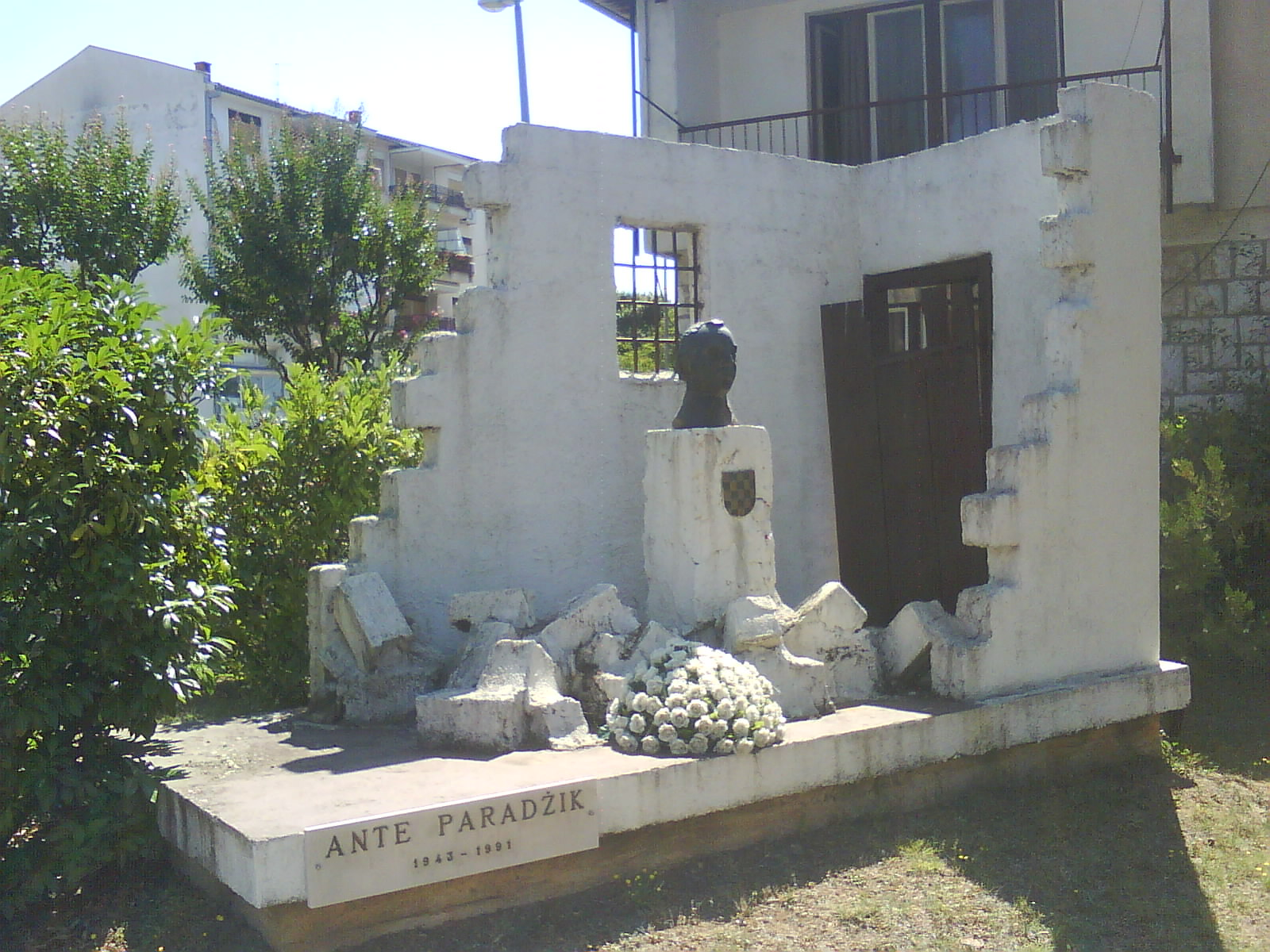
Monument of Ante Paradžik in Ljubuški

Days before Paradžik was assassinated, the Defence Minister of Croatia, Ivan Vekić, told Paraga and Paradžik to instruct Croatian Defence Forces to cease the blockade of the barracks of the Yugoslav People's Army, or face disarmament by the Ministry of Internal Affairs. Paradžik was assassinated in front of the building of Ministry of Internal Affairs of Croatia on 21 September 1991. After his assassination, Slobodan Milošević requested (at a peace conference held in The Hague in November 1991) that Franjo Tuđman disarm Croatian Defence Forces and soon afterwards Tuđman issued a command to disarm the Croatian Defence Forces and to ban the Croatian Party of Rights as well as the Serbian nationalist party Serb Democratic Party. Even though the Croatian Defence Forces had formally been disarmed, they continued to be active in the Croatian War of Independence. The last unit was dissolved on 5 April 1993 in central Bosnia.

Paradžik was married with three children. His best man was Dražen Budiša, Croatian liberal politician and participant in Croatian Spring. His son, Mislav committed suicide on 25 December 2014.

== Bibliography ==
- Lučić, Ivica (2016). "Političko-sigurnosne okolnosti pogibije Ante Paradžika" [The political and security circumstances of Ante Paradžik's death]. Časopis za suvremenu povijest (in Croatian). 48 (2). Zagreb: Croatian Institute of History: 355–388.
- Veselinović, Velimir (2015). "Politička djelatnost Ante Paradžika" [The political activities of Ante Paradžik]. Anali Hrvatskog politološkog društva (in Croatian). 12 (1). Zagreb: Croatian Political Science Association: 133–155. doi:10.20901/an.12.09.
