= Ivanovac =

Coordinates: 45°29′00″N 18°38′28″E

- Village (Selo)
- Interactive map of Ivanovac

Ivanovac (German: Johannesdorf) is a village near Antunovac, Osijek-Baranja County, Croatia. In the 2011 census, it had 1,522 inhabitants.

== History ==
The present day Ivanovac was founded in 1836 by the Danube Swabian Germans from Tolna County. In 1910, Ivanovac had 803 Germans, and it was one of only five settlements in the Osijek area where Germans formed an absolute ethnic majority. On 26 March 2022 at 14:39 the DVD Ivanovac received a call about a wildfire in the area of the Korođgrad hamlet. 10 hectares (25 acres) burned by the time it was put out at 15:50.
