= Antunovac, Osijek-Baranja County =

Antunovac
- Municipality
- Općina Antunovac; Municipality of Antunovac
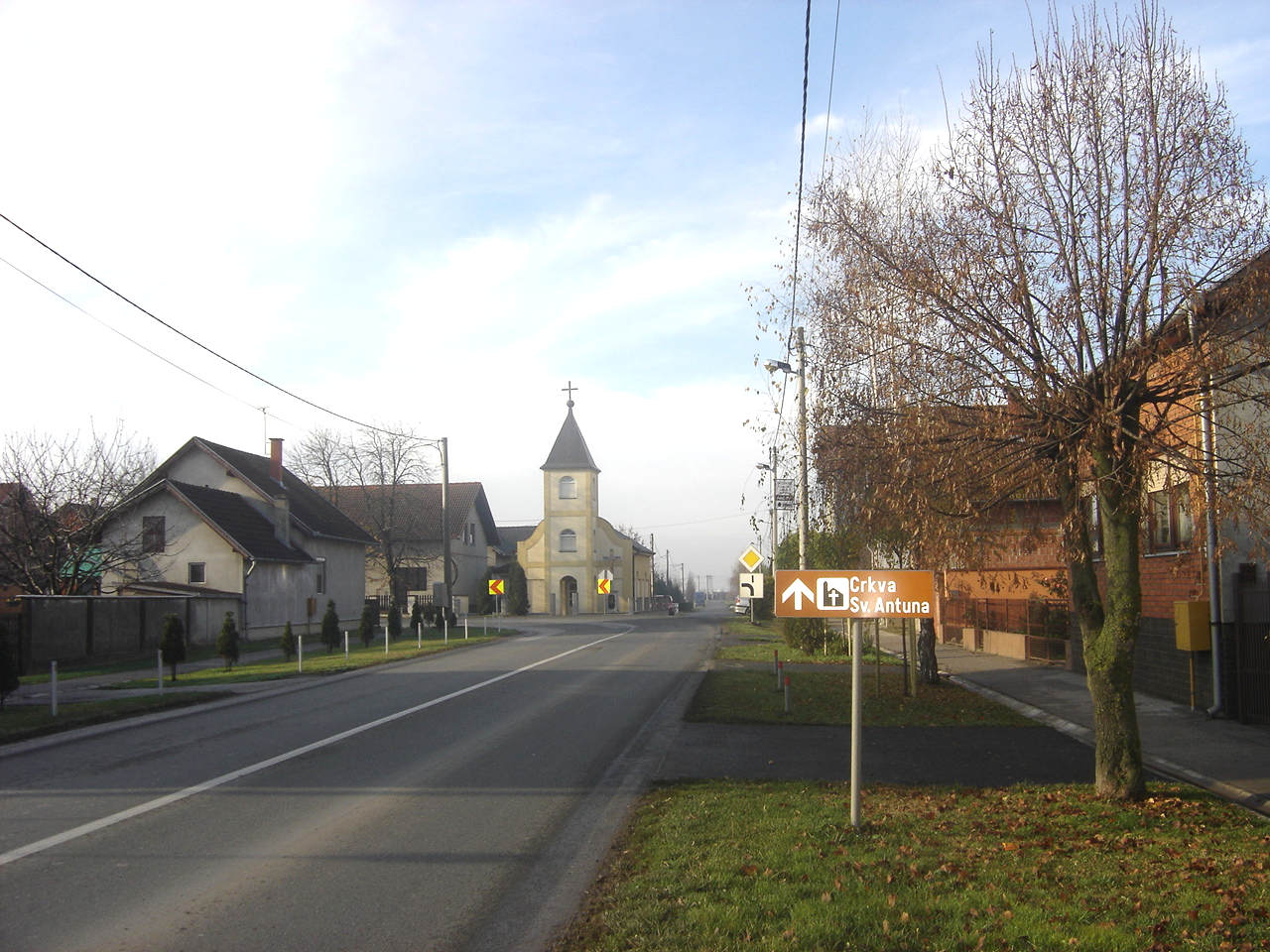
- Old church in Antunovac

- Flag Coat of arms

- Location of Antunovac in Croatia Antunovac (Croatia) Antunovac (Europe)
- Coordinates: 45.487°N 18.672°E
- Country: Croatia
- Region: Slavonia (Podunavlje)
- County: Osijek-Baranja County

Government
  - Mayor: Davor Tubanjski (HDZ)

Area
  - Municipality: 56.8 km^{2} (21.9 sq mi)
  - Urban: 37.7 km^{2} (14.6 sq mi)

Population (2021)
  - Municipality: 3,411
  - Density: 60.1/km^{2} (156/sq mi)
  - Urban: 2,036
  - Urban density: 54.0/km^{2} (140/sq mi)
- Time zone: UTC+1 (Central European Time)
- Website: opcina-antunovac.hr

Antunovac (Hungarian: Antalfalu; German: Antonsfeld) is a municipality in Osijek-Baranja County, Croatia. At the 2011 census, there were 3,703 inhabitants, 96% of them Croats. The municipality consists of two villages: Antunovac (2,181 inhabitants) and Ivanovac (1,522 inhabitants). Antunovac is an underdeveloped municipality which is statistically classified as part of the First Category Area of Special State Concern by the Government of Croatia.

== History ==
On 27 February 2026, Croatian war veteran Stjepan Boni was buried in Antunovac, 36 years after his death in Stari Seleš in the November of 1991 and nine days after his exhumation.
