= Ivan Vekić (politician) =

Croatian politician and lawyer

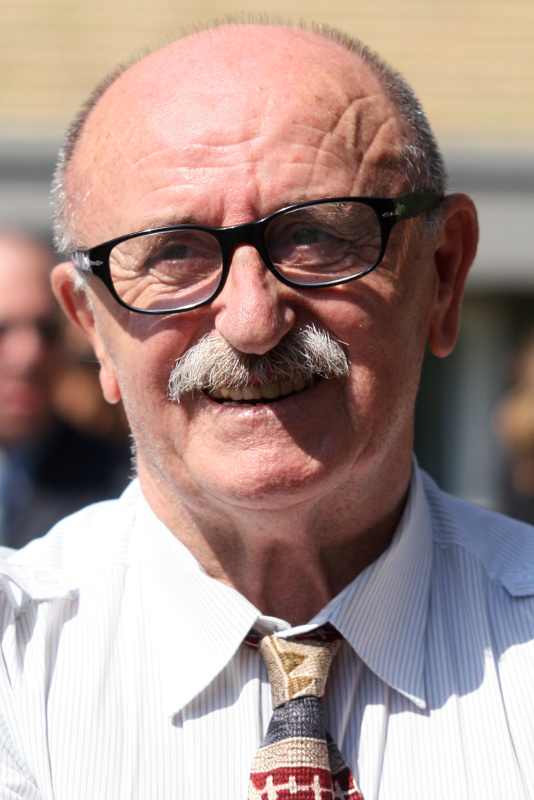
- Ivan Vekić in September 2011

Minister of the Interior
- In office 17 July 1991 – 15 April 1992
- President: Franjo Tuđman
- Prime Minister: Franjo Gregurić
- Preceded by: Onesin Cvitan
- Succeeded by: Ivan Jarnjak

Personal details
- Born: 18 October 1938 Poljica near Vrgorac, Kingdom of Yugoslavia
- Died: 17 December 2014 (aged 76) Osijek, Croatia
- Party: Hrvatska Straža
- Other political affiliations: Croatian Democratic Union (1989–2003); Only Croatia (2007)
- Profession: Lawyer
- Awards: Order of Ante Starčević

Military service
- Allegiance: Croatia
- Branch/service: Croatian Army
- Years of service: 1991–1995
- Rank: Colonel
- Commands: Croatian Police
- Battles/wars: Croatian War of Independence

Ivan Vekić (Croatian pronunciation: [ǐʋan ʋěːkit͡ɕ]; 18 October 1938 – 17 December 2014) was a Croatian politician and lawyer. He was one of the founders of the Croatian Democratic Union and served as the Croatian Minister of Interior during the Croatian War of Independence.

== Biography ==
Vekić was born in Poljica near Vrgorac in Kingdom of Yugoslavia on 18 October 1938.

During World War II and the occupation of Yugoslavia, his family was part of the Nazi-aligned Ustasha movement. He survived the Bleiburg repatriations in 1945, unlike his younger sister, Smiljana.

He was a member of Matica hrvatska and was one of the founders of the Croatian Democratic Union in 1989. In 1990 he entered the Croatian Parliament. He served as the Minister of Interior from 31 July 1991 until 15 April 1992. During the Croatian War of Independence he had a rank of Colonel. He was decorated with the Order of Ante Starčević for contribution to the maintenance and development of the Croatian statehood idea, establishment and construction of the sovereign Croatian state, while he refused to accept 5 decorations which were awarded to him by President Franjo Tuđman.

Vekić is a critic of post-war policy of Croatian Democratic Union. He entered a conflict with the party's new leaders, Ivo Sanader and Vladimir Šeks. In 2003, after publishing Steps in History - Memories and Events (Croatian: Koraci u povijesti – sjećanja i događaji), where he criticized Šeks, he was expelled from the party.

During the parliamentary election in 2007, he was a candidate of Only Croatia – Movement for Croatia for a seat in the Parliament.

In May 2011, after a series of adverse events in Croatia, he reshaped his existing civic association "Croatian Guard" into a nationalist political party called the Croatian Guard National Party. He is the President of the party, and they advocate armed training in high schools and capital punishment.

In September 2011 he was accused for war crimes by Serbia, along with Vladimir Šeks, Branimir Glavaš, Tomislav Merčep and 40 other Croatian soldiers involved in the Battle of Vukovar. He is charged with killing of 13 civilians and 6 unidentified persons.

In October 2011 he entered into a coalition with the Croatian Party of Rights. This was a result of call for unity of right-wing parties made by Daniel Srb, president of the Croatian Party of Rights. Vekić was the top candidate on this coalition's list in the 4th electoral district in the 2011 Croatian parliamentary election. The list won 4.69% of the vote and failed to enter parliament.
