= Croatian nationalism =

Political ideology

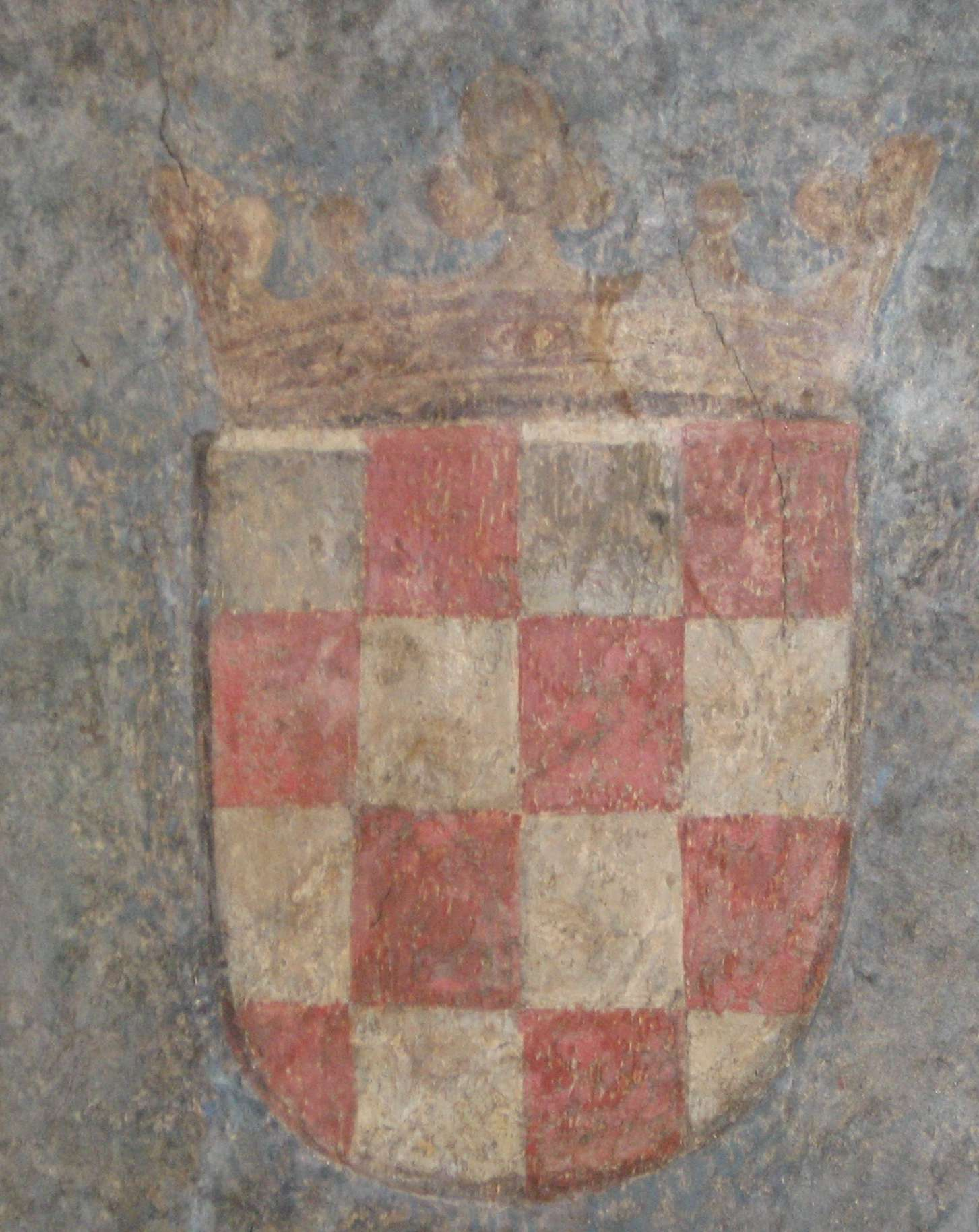
An early version of the Croatian šahovnica as the coat of arms of the Kingdom of Croatia in 1495

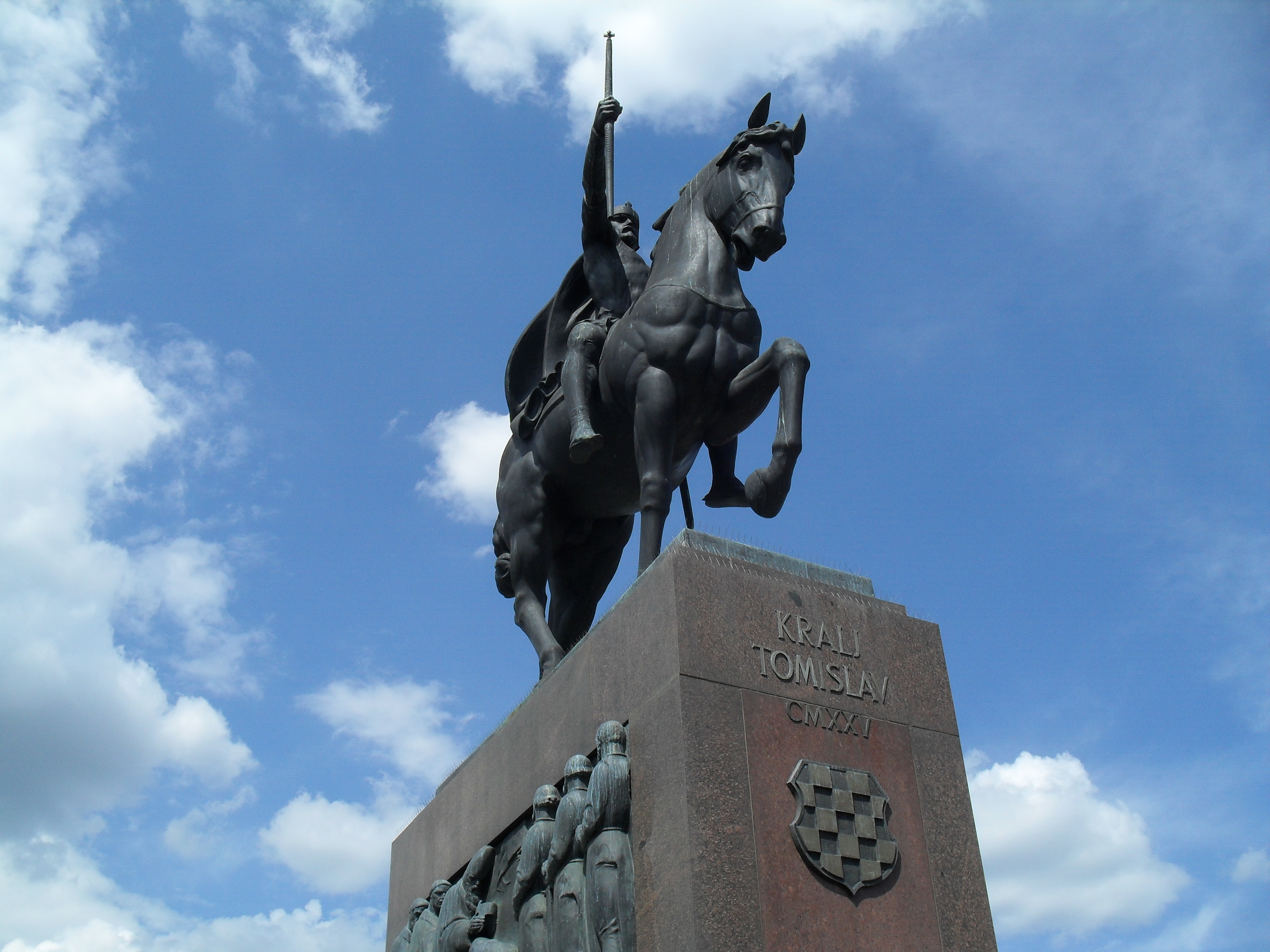
Statue in Zagreb of King Tomislav, the first Croatian king (r. c. 925 – 928)

Croatian nationalism is nationalism that asserts the nationality of Croats and promotes the cultural unity of Croats.

Modern Croatian nationalism first arose in the 19th century after Budapest exerted increasing pressure for Magyarization of Croats; the movement started to grow especially after the April Laws of 1848 which ignored Croatian autonomy within the Hungarian Kingdom. Croatian nationalism was based on two main ideas: a historical right to statehood based on a continuity with the medieval Croatian state and an identity associated with other Slavs - especially Southern Slavs.

A Croatian revival started with the Illyrian movement (c. 1835 onward), which founded the Matica hrvatska organisation in 1842 and promoted "Illyrian" language. Illyrianism spawned two political movements: the Party of Rights (founded in 1861 and named after the concept of the Croatian state right (pravaštvo); led by Ante Starčević), and Yugoslavism (the term means "South-Slav-ism") under Josip Juraj Strossmayer (1815-1905). Both Starčević and Strossmayer were largely limited in their influence to the Croatian intelligentsia.

Advocacy in favour of Yugoslavism as a means to achieve the unification of Croatian lands in opposition to their division under Austria-Hungary began with Strossmayer advocating this as being achievable within a federalized Yugoslav monarchy.

After the foundation of Yugoslavia in 1918, a highly centralized state was established under the St. Vitus Day Constitution of 1921 in accordance with Serbian nationalist desires to ensure the unity of the Serbs; this caused resentment amongst Croats and other peoples in Yugoslavia. Dalmatian Croat and the principal World War I-era Yugoslavist leader Ante Trumbić denounced the St. Vitus Day Constitution for establishing a Serb hegemony in Yugoslavia - contrary to the interests of Croats and other peoples in Yugoslavia. Croatian nationalists opposed the centralized state, with moderate nationalists demanding an autonomous Croatia within Yugoslavia. Croatian nationalism became a mass movement in the Kingdom of Yugoslavia through Stjepan Radić's Croatian Peasant Party. The demand by moderate Croatian nationalists for an autonomous Croatia - the Banovina of Croatia - within Yugoslavia was accepted by the Yugoslav government in the Cvetković–Maček Agreement of August 1939. This agreement angered Serbian nationalists, who opposed it on the grounds that it weakened the unity of Serbdom in Yugoslavia; they asserted the importance of Serbian unity to Yugoslavia with the slogan "Strong Serbdom, Strong Yugoslavia". The agreement also angered Bosniaks (then known as "Yugoslav Muslims"), including the Yugoslav Muslim Organization (JMO), that denounced the agreement's partition of Bosnia and Herzegovina.

A violent sectarian Croatian nationalism also developed prior to World War II within Ante Pavelić's Ustaše movement (founded in 1929), which collaborated with Nazi Germany and Fascist Italy in its government of the "Independent State of Croatia" (1941–1945) during World War II. Under post-war communist rule in Yugoslavia, dominated by the part-Croat Tito (in power 1944–1980), Croatian nationalism became largely dormant, except for the Croatian Spring of 1967 to 1971, until the breakup of Yugoslavia in 1991-1992 and the Croatian War of Independence of 1991 to 1995.

In its more extreme form, Croatian nationalism is marked by the desire for the establishment of a Greater Croatian state, by the idealization of peasant and of patriarchal values, as well as by anti-Serb sentiment.

== History ==
=== Austria-Hungary ===
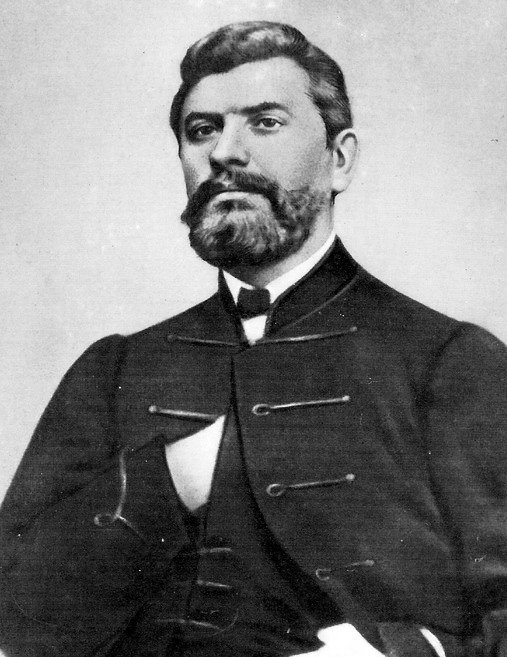
Ante Starčević, nicknamed Father of the Nation, considered to be father of Croatian nationalism, 1859

In the 19th century, opposition by Croats to Magyarization and desire for independence from Austria-Hungary led to the rise of Croatian nationalism. The Illyrian movement sought to awaken Croatian national consciousness and a standardize regional literary traditions which existed in a various dialects on a single standard language. Once the Croatian lands were culturally unified, the movement aimed at unifying the rest of the South Slavs under the resurrected Illyrian name. Illyrianists during the Revolutions of 1848 sought to achieve political autonomy of Croatia within a federalized Habsburg monarchy. Ante Starčević founded the Party of Rights in Croatia in 1861 that argued that legally, Croatia's right of statehood had never been abrogated by the Habsburg monarchy and thus Croatia was legally entitled to be an independent state. Starčević regarded Croatia to include not only present-day Croatia but also what is now Bosnia and Herzegovina, Slovenia (Duchy of Carinthia, Carniola, Styria) and parts of what is today Serbia (Sanjak of Novi Pazar, Syrmia)—all people in this Greater Croatia whether Catholic, Muslim, or Orthodox were defined as Croats.

During the 19th to mid-20th century Croatian nationalists competed with the increasingly Pan-Slavic Illyrian movement and Yugoslavists over the identity of Croats. The founder of Yugoslavism, Croatian Bishop Josip Juraj Strossmayer advocated the unification of Croat lands into a Yugoslav monarchical federal state alongside other Yugoslavs. However, in spite of both Starčević's and Strossmayer's competing visions of identity, neither of their views had much influence beyond Croatia's intelligentsia.

=== Kingdom of Yugoslavia ===
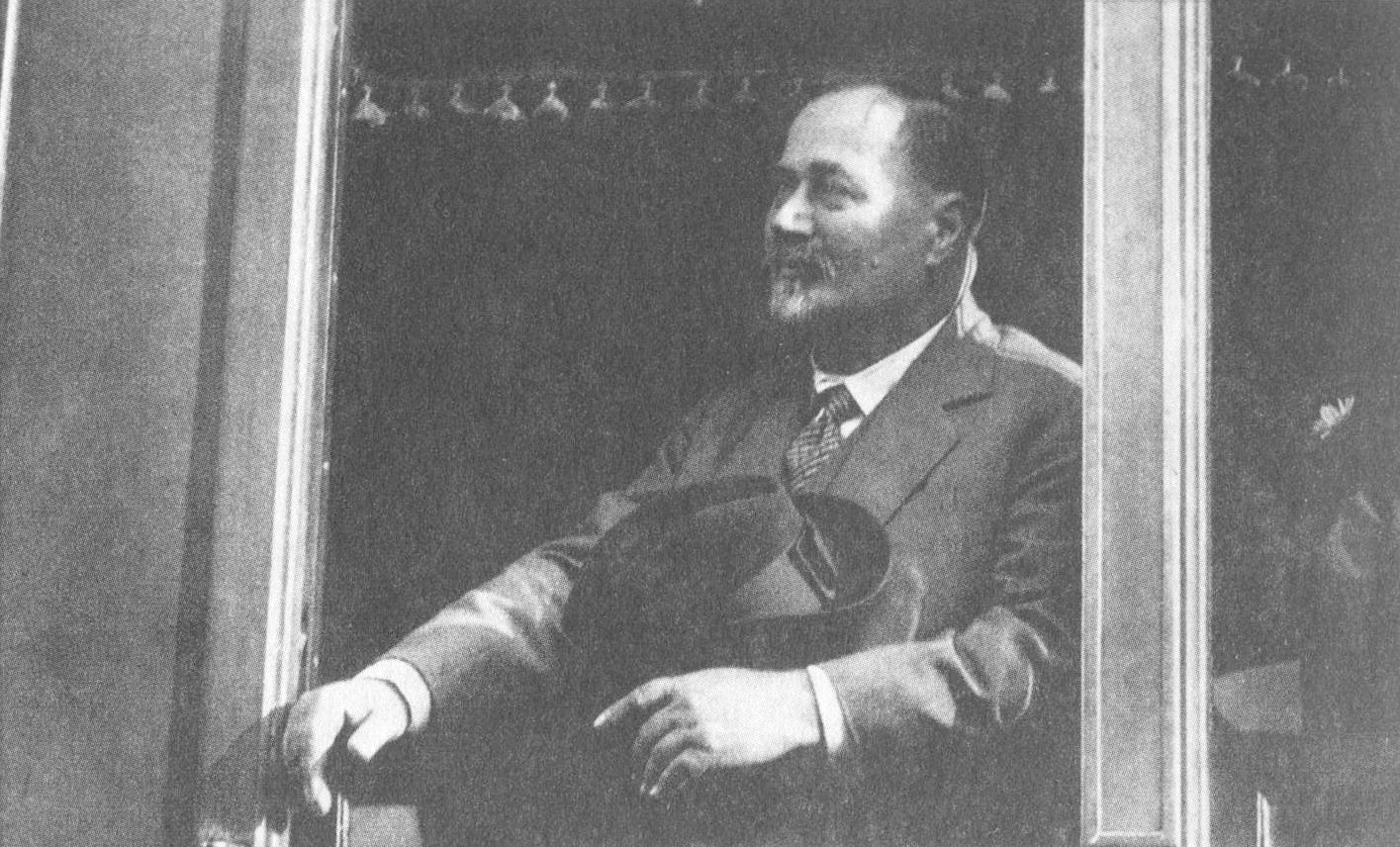
Stjepan Radić, 1928, a leader of Croatian peasantry class and ideology

Croatian nationalism became a mass movement under the leadership of Stjepan Radić, leader of the Croatian People's Peasant Party after 1918 upon the creation of Yugoslavia. Radić opposed Yugoslav unification, as he feared the loss of Croats' national rights in a highly centralized stated dominated by the numerically larger Serbs. The assassination of Radić in 1928 provoked and angered Croatian nationalists with the centralized Yugoslav state, and from 1928 to 1939, Croatian nationalism was defined as pursuing either some form of autonomy or independence from Belgrade. In 1939, a compromise between the Yugoslav government and the autonomist Croatian Peasant Party led by Vladko Maček was made with the creation of an autonomous Croatia within Yugoslavia known called the Banovina of Croatia.

=== Independent State of Croatia ===
Croatian nationalism reached an extreme point in its development during World War II, when the Croatian fascist Ustaše movement governed the Independent State of Croatia (NDH) after the invasion of Yugoslavia by the Axis Powers and the creation of the NDH at the behest of Fascist Italy and Nazi Germany as an Italo-German client state.

The clerical fascist Ustaše espoused a violent ultranationalist and ethnocratic ideology rooted in Croatian ethnic supremacy and Croatian irredentism. The ideology was characterized by intense anti-Serbism, antisemitism, and antiziganism, combined with a fascist embrace of Aryan racial theories that sought to purify the nation through genocide and forced assimilation. According to Ustaše officials, the creation of an ethnically pure Greater Croatian state would ensure the safety of the Croats from the Serbs.

The Ustaše committed genocide against Serbs, Jews and Roma, and persecuted political opponents, including the communist Yugoslav Partisans and Chetniks who fought against them. It is estimated that between 320,000 and 340,000 Serbs were killed in the NDH by the Ustaše and their Axis allies. Around 29–31,000 Jews, or 79% of their pre-war population in the NDH, were exterminated during the Holocaust, mostly by the Ustaše. The Ustaše also murdered nearly the entire Roma population of around 25,000.

=== Communist Yugoslavia ===
After the defeat of the Axis Powers in 1945 and the rise of communist Josip Broz Tito as leader of a new communist-led Yugoslavia, Croatian nationalism along with other nationalisms were suppressed by state authorities. During the communist era, some Croatian communists were labeled as Croatian nationalists, respectively Ivan Krajačić and Andrija Hebrang. Hebrang was accused by Serbian newspapers that he had influenced Tito to act against Serbian interests, in reality Tito and Hebrang were political rivals, since Hebrang advocated Croatian interests at the federal level and was one of the major Yugoslav Partisan leaders. Hebrang also advocated change of Croatian borders, since, according to him, Croatian boundaries were clipped by Milovan Đilas' commission. He also argued against unfair exchange rates imposed on Croatia after 1945 and condemning show trials against people labeled as collaborationists. Hebrang was not a serious threat to Serbian interests, since he was demoted several times and in 1948 he was put under house arrest.

Croatian nationalism did not disappear but remained dormant until the late 1960s to early 1970s with the outbreak of the Croatian Spring movement calling for a decentralized Yugoslavia and greater autonomy for Croatia and the other republics from federal government control. These demands were effectively implemented by Tito's regime. Croatian communists started to indicate on Serbian dominance in commanding party posts, posts in the army, police and secret police. However, main subject was the perceived subordinate status of standard Croatian, at that time regarded as a Western variety of Serbo-Croatian. In 1967 Croatian Writers' Association called for designation of Croatian as a distinct language both for educational and publishing purposes. Because of such demands Tito gave an order to purge reformers in 1971 and 1972. Some 1,600 Croatian communists were ejected from the Communist Party or arrested.

Such measures stopped the rise of nationalism in Yugoslavia, but Croatian nationalism continued to grow among Croat diaspora in South America, Australia, North America and Europe. Croatian political emigration was well-financed and often closely co-ordinated. Those groups were anti-communist since they originate from political emigrants who left Yugoslavia back in 1945.

Croatian nationalism revived in both radical, independentist, and extremist forms in the late 1980s in response to the perceived threat of the Serbian nationalist agenda of Slobodan Milošević who sought a strongly centralized Yugoslavia. Croatia declared independence from Yugoslavia in 1991 leading to the Croatian War from 1991 to 1995.

=== Modern Croatia and Bosnia and Herzegovina ===
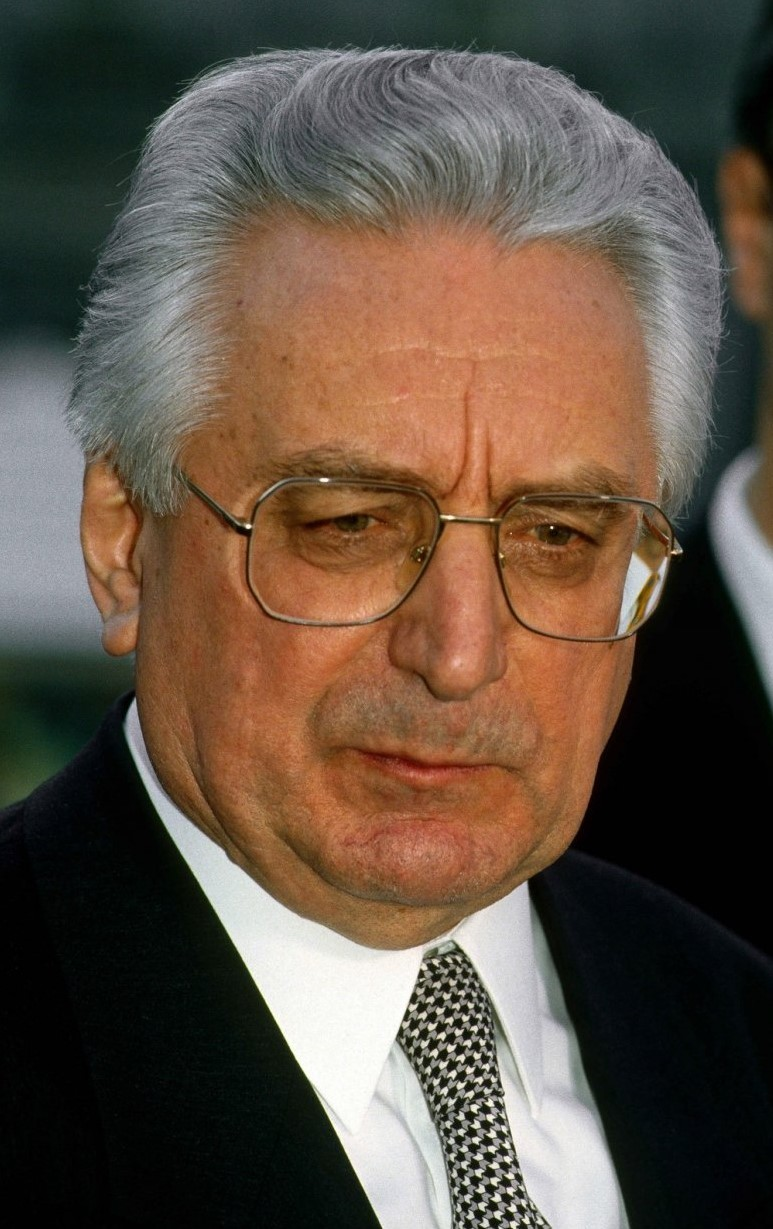
Franjo Tuđman, modern Croatia's first president, 1995

Beginning in the 1980s, the Croatian nationalist movement was led by former communist general and historian Franjo Tuđman. Tuđman was, at first, a prominent communist, but in the 1960s he began to embrace nationalism. He soon earned the favour of the Croat diaspora, helping him to raise millions of dollars toward the goal of establishing an independent Croatia. Tuđman gathered MASPOK intellectuals and sympathisers from among diaspora Croats and founded the Croatian Democratic Union (HDZ) in 1989. In 1990, Tuđman's HDZ won the first democratic elections in the Socialist Republic of Croatia. In 1991, war erupted in Croatia and the following year, the Bosnian War broke out.

The Croatian ruling elite helped the Bosnian HDZ to rise to power. The first leaders of the Bosnian HDZ opposed Tuđman's idea of division of Bosnia and Herzegovina between Croatia and Serbia; in response, Mate Boban was installed as leader of the HDZ. He founded the Croatian Republic of Herzeg-Bosnia with the goal to merge it with Croatia at the end of the war. Boban's project crashed in 1994 with the creation of the Federation of Bosnia and Herzegovina.

== Political parties ==
=== Current ===
- Croatian Democratic Union of Bosnia and Herzegovina (1990–present)
- Croatian Party of Rights (1990–present)
- Party of Rights of Bosnia and Herzegovina 1861 (1990–present)
- Croatian Pure Party of Rights (1992–present)
- Croatian Peasant Party of Bosnia and Herzegovina (1993–present)
- Croatian Party of Rights 1861 (1995–present)
- Croatian Party of Rights of Bosnia and Herzegovina (2004–present)
- Party of Croatian Right (2004–present)
- Authentic Croatian Party of Rights (2005–present)
- Croatian Democratic Union 1990 (2006–present)
- Only Croatia – Movement for Croatia (2007–present)
- Independents for Croatia (2017–present)
- Homeland Movement (2020–present)

=== Historical ===
- Croat People's Union (1910–2010)
- Croatian True Revival (2002–2011)
- Croatian Bloc (2002–2009)
- Croatian Coalition (2010–2011)

== See also ==
- Far-right politics in Croatia
- Foreign relations of Croatia
- Croatian socialism
- Dalmatian identity
- Istrian identity
- Greater Croatia
- Frankism

== Bibliography ==
- Cvetković, Dragan (2011). "Holokaust u Nezavisnoj Državi Hrvatskoj - numeričko određenje". Istorija 20. veka: Časopis Instituta za savremenu istoriju. 29 (1): 163–182. doi:10.29362/ist20veka.2011.1.cve.163-182.
- Arbanas, Martin (2016), Hrvatski nacionalizam i revolucija godine 1848, University of Pula. Faculty of Philosophy
- Bayram, Mürsel (2015). "Hırvat Milliyetçiliğinde Dil Unsurunun Rolü" [The Role of Language in Croatian Nationalism] (PDF). Uluslararası Hukuk ve Politika. ISSN 1305-5208. Archived from the original (PDF) on 2016-04-09.
- Blamires, Cyprian P. (2006). World Fascism: A Historical Encyclopedia. Santa Barbara, California: ABC-CLIO. ISBN 1-57607-940-6.
- Krestić, Vasilije Đ. (2014). "Croatian pretensions to Bosnia and Herzegovina since 1848" (PDF). Balcanica (45): 267–294. doi:10.2298/BALC1445267K.
- MacDonald, David Bruce (2002). Balkan holocausts?: Serbian and Croatian victim-centred propaganda and the war in Yugoslavia. Manchester: Manchester University Press. ISBN 0-7190-6466-X.
- Motyl, Alexander J. (2001). Encyclopedia of Nationalism, Volume II. Academic Press. ISBN 0-12-227230-7.
- Nizich, Ivana (1992). War Crimes in Bosnia-Herzegovina. Manchester: Helsinki Watch. ISBN 1-56432-083-9.
- Ramet, Sabrina P. (1999). The Radical Right in Central and Eastern Europe Since 1989. The Pennsylvania University Press. ISBN 0-271-01810-0.
- Tomasevich, Jozo (2001). War and Revolution in Yugoslavia, 1941–1945: Occupation and Collaboration. Stanford University Press. ISBN 978-0-8047-3615-2.
- Uzelac, Gordana (2006). The Development of the Croatian Nation: An Historical and Sociological Analysis. Lewiston, NY: Edwin Mellen Press.
