= Party of Croatian Right =

Political party in Bosnia and Herzegovina

Party of Croatian Right Stranka hrvatskog prava
- President: Ante Matić
- Founded: 19 December 2004
- Split from: Croatian Party of Rights of Bosnia and Herzegovina
- Headquarters: Livno, Bosnia and Herzegovina
- Ideology: Croatian nationalism Conservativism; Euroscepticism
- National affiliation: Croats

Website
- http://www.strankahrvatskogprava.tk/

Party of Croatian Right (Croatian: Stranka hrvatskog prava or SHP) is a conservative right-wing political party in Bosnia and Herzegovina.

Disatisfied with the "abandonment of the original rights idea by many other existing rights parties", the members of Party of Croatian Right, "who want to be loyal to the original rights teachings and goal", founded a new political party in Livno on 19 December 2004. Ante Matić became the first president of the party.

The party states that they are a national Croatian party that serves the interests of Croatian people and their spiritual and economic prosperity. Their goal is to promote the teachings of Ante Starčević and Eugen Kvaternik, founders of the original Party of Rights, as well as the social teachings of brothers Antun and Stjepan Radić, and other historical national leaders whose actions were founded on Starčević's teachings. They also encourage the advancement of the newest scientific achievements that will serve the nation as a whole and especially to Croats on "all of their historical territory".
