= Ivan Vekić (handballer) =

Croatian handball player (born 1998)

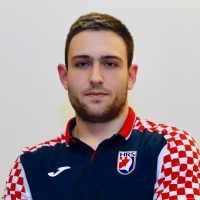

Personal information
- Nationality: Croate
- Born: 19 July 1998 (age 28) Metković, Croatia
- Height: 1.98 m (6 ft 6 in)

Sport
- Sport: Handball
- Position: Goalkeeper
- Current club: JS Cherbourg
- Number: 16

Senior clubs
- Years: Team
- 2017: RK Medveščak
- 2018–2020: RK Zagreb
- 2020 on loan: HRK Gorica
- 2020-2021: RK Poreč
- 2021-2023: HC Bordeaux Bruges Lormont
- 2023-2024: Handball Club Cournon d'Auvergne
- 2024-2026: JS Cherbourg
- 2026-: US Ivry Handball
National team
- Years: Team
- –: Croatia U17
- –: Croatia U19

Ivan Vekić (Croatian pronunciation: [ǐʋan ʋěːkit͡ɕ]) (born 19 July 1998) is a Croatian handball player who plays for US Ivry Handball in LNH Division 2/Proligue.

== Career ==
Vekić began his handball journey with his hometown club hometown club RK Metković, where he spent almost twelve years. In 2017, he transferred to RK Medveščak where he was on a loan from RK Zagreb. The following year, Vekić joined Zagreb, Croatia's premier team, participating in both the EHF Champions League and SEHA League.

In 2020, Vekić was loaned to HRK Gorica before signing with RK Poreč for the 2020–2021 season. His outstanding performance during this period earned him the title of Best Goalkeeper in the Croatian Premier League, boasting a 34.3% save rate with 208 saves across 18 matches.

Seeking international experience, Vekić moved to France in 2021 to play for Bordeaux Bruges Lormont Handball in the France N1 Elite. He helped the club earn promotion to the Proligue for the 2022–2023 season. The 2023–2024 season saw Vekić moving to Handball Club Cournon d'Auvergne. In 2024, he signed with JS Cherbourg and in the beginning of the 2025 he prolonged the contract for an additional year.

In 2026, Vekić signed a two-year contract with US Ivry Handball, joining the club ahead of the 2026–27 season.

== Honours ==
=== RK Poreč ===
- Croatian Premier League
  - Bronze medal (1): 2021

=== RK Zagreb ===
- Croatian Premier League
  - Champions (1): 2018

=== Bordeaux Bruges Lormont Handball ===
- France N1 Elite
  - Champions (1): 2022
- Proligue
  - Season (1): 2022/23

=== Handball Club Cournon d'Auvergne ===
- Proligue
  - Season (1): 2023/24

=== JS Cherbourg ===
- Proligue
  - Season (2): 2024/25, 2025/26

=== US Ivry Handball ===
- Proligue
  - Season (1): 2026/27

=== Individual ===
- Croatian Premier League - Best goalkeeper of the 2020/2021 season - 34,3% (208 saves in 18 matches)
