= Vladislavci =

- Municipality
- Flag Coat of arms

- Location in Croatia Vladislavci (Croatia)
- Coordinates: 45.46°N 18.57°E
- Country: Croatia
- Region: Slavonia
- County: Osijek-Baranja County

Government
  - Mayor: Marjan Tomas

Area
  - Municipality: 32.0 km^{2} (12.4 sq mi)
  - Urban: 8.9 km^{2} (3.4 sq mi)

Population (2021)
  - Municipality: 1,552
  - Density: 48.5/km^{2} (126/sq mi)
  - Urban: 919
  - Urban density: 100/km^{2} (270/sq mi)
- Time zone: UTC+1 (Central European Time)
- Website: opcina-vladislavci.hr

Vladislavci (Hungarian: Lacháza, Serbian Cyrillic: Владиславци) is a village and a municipality in Osijek-Baranja County, Croatia.

In the 2011 census, there were a total of 1,882 inhabitants, in the following settlements:

- Dopsin, population 482
- Hrastin, population 327
- Vladislavci, population 1,073

In the same census, 83% of the population were Croats, 9% Hungarians and 6% Serbs.

The Bobota Canal passes next to the village.

== Name ==
The name of the village in Croatian is plural.

== Politics ==
=== Minority councils ===
Directly elected minority councils and representatives are tasked with consulting the local or regional authorities, advocating for minority rights and interests, integration into public life and participation in the management of local affairs. At the 2023 Croatian national minorities councils and representatives elections Hungarians and Serbs of Croatia each fulfilled legal requirements to elect 10 members municipal minority councils of the Vladislavci Municipality but the elections for Serb council were not held due to the lack of candidates.

Preserving traditional minority place names and assigning street names to minority historical figures is legally mandated and carried out for both Hungarian and Serbian.
