= Daniel Srb =

Croatian politician (born 1964)

3rd President of the Croatian Party of Rights
- In office 7 November 2009 – 25 February 2017
- Preceded by: Anto Đapić
- Succeeded by: Karlo Starčević

Member of the Croatian Parliament
- In office 6 February 2009 – 22 December 2011
- Prime Minister: Ivo Sanader (2009); Jadranka Kosor
- Preceded by: Anto Đapić
- Constituency: IV electoral district

Personal details
- Born: 23 November 1964 (age 61) Osijek, SR Croatia, SFR Yugoslavia (modern Croatia)
- Party: Croatian Party of Rights
- Education: University of Zagreb
- Occupation: Politician
- Profession: Engineer
- Awards: Homeland War Memorial Medal

Military service
- Allegiance: Croatia
- Branch/service: Croatian Army
- Years of service: 1991–1995
- Battles/wars: Croatian War of Independence

Daniel Srb (pronounced [daniel sr̩b]; born 23 November 1964) is a Croatian right-wing politician and former president of the Croatian Party of Rights.

== Early life and education ==
Srb was born in Osijek on 23 November 1964. He graduated from the Faculty of Engineering and Shipbuilding at the University of Zagreb. He was a teacher at EMŠC in Osijek in 1991, later he taught at KBC Osijek.

== Political career ==
Since 1990, he has been an active politician. In 1992, he joined the Croatian Party of Rights.

He held different municipal positions in Osijek. He was a member of the Osijek Assembly for eight years. In 2005, he became the Deputy Prefect of the Osijek-Baranja County and from 2007-08 he was an employee at DS Consulting. He worked as the Assistant Director of Osijek's Clinical Hospital.

On 6 February 2009, he became a member of the Sabor to succeed Anto Đapić. He was the vice-president of the party until 7 November 2009, when he replaced Đapić.

Srb's main effort initially was to remove negative connotations associated with his party left by Đapić. Srb is known for his staunch euroscepticism, as his party was the only party represented in the Croatian Parliament that opposed membership in the European Union. He condemned the convictions of Ante Gotovina and Mladen Markač (which were later overturned) by the ICTY.

On 25 February 2017, at the Congress of the Croatian Party of Rights, Karlo Starčević was chosen as the new president of the party, replacing Srb.

=== Personal life ===
He is married and has three children. For seven times he was a champion of Croatia in rowing. He was the president of Rowing Club "Iktus" based in Osijek for ten years before stepping down in September 2013.
