= Divoš, Croatia =

Divoš
- Village (Selo)
- Location within Croatia
- Coordinates: 45°28′N 18°39′E
- Country: Croatia
- County: Osijek-Baranja County
- Municipality: Ernestinovo

Area
  - Total: 3.8 km^{2} (1.5 sq mi)

Population (2021)
  - Total: 54
  - Density: 14/km^{2} (37/sq mi)
- Demonym(s): Divošanin (♂) Divošanka (♀) (per grammatical gender)
- Time zone: UTC+1 (CET)
  - Summer (DST): UTC+2 (CEST)

Divoš (Serbian Cyrillic: Дивош) is a village in Croatia. It is connected by the D518 highway. Bobota Canal passes next to the village.
