= Croatian Party of Rights 1861 =

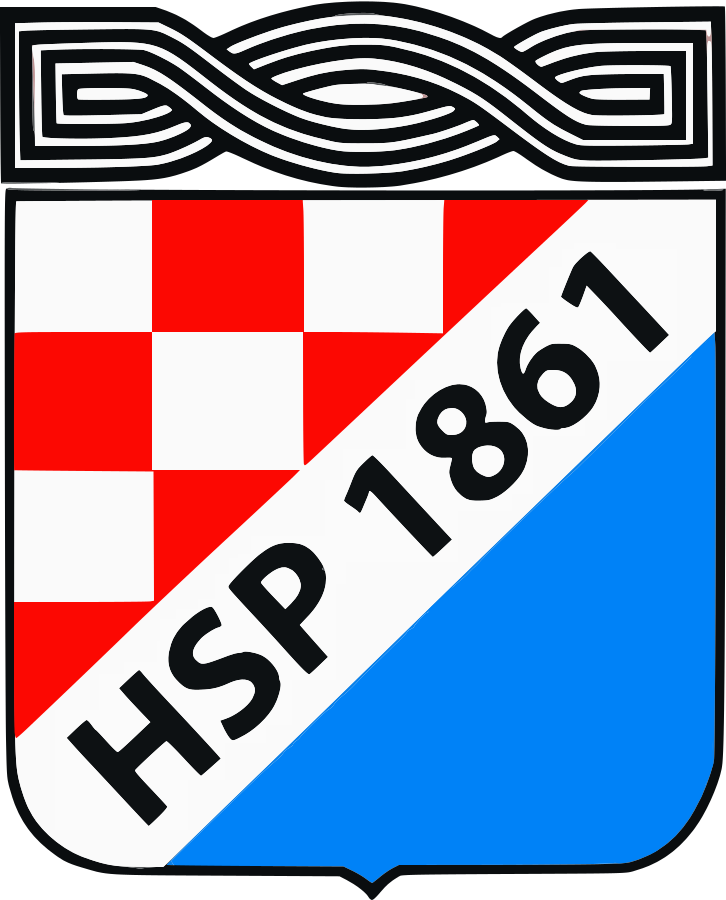
- Leader: Dobroslav Paraga
- Founded: 1995
- Split from: Croatian Party of Rights
- Headquarters: Zagreb
- Youth wing: Youth Club of the Croatian Party of Rights 1861
- Ideology: Croatian nationalism Anti-communism; Anti-Tuđmanism; Antiglobalism
- Political position: Far-right
- Colors: Black
- Slogan: Bog i Hrvati (God and Croats)

Website
- http://www.hsp1861.hr/

Croatian Party of Rights 1861 (Croatian: Hrvatska stranka prava 1861 or HSP 1861) is a far-right political party in Croatia.

It was founded in 1995 as a splinter party of the Croatian Party of Rights (HSP, itself founded in 1990) following the removal of Croatian nationalist Dobroslav Paraga from party leadership and Paraga's unsuccessful attempts to contest his removal in court. The "1861" in the party's name refers to the year of the foundation of the historic 19th century Party of Rights, which HSP 1861, along with several other modern day nationalist parties, claim lineage to.

The party considers Franjo Tuđman to be a traitor and a dictator - a rare position among rightists in Croatia.

== Legislative ==
Election	In coalition with	Votes won	Percentage	Seats won	Change	Government
1995 (October)	None	31,530	1.30%	0 / 151	Steady	Extraparliamentary
2000 (January)	None	29,416	1.01%	0 / 151	Steady	Extraparliamentary
2003 (November)	None	18,875	0.76%	0 / 151	Steady	Extraparliamentary
2016 (September)	None	888	0.05%	0 / 151	Steady	Extraparliamentary
