= Ernestinovo =

- Municipality
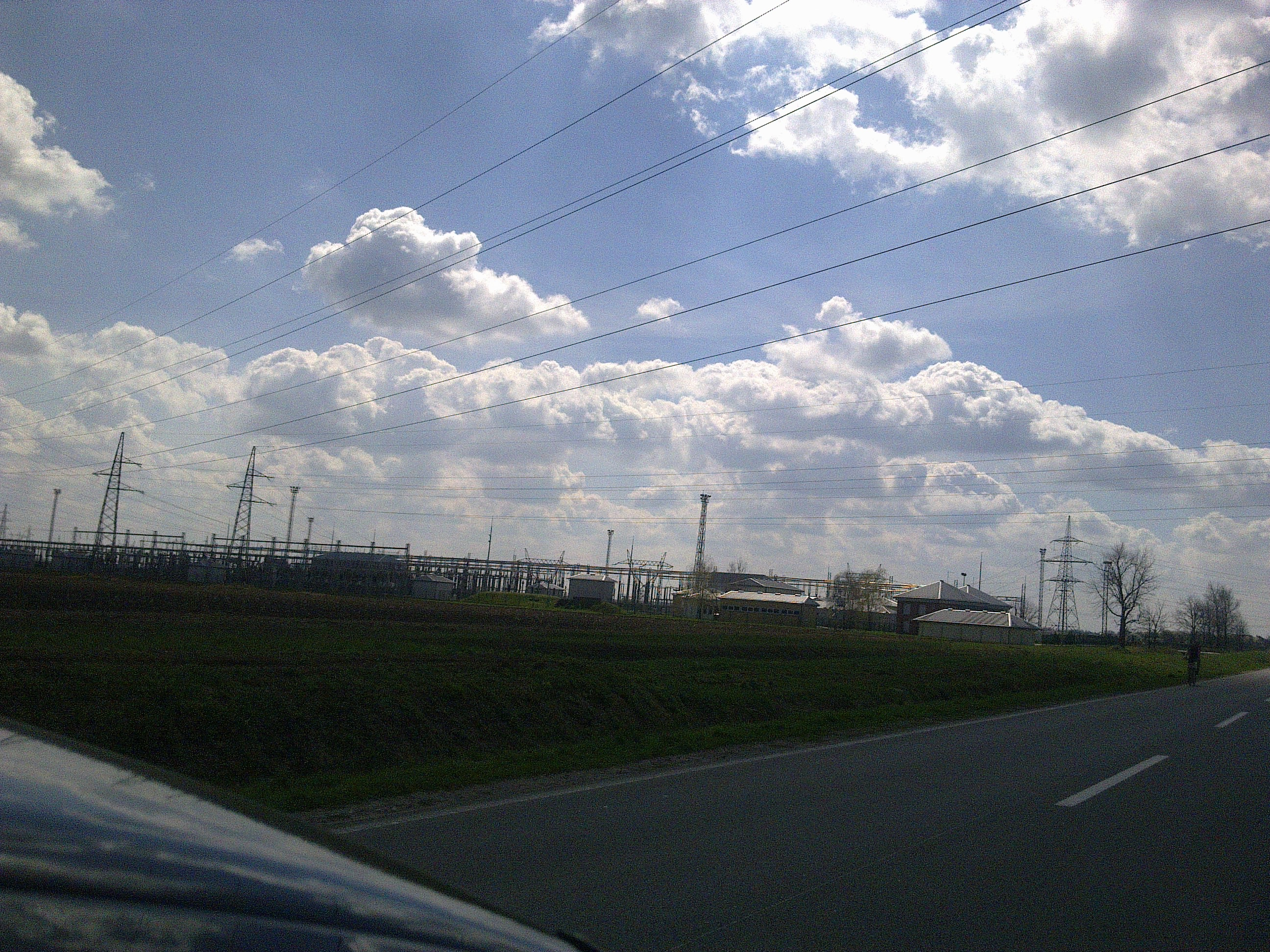
- Ernestinovo Power Station
- Interactive map of Ernestinovo
- Location of Ernestinovo in Croatia Ernestinovo (Croatia) Ernestinovo (Europe)
- Coordinates: 45.45°N 18.66°E
- Country: Croatia
- Region: Slavonia (Podunavlje)
- County: Osijek-Baranja County

Area
  - Municipality: 32.0 km^{2} (12.4 sq mi)
  - Urban: 10.9 km^{2} (4.2 sq mi)

Population (2021)
  - Municipality: 1,948
  - Density: 60.9/km^{2} (158/sq mi)
  - Urban: 996
  - Urban density: 91.4/km^{2} (237/sq mi)
- Time zone: UTC+1 (Central European Time)
- Website: ernestinovo.hr

Ernestinovo (Hungarian: Ernőháza, German: Ernestinenhof, Serbian Cyrillic: Ернестиново) is a village and a municipality in Osijek-Baranja County, Croatia.

The municipality of Ernestinovo was founded in 1884, before that Ernestinovo was part of the municipality of Čepin.

In the 2011 census, there were a total of 2,189 inhabitants, 78% of them Croats, 19% Hungarians, and 7% Serbs. The municipality consists of the settlements of Divoš (pop. 63), Ernestinovo (pop. 1,047), and Laslovo (pop. 1,079).

Ernestinovo also had some people of German descent, although most of the German inhabitants were expelled in 1944.

North of Ernestinovo lies the major HEP Substation TS Ernestinovo, which was originally built in 1977 as the first 400 kV station in Croatia. It is connected with long-distance power lines to TS Tumbri/Žerjavinec (Zagreb) and Pécs, Hungary. It had been destroyed in the Croatian War of Independence in 1991, but was fully repaired in 2003. Bobota Canal passes next to the village.

Ernestinovo is underdeveloped municipality which is statistically classified as the First Category Area of Special State Concern by the Government of Croatia.

== Politics ==
=== Minority councils ===
Although though the Government of the Republic of Croatia does not guarantee official Croatian-Hungarian bilingualism here, the statute of Ernestinovo itself does. Preserving traditional Hungarian place names and assigning street names to Hungarian historical figures is legally mandated and carried out.

Directly elected minority councils and representatives are tasked with consulting the local or regional authorities, advocating for minority rights and interests, integration into public life and participation in the management of local affairs. At the 2023 Croatian national minorities councils and representatives elections Hungarians and Serbs of Croatia each fulfilled legal requirements to elect 10 members municipal minority councils of the Ernestinovo Municipality but the elections for Serb council were not held due to the lack of candidates.
