= Vuka (river) =

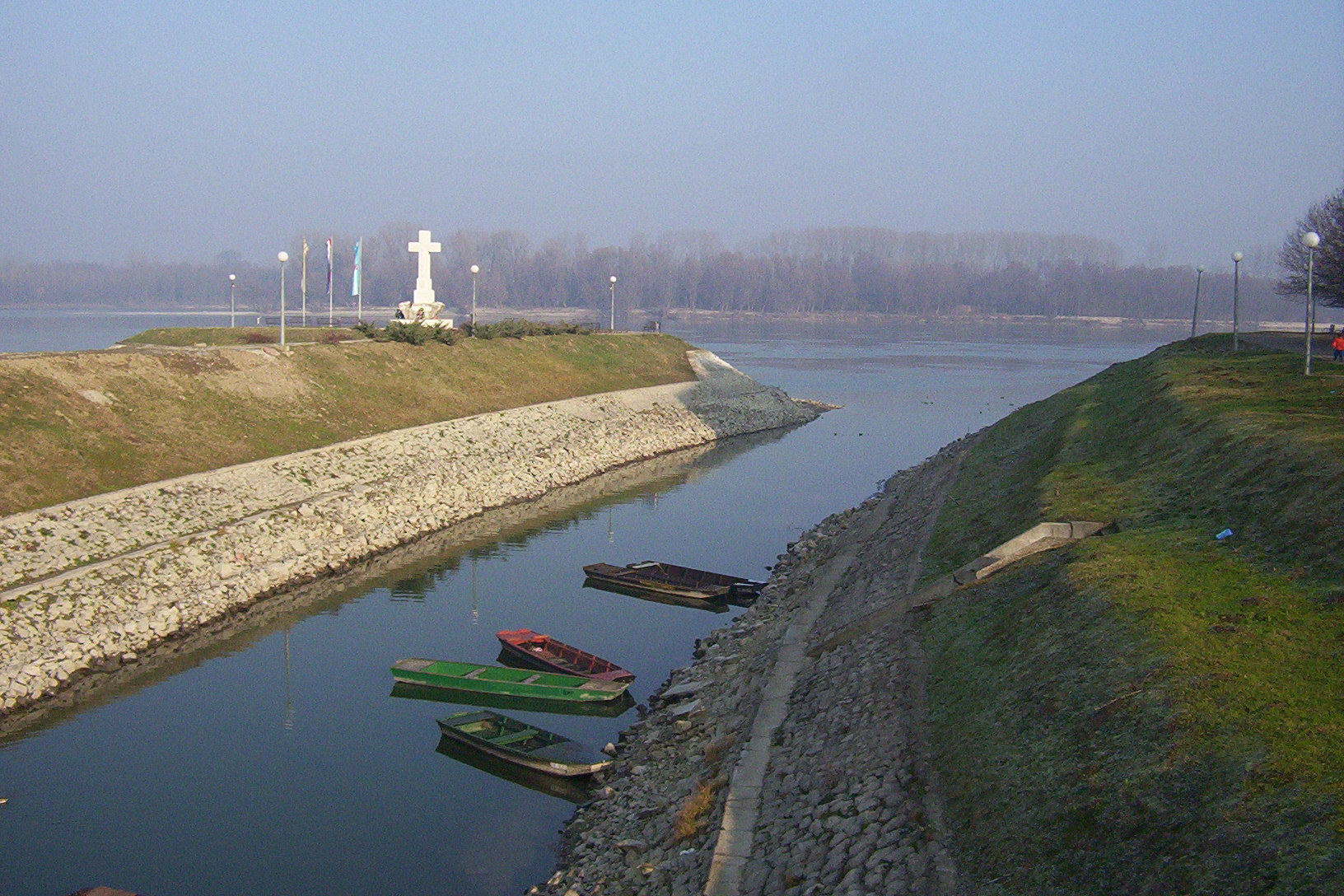
- Vukovar, place where Vuka empties into the Danube

Location
- Country: Croatia

Physical characteristics
- Mouth
  - location: Danube
  - coordinates: 45.3525°N 19.0052°E
- Length: 112 km (70 mi)
- Basin size: 644 km^{2} (249 sq mi)

Basin features
- Progression: Danube→ Black Sea

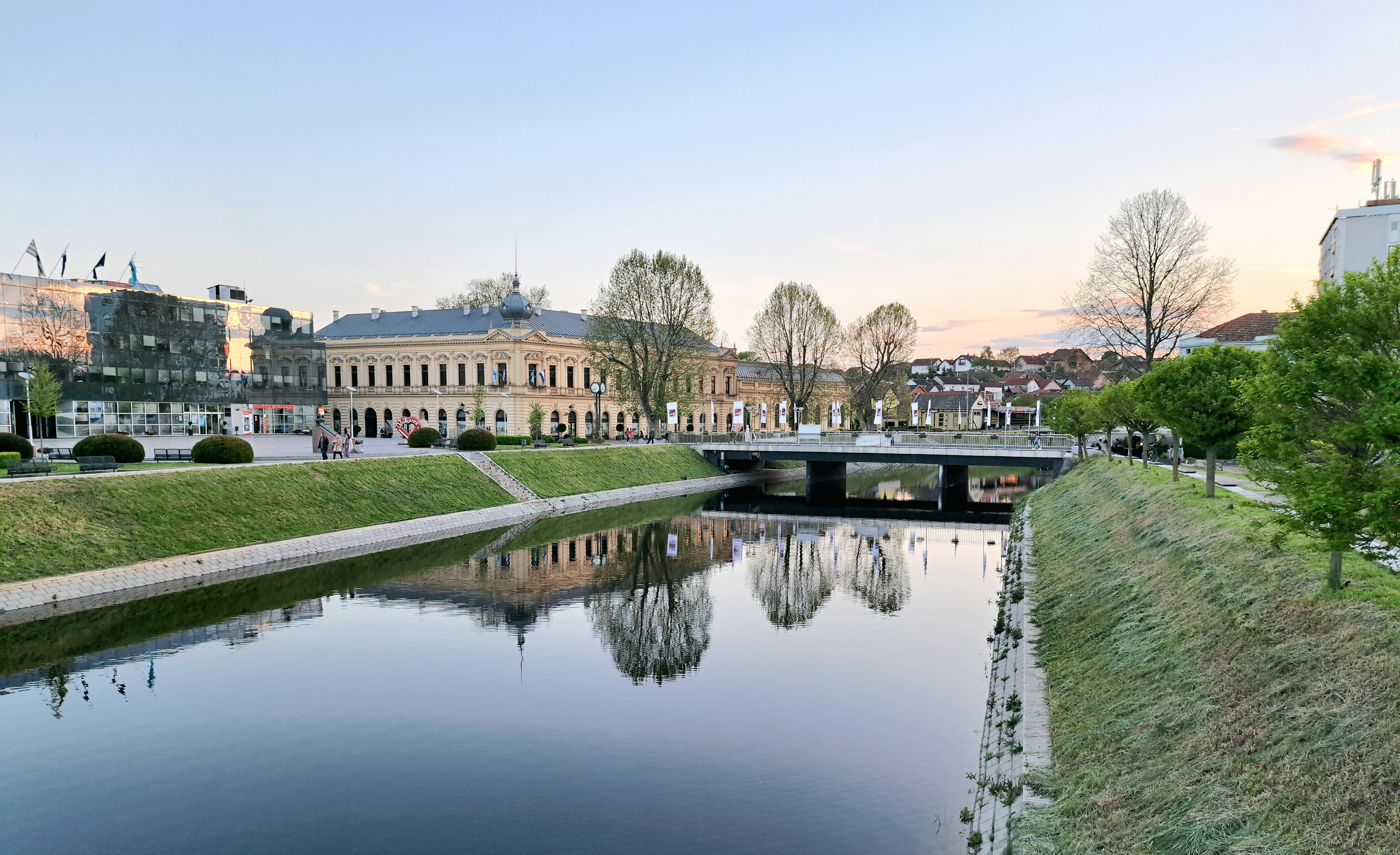
River Vuka iv Vukovar town center

Vuka is a river in eastern Croatia, a right tributary of the Danube river. At 112 kilometres (70 miles), it is the 13th-longest river flowing through Croatia and it has a drainage area of 644 square kilometres (249 square miles).

The river is located in the region of Slavonia. It rises in the Krndija hills in the Osijek-Baranja County and flows eastwards through lowlands into the Vukovar-Srijem County. It empties into the Danube at the town of Vukovar, which is named for the river.

The ancient name of Pannonian Illyrians for Vuka was Volcos.

== Settlements along the river basin ==
- Borovik
- Podgorje Bračevačko
- Razbojište
- Budimci (2 km away)
- Krndija (1 km away)
- Jurjevac Punitovački
- Beketinci
- Hrastovac
- Vuka
- Dopsin (1 km away)
- Hrastin
- Hudeston (Named after Huđï)
- Petrova Slatina (0,5 km away)
- Paulin Dvor (0,8 km away)
- Ernestinovo (1,5 km away)
- Ada
- Laslovo
- Podrinje
- Palača (1 km away)
- Markušica
- Gaboš
- Antin (2 km away)
- Mlaka Antinska
- Ostrovo (2 km away)
- Tordinci
- Pačetin (2 km away)
- Nuštar (2 km away)
- Marinci
- Bršadin
- Bogdanovci
- Vukovar

== See also ==
- Volcae
- Vučedol culture
- Bobota Canal
