= D518 road =

Road in Croatia

D518 state road

Route information
- Length: 32.9 km (20.4 mi)

Major junctions
- From: D2 near Osijek (Trpimirova interchange)
- To: D46 near Vinkovci

Location
- Country: Croatia
- Counties: Osijek-Baranja, Vukovar-Syrmia
- Major cities: Vinkovci, Osijek

Highway system
- Highways in Croatia

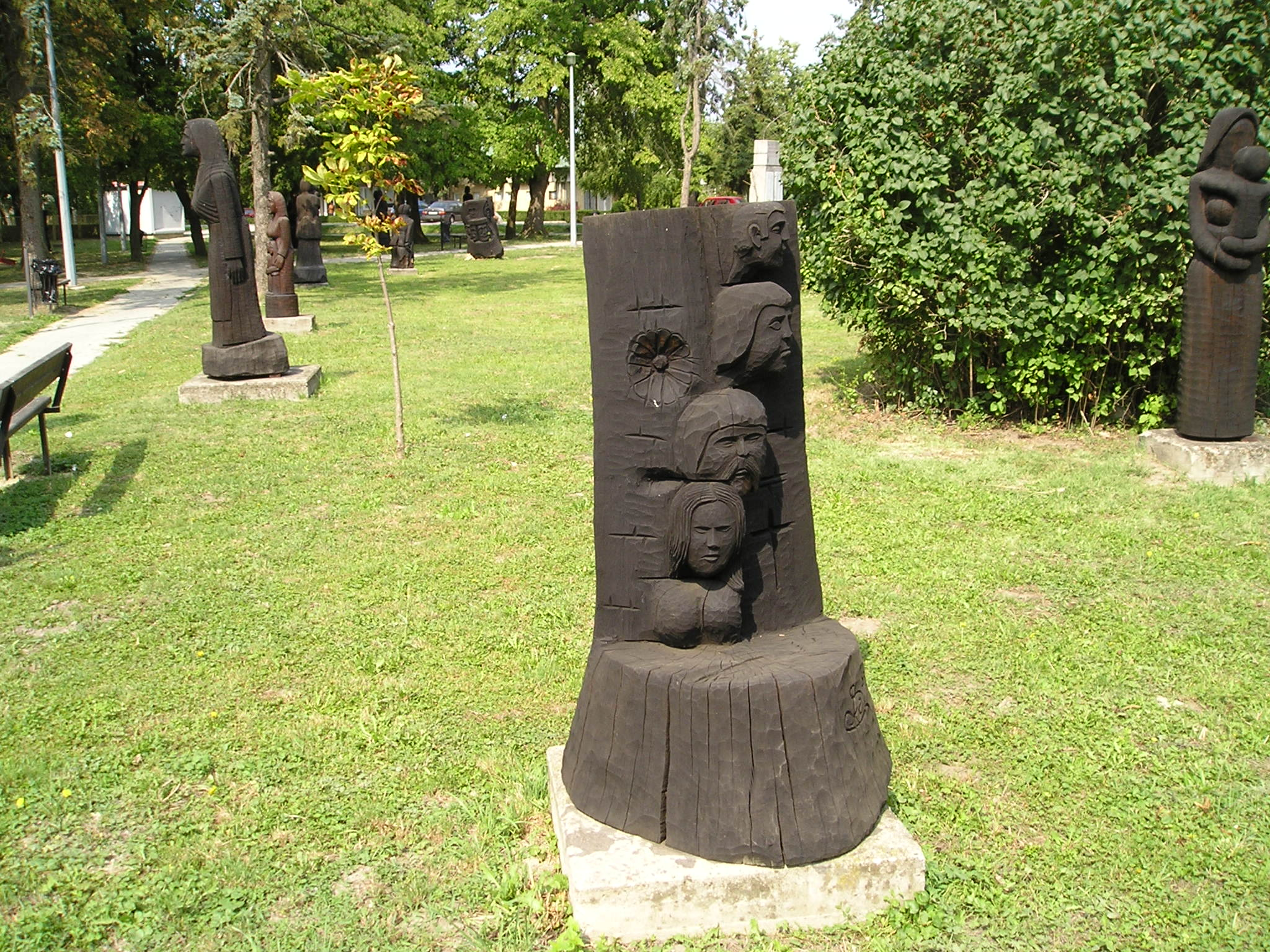
Ernestinovo, naïve art centre, next to the D518 road

D518 is a state road connecting the Osijek bypass and the Vinkovci bypass. The road is 32.9 km (20.4 mi) long.

The road, as well as all other state roads in Croatia, is managed and maintained by Hrvatske ceste, state owned company.

== Traffic volume ==
Traffic is regularly counted and reported by Hrvatske ceste, operator of the road.

D518 traffic volume
Road	Counting site	AADT	ASDT	Notes
D518	2509 Brijest	5,192	5,165	Between the D2 and Ž4086 junctions.

== Road junctions and populated areas ==
D518 junctions/populated areas
Type	Slip roads/Notes
	D46 south of Jarmina, to Vinkovci bypass (D55) and Đakovo (D7). The southern terminus of the road.
	Jarmina; Ž4149 to Karadžićevo.
	Gaboš; Ž4134 to Ostrovo.
	Markušica
	Podrinje
	Ada
	Laslovo; Ž4121 to Korog.
	Ernestinovo; Ž4109 to Paulin Dvor and Vladislavci. Ž4130 to Petrova Slatina, Šodolovci and Semeljci.
	Divoš
	Ž4089 to Ivanovac and Čepin.
	Antunovac
	Ž4086 to Brijest.
	Trpimirova interchange D2 to the A5 motorway Osijek interchange, Koška (D517) and Našice (D53, D515) (to the west) and to Erdut (via the D213) (to the east). Ž4257 to Osijek via Trpimirova Street. The northern terminus of the road.
