= Battle of Osijek =

1991–92 battle of the Croatian War of Independence

Coordinates: 45.56°N 18.67°E

- Part of the Croatian War of Independence
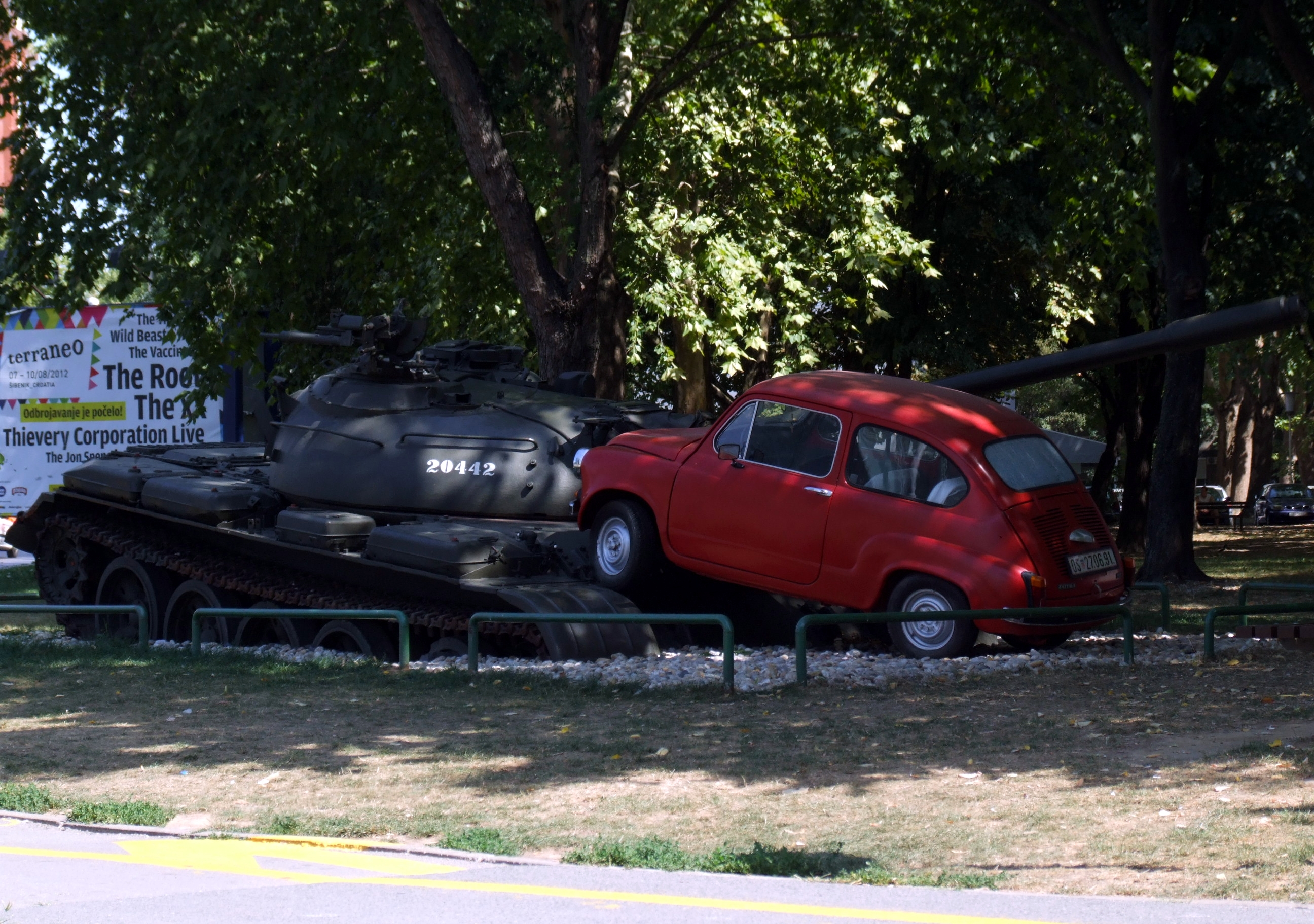
- "Fićo gazi tenka!" monument to the Battle of Osijek
Date	August 1991 – June 1992
Location	Osijek, Croatia
Result	Ceasefire

Belligerents
Yugoslavia	Croatia

Commanders and leaders
Andrija Biorčević	Branimir Glavaš; Karl Gorinšek

Units involved
Yugoslav People's Army; Yugoslav Ground Forces; 1st Guards Division; 1st Guards Brigade; 2nd Guards Brigade; 3rd Guards Brigade; 12th Corps; 12th Mechanized Brigade; 12th Mixed Artillery Regiment; Yugoslav Air Force; Serb Volunteer Guard	Croatian Army; 3rd Guards Brigade; 106th Osijek Brigade; 135th Baranja Brigade; Frankopan Battalion; Croatian Police; Orao Special Police Unit

Casualties and losses
Unknown	800 soldiers and civilians killed

The Battle of Osijek (Serbo-Croatian: Bitka za Osijek) was the artillery bombardment of the Croatian city of Osijek by the Yugoslav People's Army (JNA) which took place from August 1991 to June 1992 during the Croatian War of Independence. Shelling peaked in late November and December 1991, then diminished in 1992 after the Vance plan was accepted by the combatants. Airstrikes and attacks by JNA infantry and armored units against targets in the city accompanied the bombardment, which caused approximately 800 deaths and resulted in a large portion of the city's population leaving. Croatian sources estimated that 6,000 artillery shells were fired against Osijek over the period.

After the JNA captured Vukovar on 18 November 1991, Osijek was the next target for its campaign in Croatia. The JNA units subordinated to the 12th (Novi Sad) Corps, supported by the Serb Volunteer Guard, achieved modest advances in late November and early December, capturing several villages south of Osijek, but the Croatian Army maintained its defensive front and limited the JNA's advances.

In the aftermath of the Battle of Osijek, Croatian authorities charged thirteen JNA officers with war crimes against civilians, but no arrests have been made to date. Croatian authorities also charged the wartime commander of Osijek's defence, Branimir Glavaš, and five others with war crimes committed in the city in 1991. The five were convicted and received sentences ranging between eight and ten years, and as of March 2015, judicial proceedings against Glavaš are in progress.

== Background ==
In 1990, following the electoral defeat of the government of the Socialist Republic of Croatia, ethnic tensions worsened. The Yugoslav People's Army (Jugoslovenska Narodna Armija – JNA) confiscated the weapons of Croatia's Territorial Defence (Teritorijalna obrana – TO) to minimize potential resistance. On 17 August 1990, the escalating tensions turned into open revolt by the Croatian Serbs. The revolt took place in the predominantly Serb-populated areas of the Dalmatian hinterland around Knin and in parts of the Lika, Kordun, Banovina regions and eastern Croatia. In January 1991, Serbia, supported by Montenegro and Serbia's provinces of Vojvodina and Kosovo, made two unsuccessful attempts to obtain approval from the Yugoslav Presidency to deploy the JNA to disarm Croatian security forces.

After a bloodless skirmish between Serb insurgents and Croatian special police in March, the JNA itself, supported by Serbia and its allies, asked the federal Presidency to grant it wartime powers and declare a state of emergency. The request was denied on 15 March 1991, and the JNA came under the control of Serbian President Slobodan Milošević in the summer of 1991 as the Yugoslav federation started to fall apart. By the end of the month, the conflict had escalated, resulting in the first fatalities of the war. The JNA then stepped in to support the insurgents and prevent Croatian police from intervening. In early April, leaders of the Serb revolt in Croatia announced their intention to integrate the areas under their control with Serbia. The Government of Croatia considered this an act of secession.

== Timeline ==
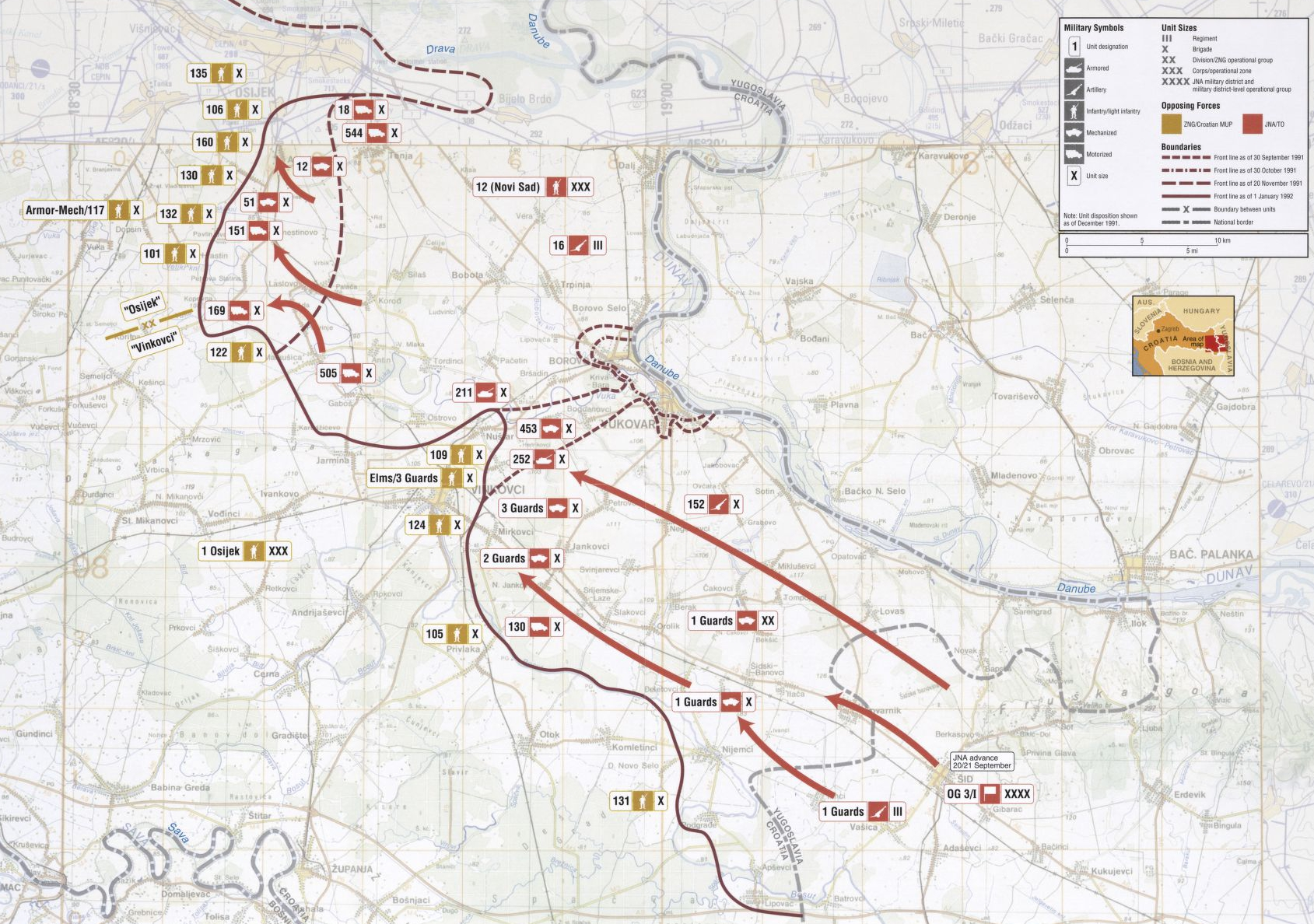
Map showing the fighting in eastern Slavonia, September 1991 – January 1992; Osijek is located in the bulge (salient) near the top of the map

The JNA intervened directly against Croatia for the first time on 3 July 1991, driving Croatian forces out of Baranja, north of the city of Osijek, and out of Erdut, Aljmaš and Dalj east of Osijek. The advance was followed by intermittent fighting around Osijek, Vukovar and Vinkovci. At several points, JNA positions approached to within several hundred yards of Osijek city limits.

The JNA units near Osijek were subordinated to the 12th (Novi Sad) Corps, commanded by Major General Andrija Biorčević. In the city itself, the JNA had several barracks which housed the 12th Proletarian Mechanised Brigade and the 12th Mixed Artillery Regiment. The 12th Proletarian Mechanised Brigade contained one of a handful battalions maintained by the JNA at full combat readiness. Osijek was established as their starting point in a planned westward offensive toward Našice and Bjelovar.

Croatian forces in the area were formally subordinated to the Operational Zone Command in Osijek headed by Colonel Karl Gorinšek. In practice, the city's defense was overseen by Branimir Glavaš, then head of the National Defence Office in Osijek, according to information presented at Glavaš trial in the 2000s. Glavaš formally became commander of city defenses on 7 December 1991.

=== Bombardment of the city ===
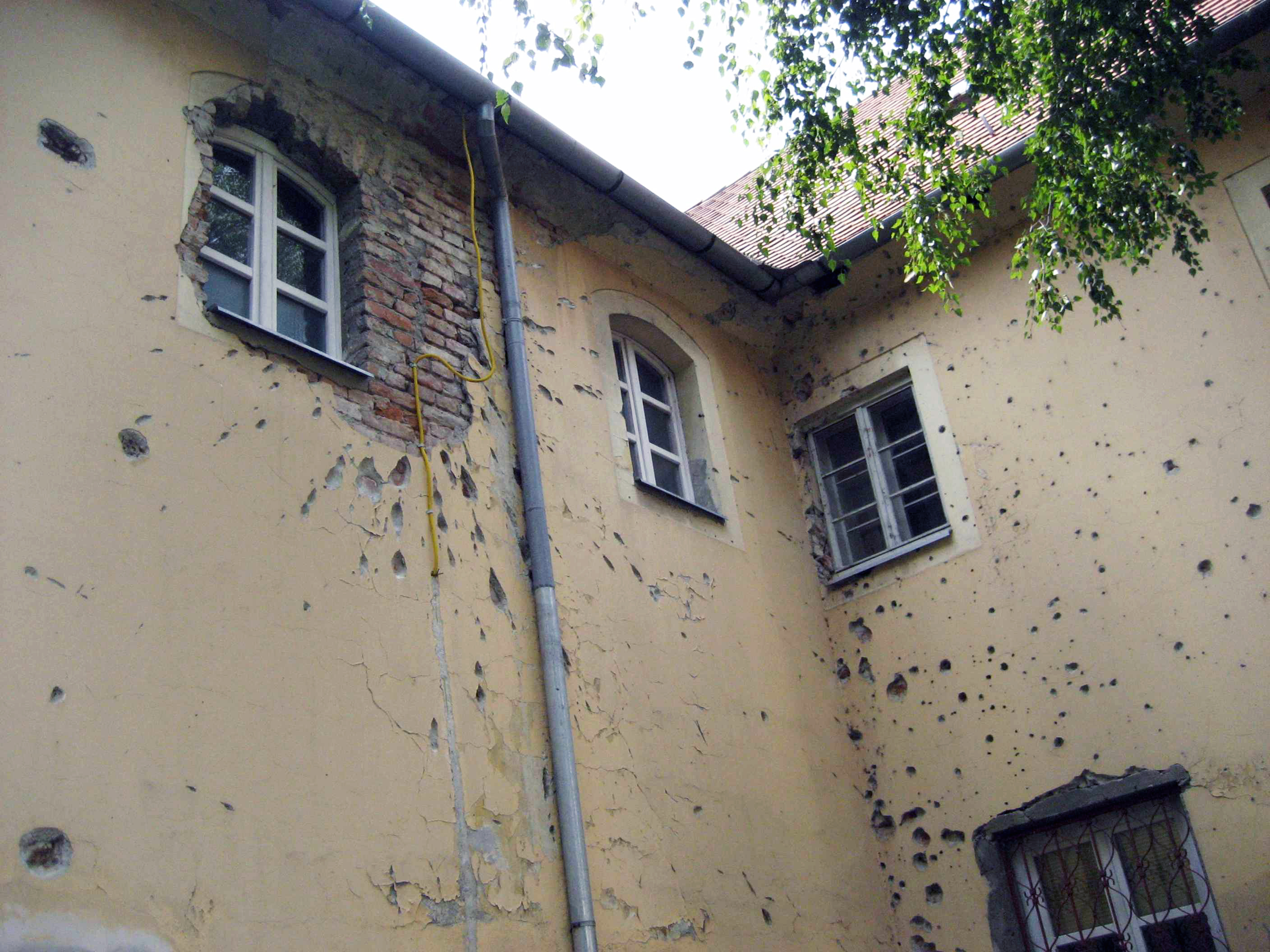
Partially repaired bombardment damage in Osijek

The JNA first attacked Osijek by mortar fire on 31 July 1991, and heavily bombarded the city's center on 19 August 1991. The attacks came from positions north, east and south of Osijek, and were supported by JNA garrisons stationed in Osijek itself. On 7–9 September, an inconclusive battle was fought in Tenja, within three kilometres (1.9 miles) of the city. The JNA garrisons were besieged by Croatian forces in mid-September. After a barracks in the city centre was captured on 15 September 1991, the remaining JNA garrison tried to break through the Croatian troops besieging the barracks and, after heavy fighting, reached JNA positions south of Osijek on 17 September 1991. The intensity of the shelling increased thereafter, peaking through November and December. After a ceasefire was arranged in January 1992, following the acceptance of the Vance plan, the artillery attacks dropped off and became intermittent, and ceased by June.

During its height, the intensity of the bombardment was reported to reach as high as one shell per minute, and the artillery attacks were compounded by Yugoslav Air Force strikes against the city. According to Croatian sources, a total of 6,000 artillery shells were fired against Osijek in the period. Prior to the start of the bombardment, the civilian population of Osijek totaled 104,761 city residents and 129,792 municipal residents. These numbers were significantly reduced as civilians fled the fighting. It is estimated that only about a third of the population remained in the city by the end of November, with some sources placing the estimate even lower, suggesting that the population of the city was reduced to just 10,000 civilians during the most intense periods of the bombardment. Those who remained in Osijek through the fighting generally slept in bomb shelters.

=== Ground offensive ===
Map of eastern Slavonia area between Osijek and Vukovar (Modern county lines provided for reference)

After the JNA captured Vukovar on 18 November, the JNA 12th (Novi Sad) Corps, supported by Serbian Ministry of Interior-trained Serb Volunteer Guard paramilitaries, began advancing west between Vinkovci and Osijek on 20 November. Osijek was considered the likely next target of the JNA, a view later confirmed by General Života Panić, commander of the JNA 1st Military District.

On 21 November 1991, the JNA captured the villages of Stari Seleš, Novi Seleš and Ernestinovo situated approximately ten kilometres (6.2 miles) south of Osijek. Laslovo, five kilometres (3.1 miles) south of Ernestinovo, was captured three days later. Those developments threatened Đakovo and pointed to the potential encirclement of Osijek. On 4 December 1991, the Special Envoy of Secretary-General of the United Nations Cyrus Vance visited Osijek to inspect the damage.

In early December, the JNA made modest advances, capturing Antunovac located six kilometres (3.7 miles) south of Osijek on 5 December 1991. On the same day, an armoured JNA force unsuccessfully attacked positions held by the Croatian 106th Brigade in Rosinjača Forest near Nemetin, approximately two kilometres (1.2 miles) east of Osijek. On 6 December, the JNA pushed Croatian troops out from Tenja, followed by a heavy attack against Osijek repulsed by the Croatian Army (Hrvatska vojska – HV) on 7 December. On 11 December, HV personnel entered the frontline village of Paulin Dvor, less than three kilometres (1.9 miles) west of Ernestinovo, and summarily executed 19 civilians (18 Serbs and one Hungarian). The JNA captured Paulin Dvor five days later, on 16 December, and attacked Osijek once again. The HV managed to contain the attack, though fighting continued south of Osijek until January 1992.

=== Operation Devil's Beam ===
JNA advances north of Osijek threatened HV control of a narrow bridgehead held across the Drava River, skirting the city's northern edge. By mid-December, the bridgehead had been reduced to a strip of land opposite Osijek, encompassing the suburban settlements of Podravlje and Tvrđavica. In order to remove the threat, the HV launched an offensive codenamed Operation Devil's Beam (Croatian: Operacija Đavolja greda) on 17–18 December. The operation involved the 1st Battalion of the 135th Brigade, elements of the special forces Frankopan Battalion, the Osijek-based Orao special police unit, the Drava River flotilla, artillery of the 106th Brigade, and personnel of the 4th Beli Manastir Police Station. It successfully forced the JNA north across the Stara Drava oxbow lake, located approximately four kilometres (2.5 miles) north of Osijek. The JNA also withdrew from the village of Kopačevo towards Darda and Vardarac, but the HV lacked sufficient resources to exploit the development. The HV suffered eight killed in the operation, and the JNA advance towards Osijek from the north was halted.

== Aftermath ==
By June 1992, approximately 800 people had been killed by the bombardment. By the end of the Croatian War of Independence in 1995, a total of 1,724 people from Osijek had been killed, including 1,327 soldiers and 397 civilians. The city itself suffered great damage during the war, with the bulk of direct damage occurring as a consequence of the 1991–92 bombardment. Direct war damage sustained by the city was estimated at a total of US$1.3 billion. The damage was regularly recorded by 400 volunteers during the bombardment.

Although media reported on the bombardment of Osijek, journalists in the city itself felt that it was receiving an unduly low level of media coverage compared to wartime events elsewhere in Croatia. The attacks on Osijek were welcomed by the Pravoslavlje newspaper published by the Serbian Orthodox Church, which appeared to give a blessing to the attack as a part of a "holy war", setting it in the context of World War II massacres and concentration camps in the Independent State of Croatia.

The JNA withdrew from Croatia in 1992, but continued to contribute personnel and equipment to the Army of the Republic of Serbian Krajina (ARSK) which controlled the areas previously held by the JNA. Although the United Nations Protection Force peacekeepers deployed to the area on the basis of the Vance plan and placed most of the ARSK heavy weapons in storage, Osijek was intermittently bombarded throughout the war—the last artillery strike occurred in September 1995. The hostilities ceased in November 1995 through the Erdut Agreement securing restoration of Croatian rule in the region.

In November 2010, then-Croatian President Ivo Josipović officially apologized for the Paulin Dvor massacre, shortly after his Serbian counterpart Boris Tadić issued a formal apology for the massacre at Vukovar.

=== War crime trials ===
In 2008, Croatian authorities formally charged Colonel Boro Ivanović, commanding officer of the JNA 12th Proletarian Mechanised Brigade, and twelve other JNA officers with war crimes against the civilian population. The charges include causing the deaths of 307 civilians in Osijek and surrounding areas, injuries to another 171 civilians, and the destruction of at least 1,188 different structures. As of 2013, all of the indicted officers remain at large in Serbia.

In 2005, the Osijek District Court convicted former Croatian soldier Nikola Ivanković for his involvement in the killings at Paulin Dvor, and sentenced him to 15 years in prison. In 2012, Enes Vitesković was also convicted for his involvement in the atrocity, and given an eleven-year sentence.

After the war, five Croatian fighters were charged and convicted of eleven counts of murder, one of attempted murder, and one of torture of Serb civilians found in the JNA barracks, which surrendered on 15 September 1991. They received prison sentences of between five and eight years. Glavaš, who was tried alongside them for the same crimes, received a ten-year sentence. Before the conviction became final in 2009, and to avoid extradition, Glavaš fled to Bosnia and Herzegovina, where he had granted citizenship. His sentence was reduced to eight years and became final in 2010, when he was arrested and imprisoned in Bosnia and Herzegovina. In January 2015, the conviction was set aside by the Constitutional Court of Croatia, pending a new trial before the Supreme Court of Croatia.
