= Šodolovci =

Šodolovci Шодоловци (Serbian)
- Municipality
- Šodolovci Municipality; Općina Šodolovci; Општина Шодоловци
- Flag Coat of arms

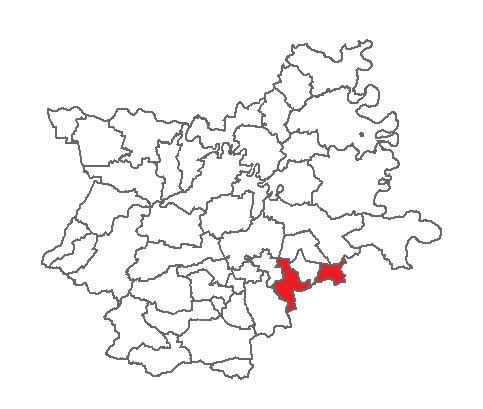

- Location of Šodolovci in Croatia Šodolovci (Croatia) Šodolovci (Europe)
- Coordinates: 45.399748°N 18.620936°E
- Country: Croatia
- Region: Slavonia
- County: Osijek-Baranja County

Government
  - Municipal mayor: Dragan Zorić (SDSS)

Area
  - Municipality: 73.4 km^{2} (28.3 sq mi)
  - Urban: 19.1 km^{2} (7.4 sq mi)

Population (2021)
  - Municipality: 1,217
  - Density: 16.6/km^{2} (42.9/sq mi)
  - Urban: 267
  - Urban density: 14.0/km^{2} (36.2/sq mi)
- Time zone: UTC+1 (Central European Time)
- Postal code: 31 216 Šodolovci
- Area code: +031
- Official languages: Croatian, Serbian
- Website: sodolovci.hr

Šodolovci (Serbian Cyrillic: Шодоловци, Hungarian: Páznán) is a village and a municipality in Osijek-Baranja County in eastern Croatia. In the seven villages of the Šodolovci Municipality, there were 1,653 inhabitants at the time of the 2011 census.

The landscape of the Šodolovci Municipality is marked by the Pannonian Basin plains and agricultural fields of maize, wheat, common sunflower and sugar beet.

== Name ==
The name of the village in Croatian or Serbian is plural.

== Geography ==
Šodolovci Municipality is divided into two parts with the village Palača and the largest village Silaš constituting an exclave separated from the rest of municipality by Ernestinovo Municipality and the village of Laslovo on its closest point. In addition, Silaš Exclave is in itself de facto pene-enclave as the main road between Palača and Silaš goes through the village of Korođ in neighboring Vukovar-Srijem County. Within the main part of the municipality villages Ada and Paulin Dvor are pene-enclaves. Local road between Šodolovci and Ada is not asphalted which is limiting its use during the bad weather conditions and is reorienting transportation over the Ernestinovo Municipality. There is no bridge on Vuka river between Paulin Dvor and the rest of municipality within its boundaries with nearest roads going through Vladislavci or Ernestinovo Municipality. State road D518 passes through the village of Ada. Other county roads include Ž4109 and Ž4130. Local L209 railway between Vinkovci–Gaboš–Osijek passes through the municipality for a couple of hundreds of meters next to the Palača village yet there is no local station as the village is using local station in Laslovo with which it is physically connected. The territory of the municipality is almost completely flat as it is part of the Pannonian Plain. Southern part of the municipality is mostly covered in forest.

== History ==
Most of the villages in Šodolovci Municipality are, in comparison with other settlements in Slavonia, relatively new settlements. The village of Šodolovci was originally a pustara, a Pannonian type of hamlet. Village Ada was established in 1921, Palača in 1920, Paulin Dvor in 1922, Petrova Slatina in 1922, Silaš in 1922 and Šodolovci in 1922. The only exception is the village of Koprivna which was established in 1371. Villages in Šodolovci Municipality were established after the dissolution of Austria-Hungary after World War I and the establishment of Kingdom of Serbs, Croats and Slovenes. Some of the military veterans of the Serbian Army who participated in resistance during the 1914 Serbian Campaign of World War I and in the 1918 Salonica front great Allied offensive were rewarded with land grants at the area of present-day Šodolovci Municipality. In turn, Šodolovci became a colonist settlement established in the course of the land reform in interwar Yugoslavia.

=== Croatian War of Independence ===
The Paulin Dvor massacre was an act of mass murder committed by soldiers of the Croatian Army (HV) in the village of Paulin Dvor, near the town of Osijek on 11 December 1991 during the Croatian War of Independence. Of the nineteen victims, eighteen were ethnic Serbs, and one was a Hungarian national. The ages of the victims, eight women and eleven men, ranged from 41 to 85. Two former Croatian soldiers were convicted for their role in the killings and were sentenced to 15 and 11 years, respectively. In November 2010, Croatian President Ivo Josipović laid a wreath at the graveyard of the massacre victims and officially apologized for the killings.

== Demographics ==
=== Population ===
National structure (2011)
1. Serbs (82.6%)
2. Croats (15.0%)
3. Others (2.42%)

According to the 2011 census, there are 1,365 Serbs, 248 Croats and 40 others. By mother tongue, there are 885 Croatian speakers, 697 Serbian speakers and 71 speakers of other languages. Out of 1,653 inhabitants 874 (52.87%) were female and 779 (47.13%) male with female plurality in each settlement. Largest age group was between 50–54 years with 179 inhabitants. There was not a single child between 0–4 years old in the village of Paulin Dvor while at the level of municipality in total there were 63 inhabitants in this age group.

=== Languages ===
The Serbian language with the Serbian Cyrillic alphabet is the second official language in the municipality of Šodolovci, along with the Croatian language, which is official at the national level. As of 2023, most of the legal requirements for the fulfillment of bilingual standards have not been carried out. Official buildings do have Cyrillic signage, as do seals, but not street signs or traffic signs. Cyrillic is not used on any official documents, but there are public legal and administrative workers proficient in Cyrillic.

=== Religion ===
There are three Serbian Orthodox Churches in Šodolovci Municipality. Those are Church of the Birth of the Most Holy Theotokos in Koprivna, Orthodox Church in Petrova Slatina, and Church of Blessed Prophet Elijah in Silaš. Church of the Birth of the Most Holy Theotokos in Koprivna is a registered monument of architectural heritage from 14th century. This church is a monument of the highest category. It was seriously damaged during the Croatian War of Independence.

== Politics ==
=== Joint Council of Municipalities ===
The Municipality of Šodolovci is one of seven Serb majority member municipalities within the Joint Council of Municipalities, inter-municipal sui generis organization of ethnic Serb community in eastern Croatia established on the basis of Erdut Agreement. As Serb community constitute majority of the population of the municipality it is represented by 2 delegated Councillors at the Assembly of the Joint Council of Municipalities, double the number of Councilors to the number from Serb minority municipalities in Eastern Croatia.

=== Minority councils ===
Directly elected minority councils and representatives are tasked with consulting tasks for the local or regional authorities in which they are advocating for minority rights and interests, integration into public life and participation in the management of local affairs. At the 2023 Croatian national minorities councils and representatives elections Serbs of Croatia fulfilled legal requirements to elect 10 members municipal minority councils of the Šodolovci Municipality.

== Settlements ==
According to the 2011 census, the municipality consists of 7 settlements:

- Ada, population 200
- Koprivna, population 113
- Palača, population 241
- Paulin Dvor, population 76
- Petrova Slatina, population 209
- Silaš, population 476
- Šodolovci, population 338

== Economy ==
Šodolovci is underdeveloped municipality which is statistically classified as the First Category Area of Special State Concern by the Government of Croatia. Šodolovci Municipality's development index is below 50% of national average which is lower than the average for the Osijek-Baranja County which is between 50-75% of national average. There is only 15 registered small businesses in Šodolovci Municipality, 5 in Silaš, 5 in Palača, 3 in Šodolovci and 2 in Petrova Slatina. Those businesses are registered for wholesale and retail trade, agriculture, cereal production, production of plastic products, road transport of goods, accounting, bookkeeping and auditing services and for trade in tobacco products.

== Sport ==
The football club NK Hajduk Veljko named after Hajduk Veljko is located in Šodolovci.

== See also ==
- Joint Council of Municipalities
- List of Croatian municipalities with minority languages in official use
