= Silaš =

Silaš Силаш (Serbian)
- Village (Selo)
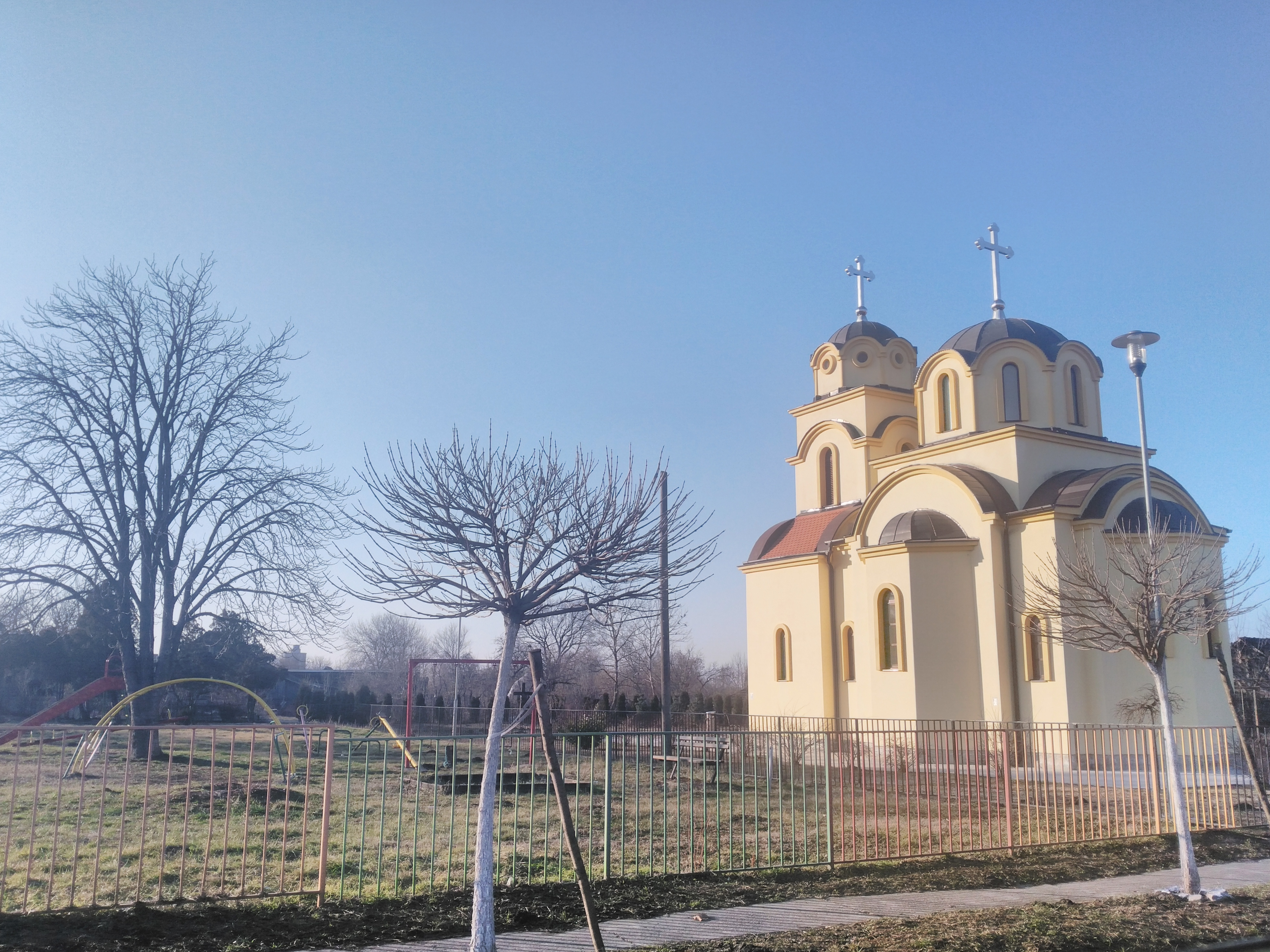

- Location within Osijek-Baranja County Location within Croatia Location within Europe
- Coordinates: 45°25′23″N 18°46′23″E
- Country: Croatia
- County: Osijek-Baranja
- Municipality: Šodolovci

Government
  - Body: Local Committee

Area
  - Total: 15.9 km^{2} (6.1 sq mi)

Population (2021)
  - Total: 326
  - Density: 20.5/km^{2} (53.1/sq mi)
- Time zone: UTC+1 (Central European Time)
- Official languages: Croatian, Serbian

Silaš (Serbian Cyrillic: Силаш, Hungarian: Szilas) is a village in the Šodolovci municipality in Osijek-Baranja County, Croatia. At the time of 2011 Census village's population was 476. Silaš was established in 1922 in the aftermath of the World War I on the spot of abandoned Eltz seigniory. Its original inhabitants were families of Serb soldiers who participated in the Salonica front battles against the German Empire, Austria-Hungary and Bulgaria.

== Geography ==
Šodolovci Municipality is divided into two parts with village Palača and Silaš constituting an exclave separated from the rest of municipality by Ernestinovo Municipality and the village of Laslovo on its closest point. In addition, Silaš Exclave is in itself de facto pene-enclave as the main road between Palača and Silaš goes through the village of Korođ in neighboring Vukovar-Srijem County.

== See also ==
- Šodolovci Municipality
