= Markušica =

Markušica Маркушица (Serbian)
- Municipality
- Municipality of Markušica; Općina Markušica; Општина Маркушица
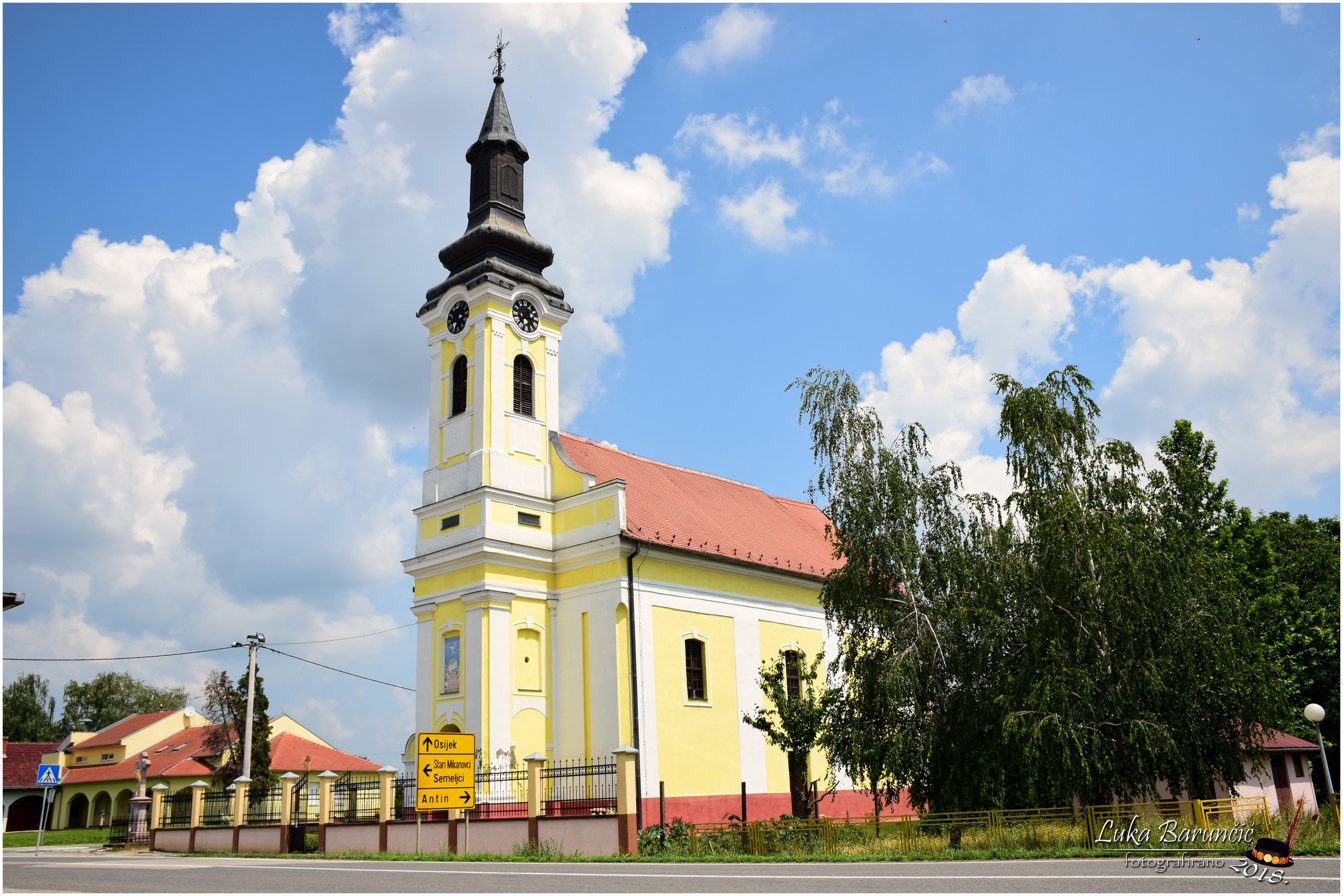
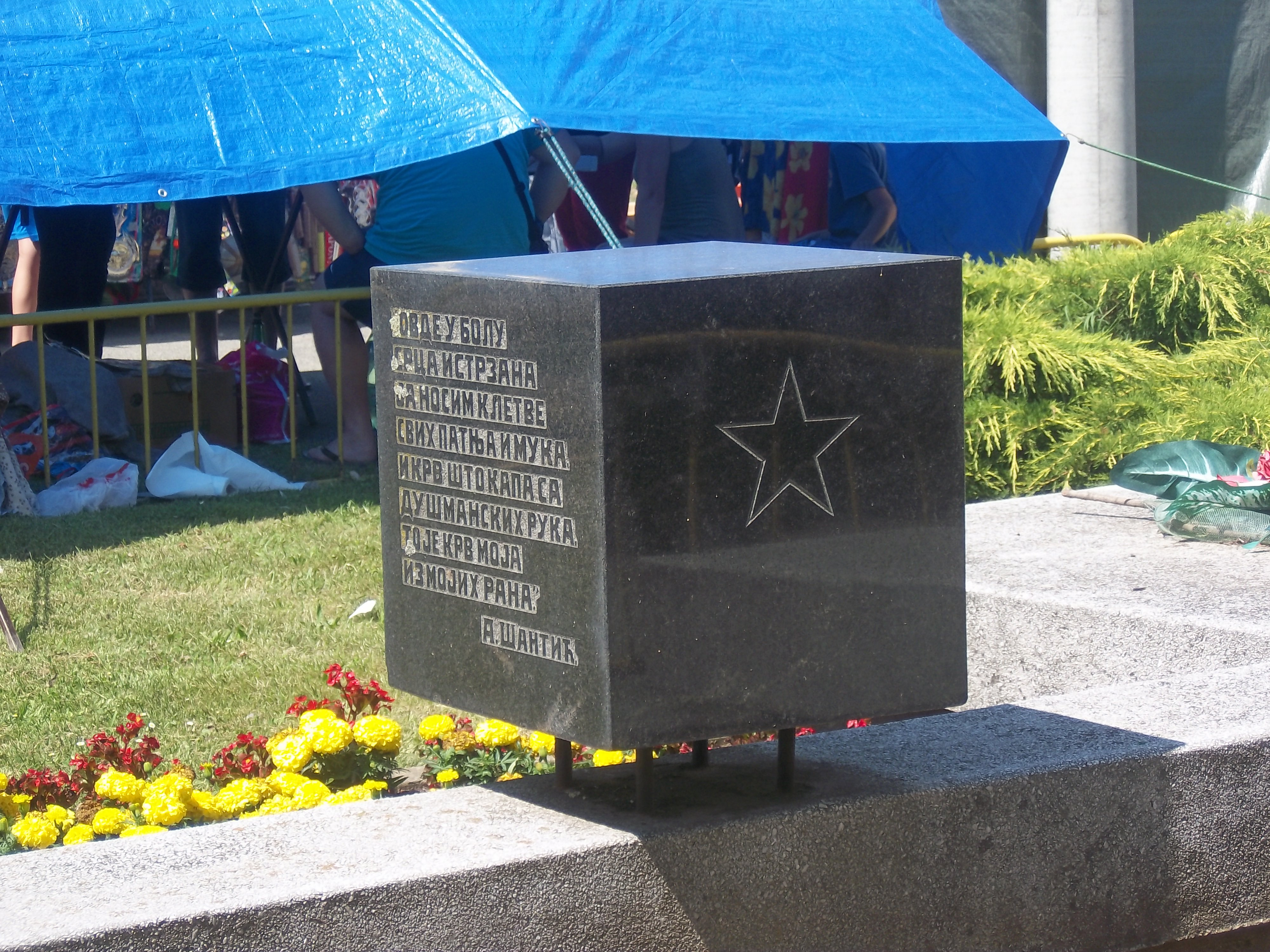
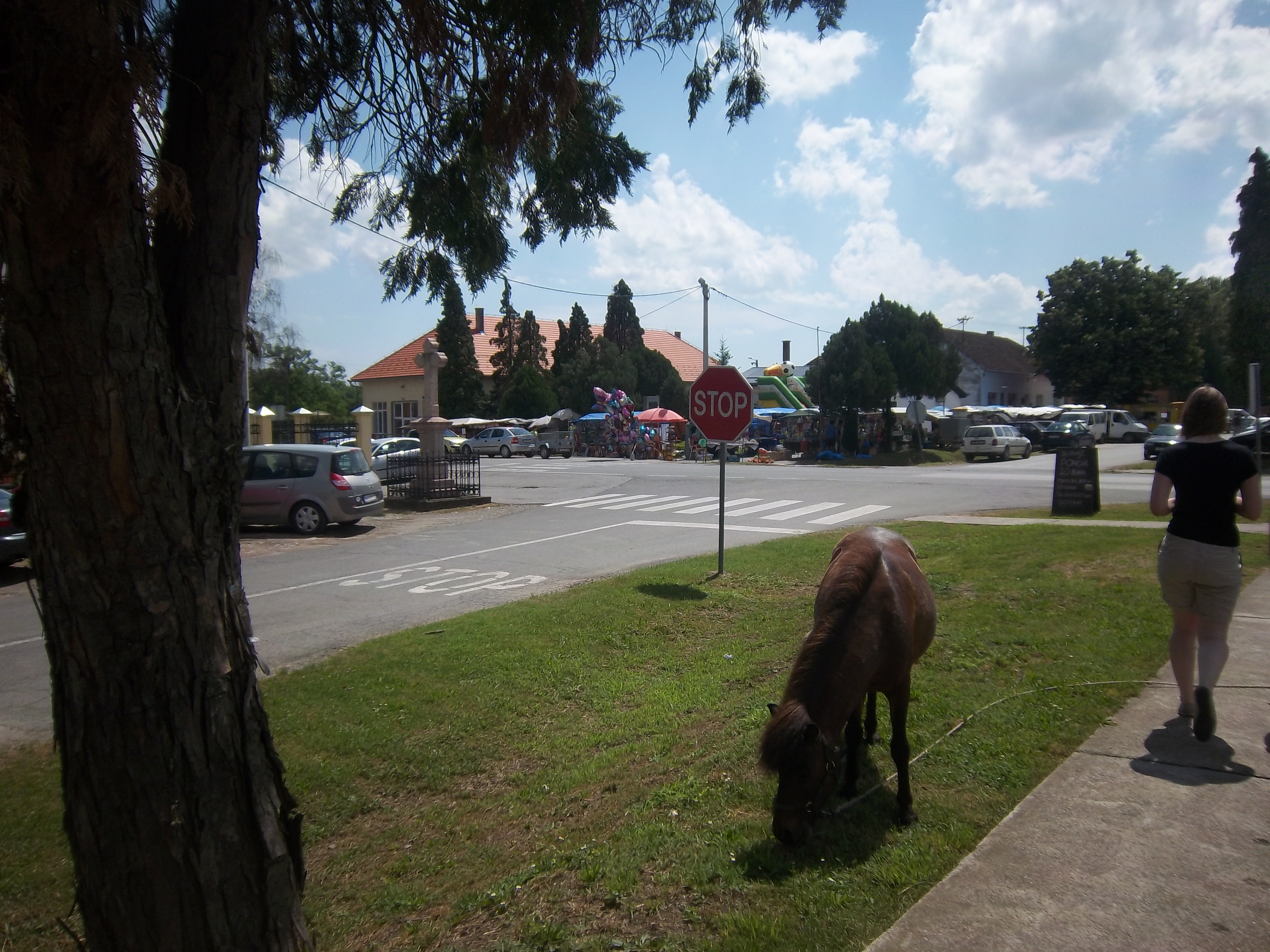
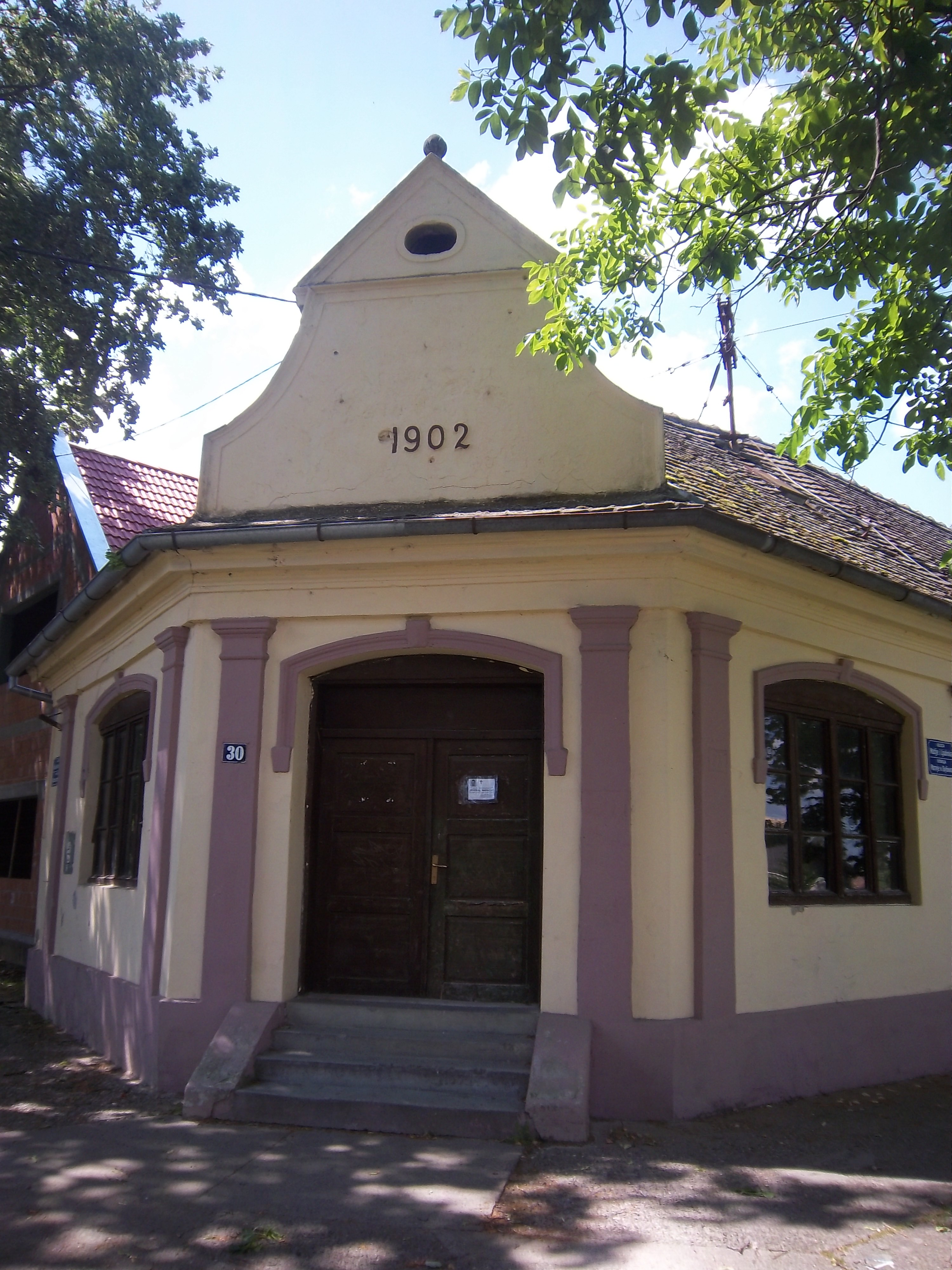
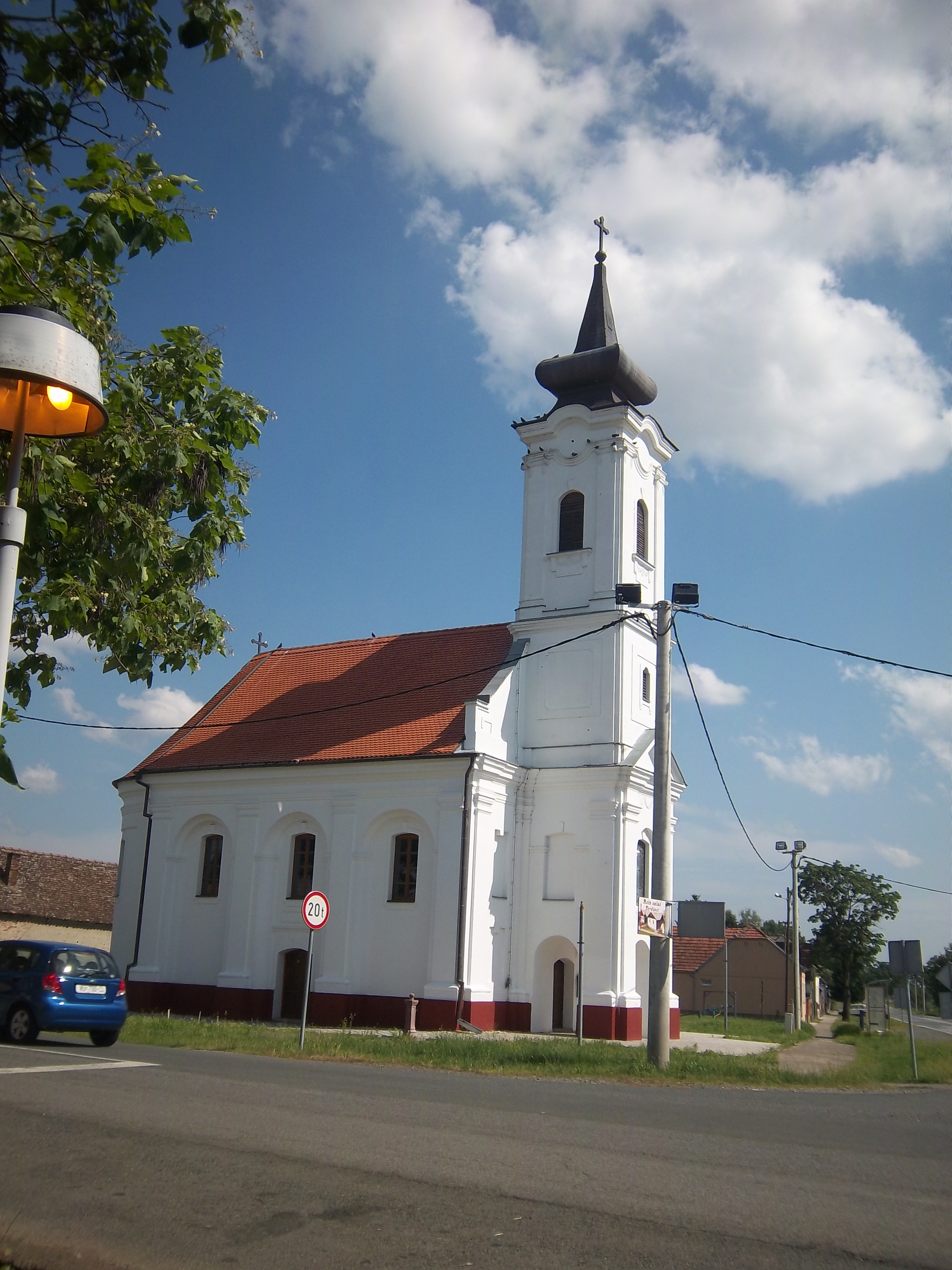
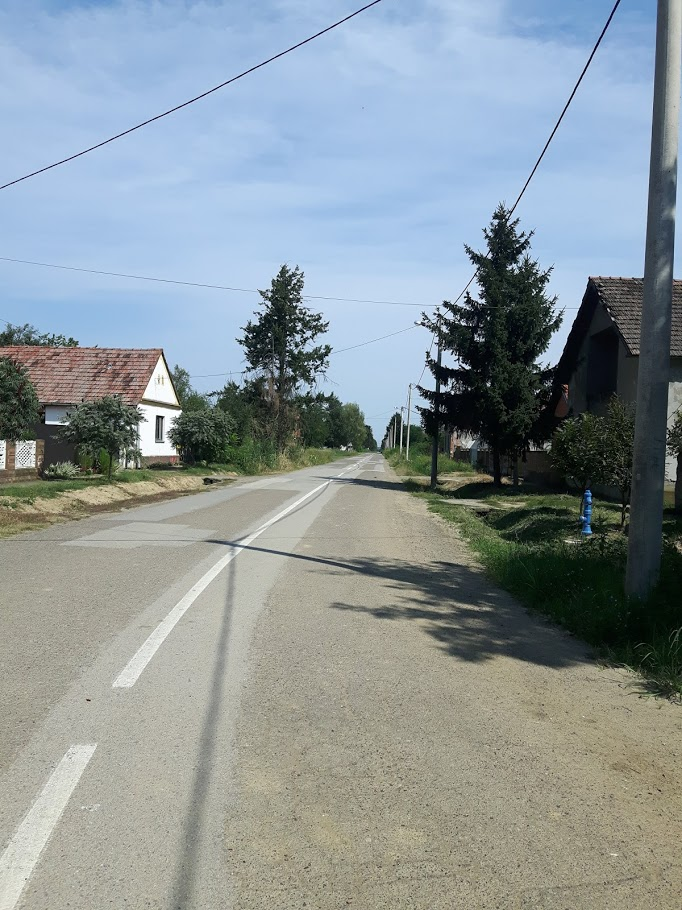
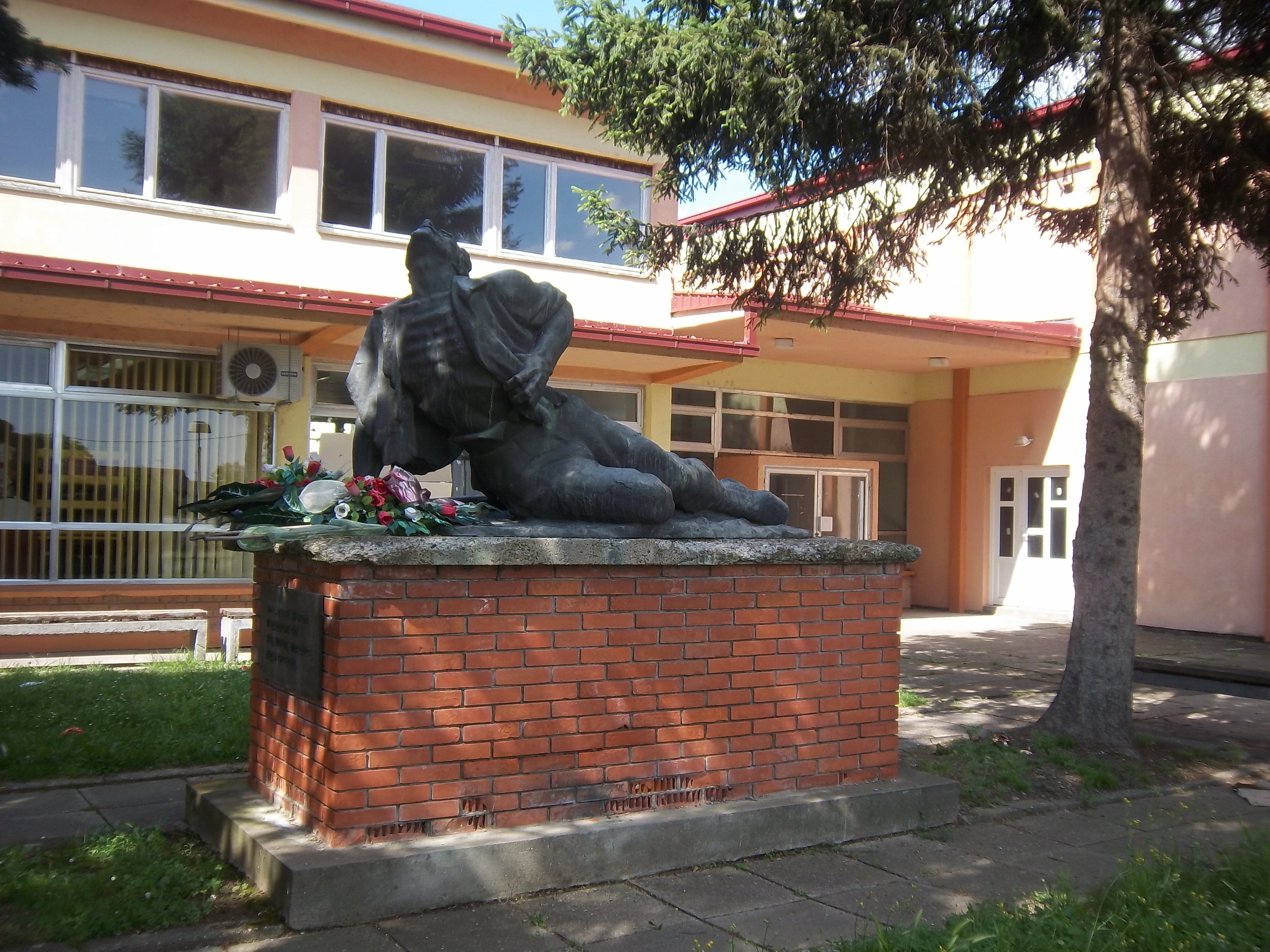
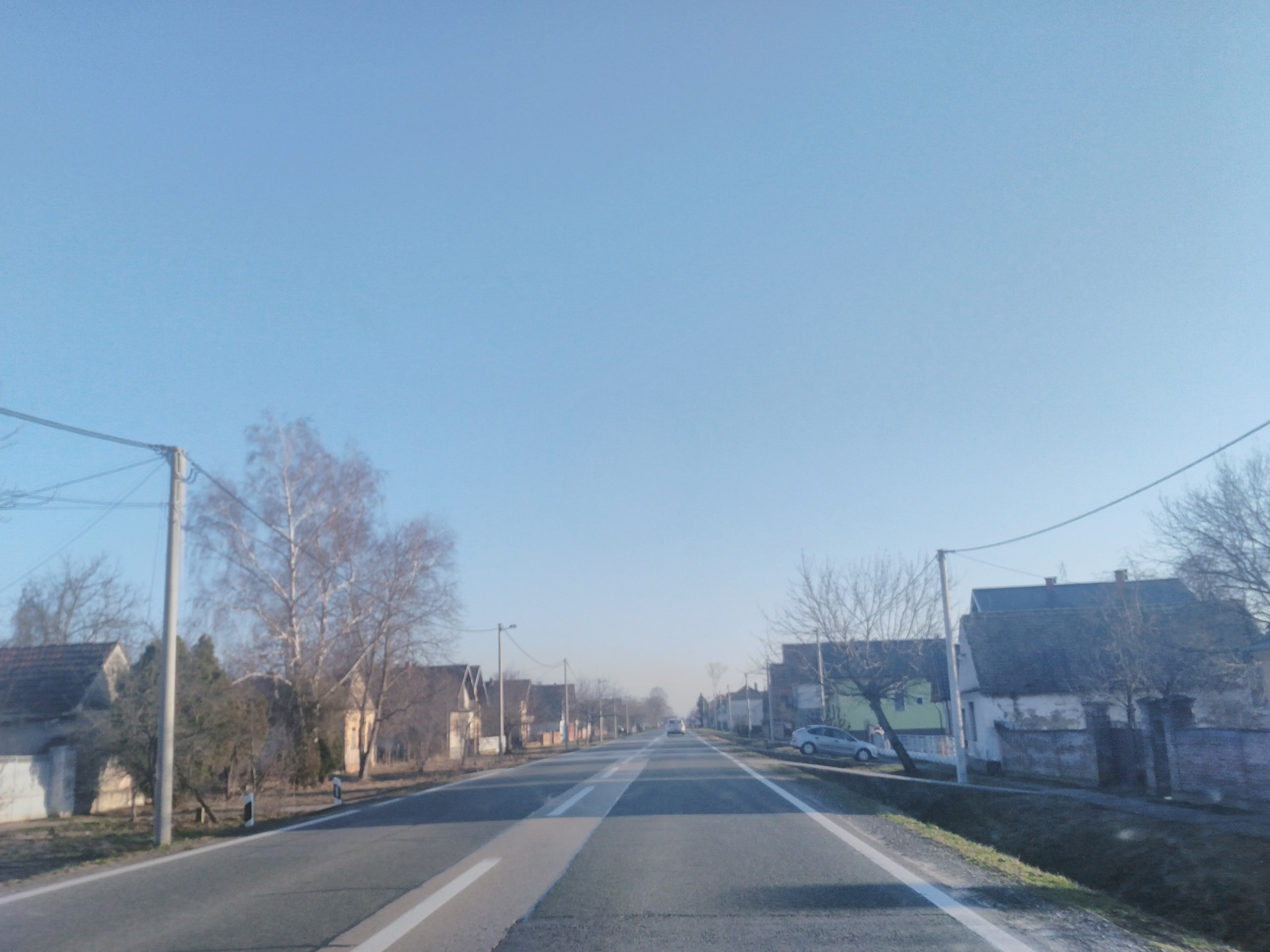
- Villages of the Markušica Municipality

- Coat of arms

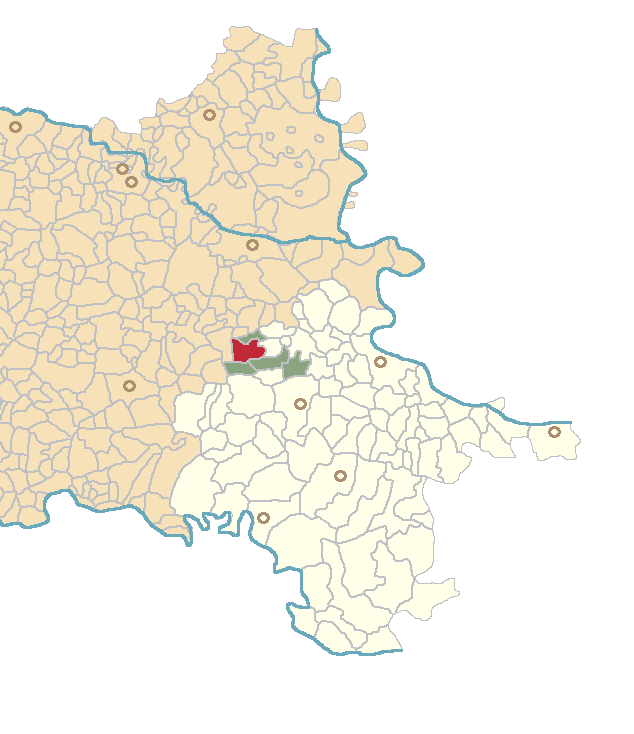

- Location within Vukovar-Syrmia County Location within Croatia Location within Europe
- Coordinates: 45.373766°N 18.706208°E
- Country: Croatia
- Region: Slavonia
- County: Vukovar-Syrmia County

Government
  - Municipal mayor: Tihomir Kolarević (SDSS)

Area
  - Municipality: 73.8 km^{2} (28.5 sq mi)
  - Urban: 22.2 km^{2} (8.6 sq mi)

Population (2021)
  - Municipality: 1,773
  - Density: 24.0/km^{2} (62.2/sq mi)
  - Urban: 733
  - Urban density: 33.0/km^{2} (85.5/sq mi)
- Demonym(s): Serbo-Croatian: Markušičanin (♂) Serbo-Croatian: Markušičanka (♀) (per grammatical gender)
- Time zone: UTC+1 (CET)
- Vehicle registration: VK
- Official languages: Croatian, Serbian
- Website: markusica.hr

Markušica (Serbian Cyrillic: Маркушица, Hungarian: Márkusfalva, German: Sankt Markus) is a village and a municipality in Vukovar-Syrmia County in eastern Croatia. Markušica is located south of the river Vuka and northwest of the town of Vinkovci. The landscape of the Markušica Municipality is marked by the Pannonian Basin plains and agricultural fields of wheat, maize, common sunflower and sugar beet.

The modern day municipality was established in 1997 by the UNTAES administration as one of new predominantly Serb municipalities in order to ensure access to local self-government to Serb community in the region. Alongside Markušica it includes the villages of Gaboš, Karadžićevo, Ostrovo and Podrinje. Before the United Nations administrator implemented anty-gerrymandering reorganization, Markušica and Podrinje were a part of the Tordinci Municipality, while Karadžićevo, Ostrvo and Gaboš were linked to Jarmina Municipality making Serb community minority in both of them.

Markušica Municipality is connected with the surrounding area via D518 road and L209 Vinkovci–Gaboš–Osijek railway, with local stations in Gaboš and Ostrovo.

== Geography ==
The municipality has a total area of 74.29 km^{2} (28.68 sq mi). River Vuka flows through the municipality and territory of the municipality is completely flat, very fertile black soil. It is connected by D518 highway with the rest of the country.

== History ==
One Scordisci archaeological site in Markušica dating back to late La Tène culture was excavated in the 1970s and 1980s as a part of rescue excavations in eastern Croatia. Archaeological site was a part of the settlement network of Scordisci in the area of Vinkovci.

Markušica was one of the feudal villages that existed in the region before the Ottoman rule in Hungary. After the end of Great Turkish War the village was settled by Eastern Orthodox Vlachs from surrounding areas and the eastern Bosnia. Following Ottoman retreat from the region, the Lordship of Nuštar was established, and the village became part of its domain. In 1736 there were 40 inhabited houses in Markušica. In 1866 this number increased at 192 houses and 1003 inhabitants out of which 902 were Eastern Orthodox.

Colonist settlements of Ada, Gaboš, Križevci, Podrinje, and Šodolovci were established on the territory of the village municipality during the land reform in interwar Yugoslavia.

The modern day Municipality of Markušica was established by the decision of the United States diplomat and at the time Transitional Administrator for Eastern Slavonia, Baranja and Western Sirmium Jacques Paul Klein. As the region was directly governed as an UN protectorate Transitional Administrator was the highest authority responsible for administrative affairs. Markušica Municipality was established as one of new predominantly Serb municipalities in order to ensure access to local self-government to Serb community in the region. Prior to the decision, the international community expressed concerns over the perceived gerrymandering, disenfranchisement of refugees and minority representation.

== Demographics ==
=== Population ===
There are 2 555 inhabitants, the majority of the population which are Serbs, who make up 90.10% of the population according to the 2011 population census.

=== Languages ===
Due to the local minority population, the Markušica municipality prescribes the use of not only Croatian as the official language, but the Serbian language and Serbian Cyrillic alphabet as well. As of 2023, most of the legal requirements for the fulfillment of bilingual standards have been carried out. Official buildings do have Cyrillic signage, as do street signs and seals, but not traffic signs. Cyrillic is used most official documents, but there is a lack of Cyrillic fluency among public legal and administrative servants. Of all the municipalities in Croatia in which Cyrillic is co-official, it is most actively used by the administration in Markušica and Borovo. Preserving traditional Serbian place names and assigning street names to Serbian historical figures is legally mandated and carried out.

=== Religion ===
Most of the population are Serbian Orthodox that are practicing their religion in the church that was built in 1810 and re-built in 1989.

== Politics ==
=== Joint Council of Municipalities ===
The Municipality of Markušica is one of seven Serb majority member municipalities within the Joint Council of Municipalities, inter-municipal sui generis organization of ethnic Serb community in eastern Croatia established on the basis of Erdut Agreement. As Serb community constitute the majority of the population of the municipality it is represented by 2 delegated Councillors at the Assembly of the Joint Council of Municipalities, double the number of Councillors to the number from Serb minority municipalities in Eastern Croatia.

=== Municipal government ===
The municipality assembly is composed of 13 representatives, plus additional seats for municipality minority groups if they don't get the proportional number of seats. Assembly members come from electoral lists winning more than 5% of votes. The dominant party in the municipality since the reintegration of eastern Slavonia in 1998 is Independent Democratic Serb Party. 681 or 33,32 % out of 2.044 voters participated in 2017 Croatian local elections with 93,69 % valid votes. With 92,80% and 632 votes, Budimir Brača from Independent Democratic Serb Party was elected as municipality major. As of 2017, the member parties/lists are:

Summary of the 2017 Croatian local elections
Party	Votes	%	Seats
Independent Democratic Serb Party	638	100,00	13
Invalid/blank votes	43	6,31	—
Total	681	100	—
Registered voters/turnout	2.044	33,32	—
Source page 57-58 (in Croatian)

=== Minority councils ===
Directly elected minority councils and representatives are tasked with consulting tasks for the local or regional authorities in which they are advocating for minority rights and interests, integration into public life and participation in the management of local affairs. At the 2023 Croatian national minorities councils and representatives elections Serbs of Croatia fulfilled legal requirements to elect 10 members minority councils of the Markušica Municipality.

== Economy ==
Markušica is an underdeveloped municipality which is statistically classified as the First Category Area of Special State Concern by the Government of Croatia.

== Culture ==
=== Points of Interest ===
Markušica Municipality is famous for a monument dedicated to a soldier killed in World War II. The village has a unique monument to a female Soviet pilot from the Red Army, who fought against the Nazis and whose plane was shot down here. The village also has an Eastern Orthodox Church from 1810, which was damaged in the war in Croatia.

== Associations and Institutions ==
The village has a volunteer fire department.

== Settlements ==
The municipality consists of the following settlements:

- Gaboš, population 516
- Karadžićevo, population 194
- Markušica, population 1,009
- Ostrovo, population 612
- Podrinje, population 224

== See also ==
- Vukovar-Srijem County
- Church of Pentecost, Markušica
- Joint Council of Municipalities
