= Siege of Osijek =

Siege of Osijek may refer to:

- Failed Austrian siege of Ottoman-held Osijek in 1537 that led to the Battle of Gorjani
- Battle of Osijek, bombardment of the Croatian city of Osijek by the Yugoslav People's Army in 1991 and 1992
