= Sarvaš =

Village in Croatia

- Village (Selo)
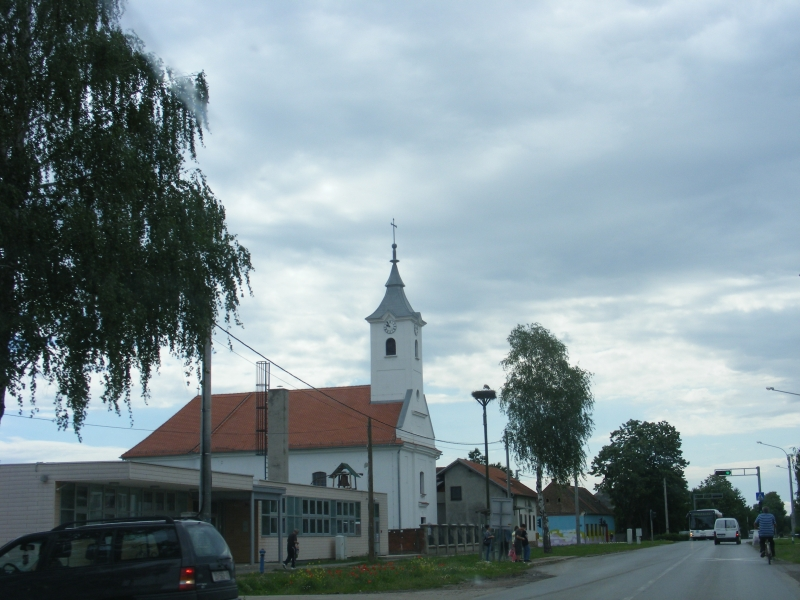
- Sarvaš

- Location within Osijek-Baranja County Location within Croatia Location within Europe
- Country: Croatia
- County: Osijek-Baranja County

Area
  - Total: 19.4 km^{2} (7.5 sq mi)

Population (2021)
  - Total: 1,658
  - Density: 85.5/km^{2} (221/sq mi)
- Time zone: UTC+1 (CET)
  - Summer (DST): UTC+2 (CEST)

Sarvaš (German: Sarwasch-Hirschfeld, Hungarian: Drávaszarvas) is a village in eastern Slavonia, Croatia, east of Osijek. It has a population of 1,658 (census 2021). It is administratively within the area of the city of Osijek. Szarvas means "deer" in Hungarian.

== History ==
One Scordisci archaeological site in Sarvaš dating back to late La Tène culture was excavated in the 1970s and 1980s as a part of rescue excavations in eastern Croatia. Archaeological site was a part of the settlement network of Scordisci in the area of Vinkovci.

In modern history, following Ottoman retreat from the region, the Lordship of Erdut was established in 1730, and the village became part of its domain.

According to the 1931 census in the Kingdom of Yugoslavia, the town's population included 1157 Danube Swabian Germans (the majority). These folk were almost all expelled by the Communist regime of Josip Broz Tito after 1945.

The local Catholic church was completely destroyed in the country's War of Independence. By 2006 the church was restored.
