= Koprivna, Osijek-Baranja County =

Koprivna Копривна (Serbian)
- Village (Selo)
- Location within Osijek-Baranja County Location within Croatia Location within Europe
- Coordinates: 45°24′18″N 18°36′54″E
- Country: Croatia
- County: Osijek-Baranja
- Municipality: Šodolovci

Government
  - Body: Local Committee

Area
  - Total: 6.9 km^{2} (2.7 sq mi)

Population (2021)
  - Total: 92
  - Density: 13/km^{2} (35/sq mi)
- Time zone: UTC+1 (Central European Time)
- Official languages: Croatian, Serbian

Koprivna (Serbian: Копривна, Hungarian: Kaporna) is a village in Osijek-Baranja County, Croatia. It is part of the Šodolovci municipality and it has a population of 113 (census 2011).

== History ==
Following Ottoman retreat from the region, the Lordship of Erdut was established in 1730, and the village became part of its domain.

== See also ==
- Šodolovci Municipality
