= Lordship of Erdut =

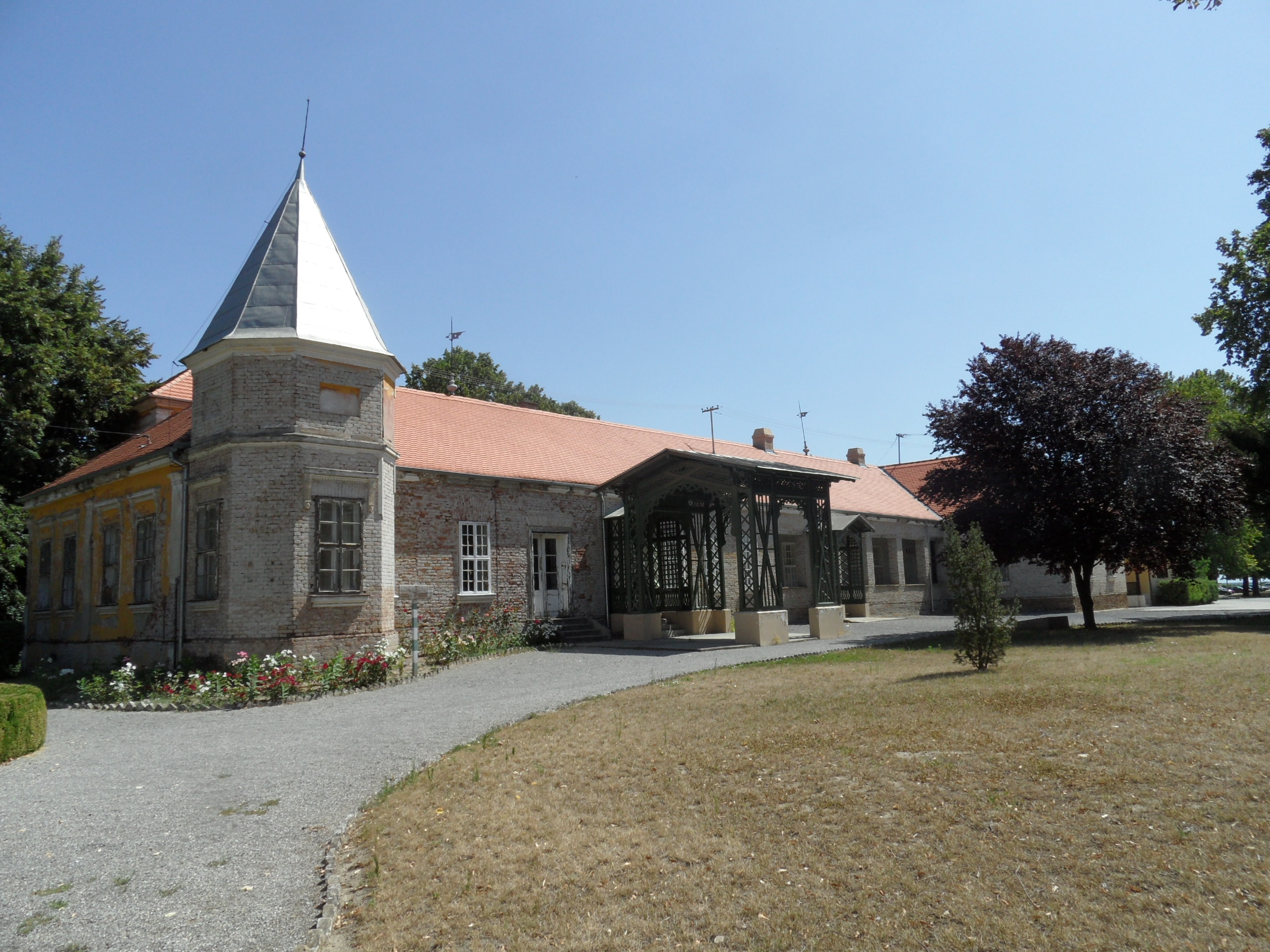
Lordship of Erdut Palace

The Lordship of Erdut was a land estate, lordship, nominally established in the Kingdom of Slavonia in 1730. Contrary to nearby Lordship of Dalj and other regional lordships, which were established in the immediate aftermath of the Ottoman retreat from the region after the 1699 Treaty of Karlowitz, Lordship of Edrut was initially directly controlled by Hofkammer.

It covered the area and settlements in and around the village of Erdut in modern-day Croatia. Alongside Erdut, it included land and villages of Sarvaš, Tenja, Dopsin, Hrastin, Koprivna and Laslovo.

== History ==
Ivan Kapistran Adamović purchased the lordship in 1778 from János Pálffy. In 1855 Adamović family presented 12 bottles of wine produced at the Lordship of Edrut at the Exposition Universelle in Paris. The palace of the lordship was built at the end of 19th and the beginning of 20th century. In 1995 it was the site of signing of the Erdut Agreement.
