= Tenja =

Village in Osijek-Baranja County, Croatia

- Village
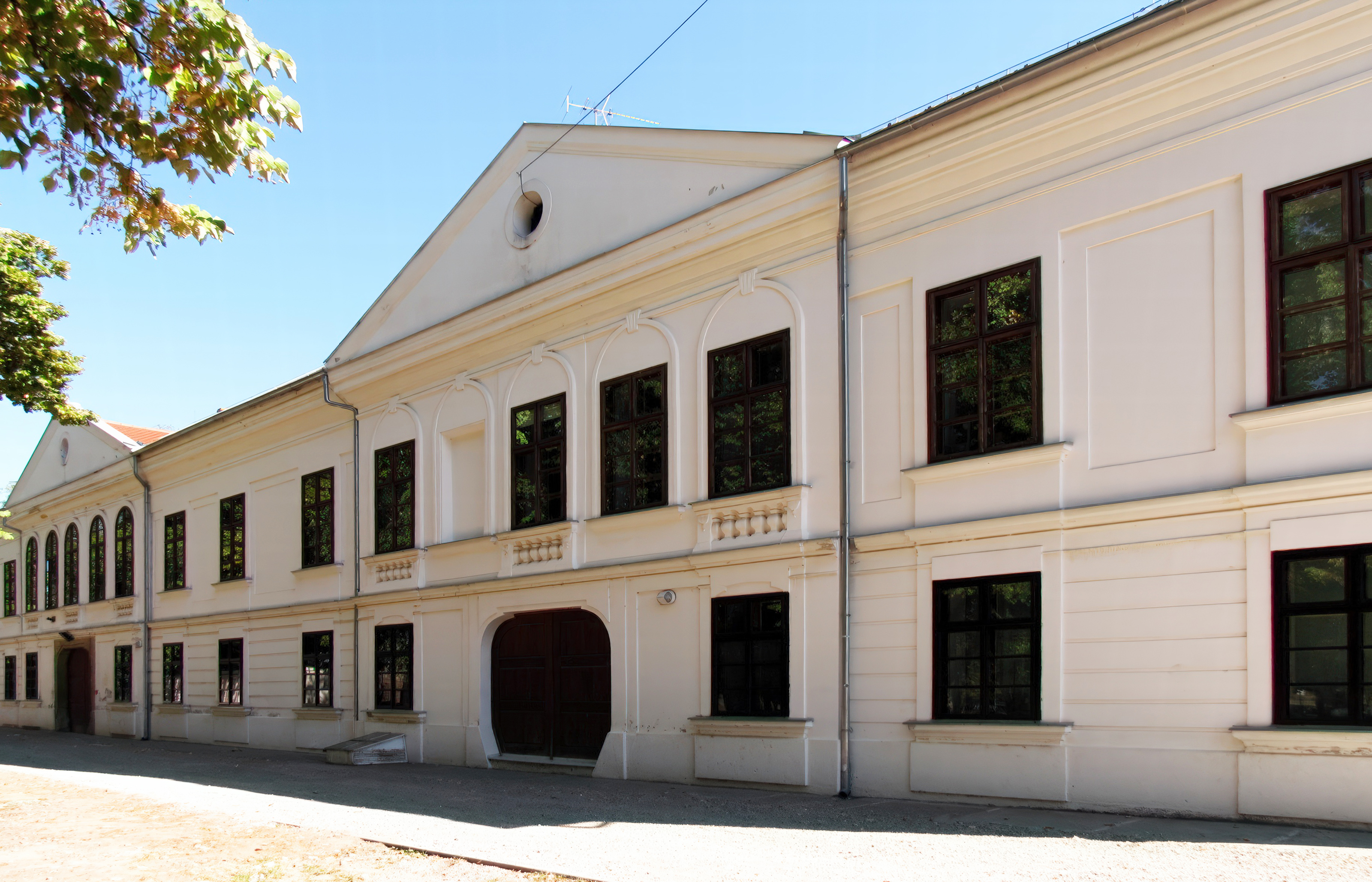
- Adamović Manor

- Location within Croatia Location within Osijek-Baranja County
- Coordinates: 45.501655°N 18.744884°E
- Country: Croatia
- Region: Slavonia (Podunavlje)
- County: Osijek-Baranja
- City: Osijek

Government
  - Body: Local Committee

Area
  - Total: 49.3 km^{2} (19.0 sq mi)

Population (2021)
  - Total: 6,260
  - Density: 127/km^{2} (329/sq mi)
- Time zone: UTC+1 (CET)
  - Summer (DST): UTC+2 (CEST)
- Postal code: 31 207

Tenja (Serbian Cyrillic: Тења) is a village in eastern Slavonia, Croatia, located just southeast of Osijek. It is administratively part of the City of Osijek, with the Tenja Local Committee covering the entire settlement. Tenja had a population of 6,260 in the 2021 census.

== History ==
Tenja was under Ottoman rule from around 1526 to 1683 and was part of the Sanjak of Pojega. Following the end of Ottoman rule in the region, the Lordship of Erdut was established in 1730, and Tenja became part of its domain.

The Church of St Anne dates to 1754, while the local Orthodox parish dates to 1761. The Adamović family acquired the estate in 1778. Adamović Manor was built in the late 18th or early 19th century for Ivan Kapistran I Adamović. The protected manor and its park are located in central Tenja, and the building is now used by Tenja Primary School.

Further Serbian settlement took place in Tenja after the First World War.

=== Second World War ===
In 1941, mass religious conversions from Serbian Orthodoxy to Roman Catholicism took place in Tenja. A total of 2,500 conversions were recorded.

In 1942, the authorities of the Independent State of Croatia established a Jewish settlement on the boundary between Osijek and Tenja for Jews from Osijek and the surrounding area. Built using forced labour, the settlement developed into a concentration and transit camp. Around 2,000 Jews from Osijek were interned there in June 1942, followed by Jews from other towns in the region. In August, the prisoners were deported, primarily to Auschwitz and Jasenovac.

=== Post-war period ===
In the immediate aftermath of the Second World War, the Tenja/Tenjska Mitnica labour camp near Osijek initially held German prisoners of war and was later used to intern members of the ethnic German minority (Volksdeutsche). It operated as an internment camp for Volksdeutsche from August 1946 until January 1947.

In the following decades, settlers arrived in Tenja from Bosnia and Herzegovina and from the Croatian regions of Lika, Banija and Kordun.

=== Croatian War of Independence ===
During the Croatian War of Independence, Tenja came under the control of Serbian paramilitary forces in 1991.

Between July and November 1991, at least 29 non-Serb civilians were killed in Tenja, while 2,961 Croatian nationals and other non-Serbs were forced to leave the Tenja area.

=== UNTAES and reintegration ===
From 1996 to 1998, Tenja was administered by the United Nations Transitional Administration for Eastern Slavonia, Baranja and Western Sirmium (UNTAES). In January 1997, the Transitional Administrator established the Transitional Municipality of Tenja for a one-year period.

== Demographics ==
Tenja had 7,663 inhabitants in the 1991 census. The population declined to 6,747 in 2001, increased to 7,376 in 2011, and fell to 6,260 in 2021.

== Economy ==
The Tenja business zone is located at the entrance to the village along the Osijek–Tenja road and covers approximately 6.63 hectares. The zone accommodates industrial, commercial, service and hospitality uses and is fully occupied.

== Education and culture ==
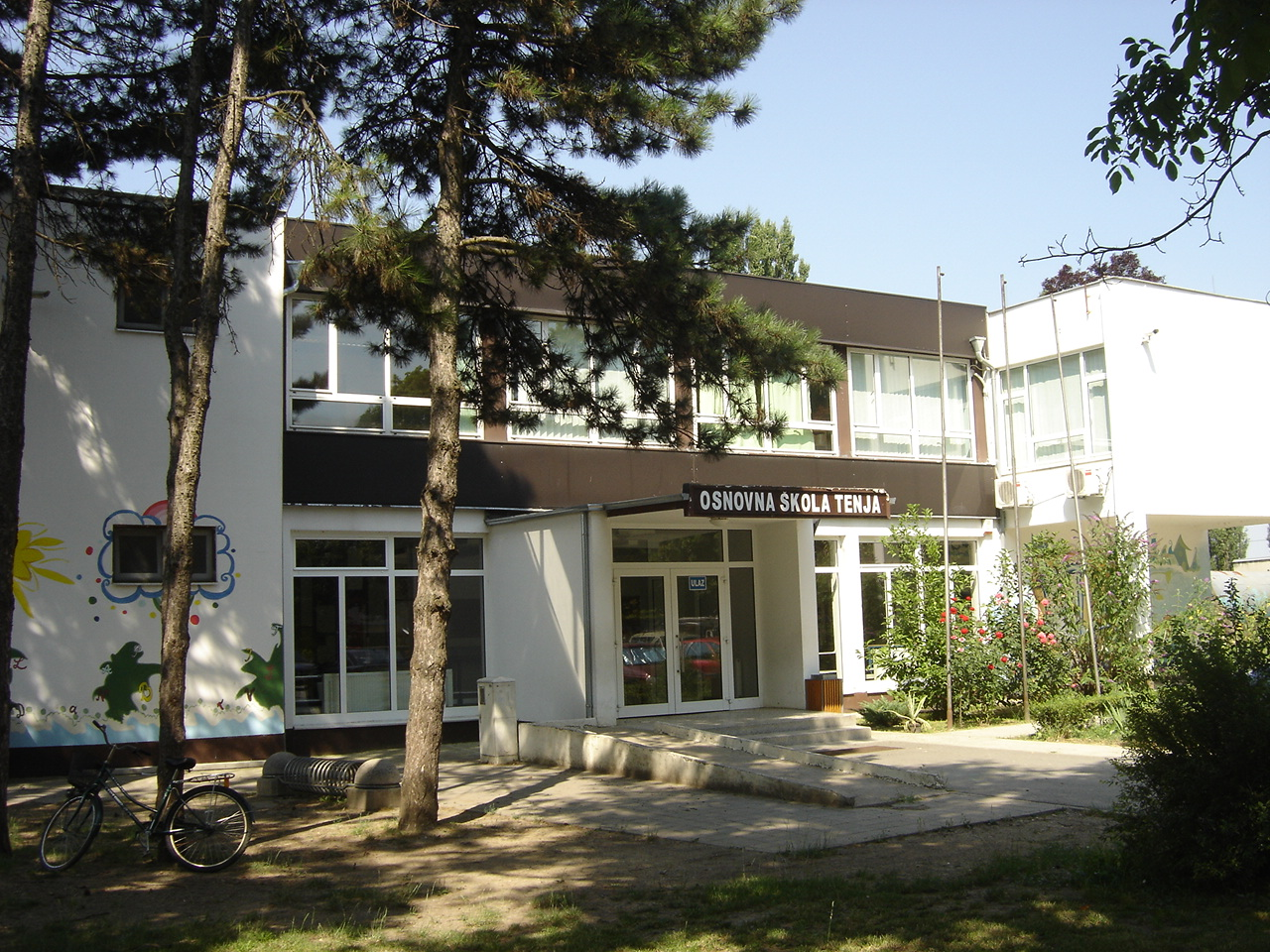
Osnovna škola Tenja

Tenja has a primary school, Osnovna škola Tenja, located at Svete Ane 2.

The Centre for Culture and Sport Tenja promotes cultural, traditional, sporting and community activities in the village. The cultural and artistic society Josip Šošić (Croatian: KUD "Josip Šošić") was founded in 2002 to preserve Slavonian traditions and organises local events including "Slavonijo, u jesen si zlatna" and Pokladno jahanje.

== Sport ==
Slavonac Tenja Football Club (Croatian: NK Slavonac Tenja) traces its origins to 1928, when the club TANK was founded in the village. The club later adopted its present name and uses the city-owned Tenja Sports Centre.
