= Podrinje, Croatia =

Podrinje Подриње (Serbian)
- Village (Selo)
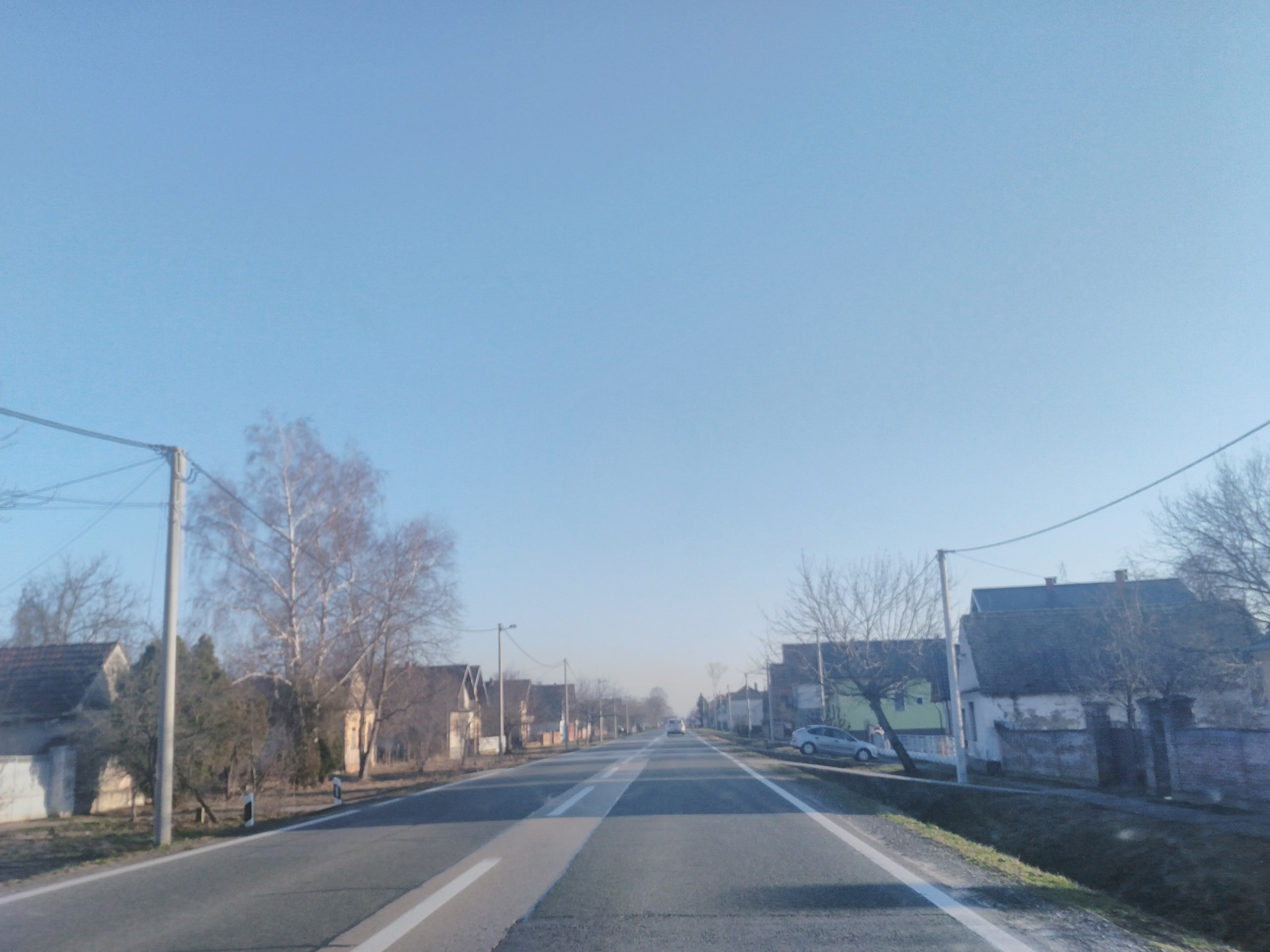

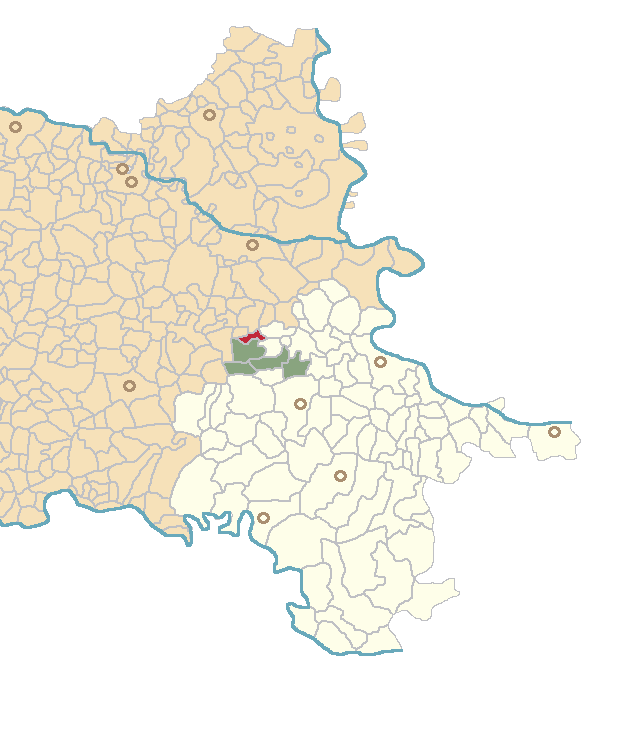

- Location within Vukovar-Syrmia County Location within Croatia Location within Europe
- Coordinates: 45°23′N 18°42′E
- Country: Croatia
- Region: Slavonia (Podunavlje)
- County: Vukovar-Syrmia
- Municipality: Markušica

Government
  - Body: Local Committee

Area
  - Total: 7.3 km^{2} (2.8 sq mi)

Population (2021)
  - Total: 143
  - Density: 20/km^{2} (51/sq mi)
- Demonym(s): Podrinjanin (♂) Podrinjanka (♀) (per grammatical gender)
- Time zone: UTC+1 (CET)
  - Summer (DST): UTC+2 (CEST)
- Vehicle registration: VK
- Official languages: Croatian, Serbian

Podrinje (Serbian Cyrillic: Подриње) is a village in Croatia, located in the municipality of Markušica. It is connected by the D518 highway.

A colonist settlement was established there in the course of the land reform in interwar Yugoslavia. According to the 1991 census, the village was inhabited by a majority of Serbs (94.33%), and minority of Croats (3%).
