= Karadžićevo =

Karadžićevo Караџићево (Serbian)
- Village (Selo)
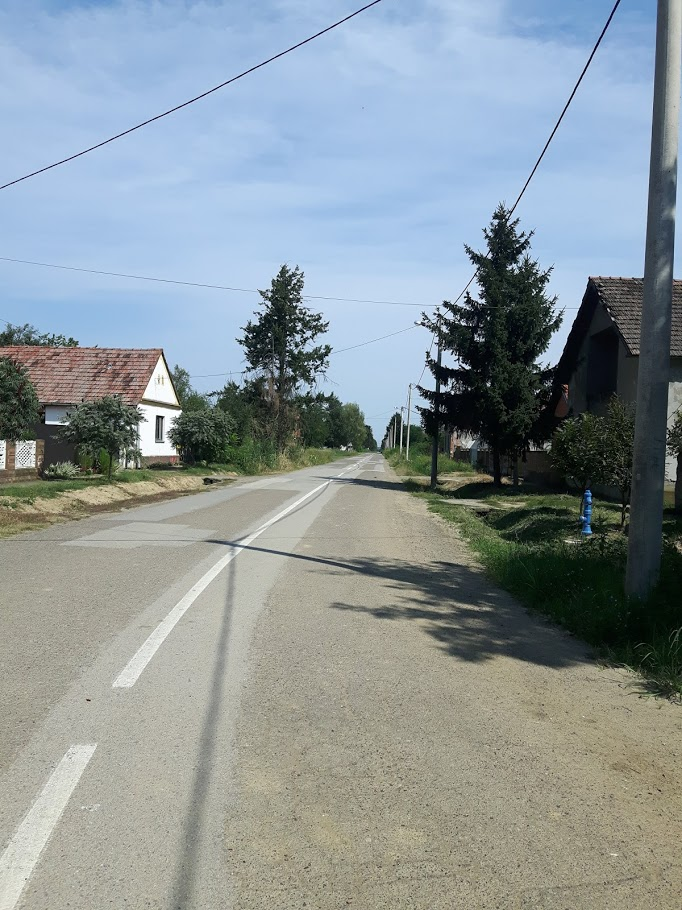

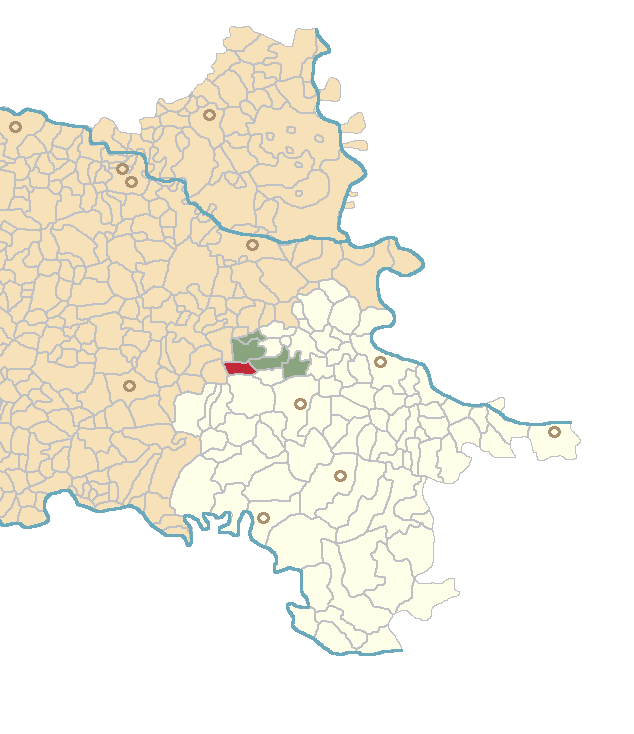

- Location within Vukovar-Syrmia County Location within Croatia Location within Europe
- Coordinates: 45.332436°N 18.685281°E
- Country: Croatia
- Region: Slavonia (Podunavlje)
- County: Vukovar-Syrmia
- Municipality: Markušica

Government
  - Body: Local Committee

Area
  - Total: 12.8 km^{2} (4.9 sq mi)

Population (2021)
  - Total: 126
  - Density: 9.84/km^{2} (25.5/sq mi)
- Demonym(s): Karadžićevčanin (♂) Karadžićevčanka (♀) (per grammatical gender)
- Time zone: UTC+1 (CET)
- Vehicle registration: VK
- Official languages: Croatian, Serbian

Karadžićevo (Serbian Cyrillic: Караџићево) is a village in Croatia, municipality Markušica, Vukovar-Syrmia County.

== History ==
Until 1920, the village was called Križevci. The settlement was originally a pustara, a Pannonian type of hamlet. A colonist settlement was established there in the course of the land reform in interwar Yugoslavia. Serbian volunteers settled the village and changed its name into Karadžićevo. The village was named after Vuk Karadzic. During the Croatian War of Independence, Karadžićevo was controlled by the self-proclaimed SAO Eastern Slavonia, Baranja and Western Syrmia. Croat special police stationed in Varaždin attacked the village which made it suffer major damage although the SAO won the battle.

== Demographic history ==
According to the 1991 census, the village was inhabited by a majority of Serbs (83.21%), and minority of Croats (14.59%).

== See also ==
- Markušica Municipality
