= Palača =

Palača Палача (Serbian)
- Village (Selo)
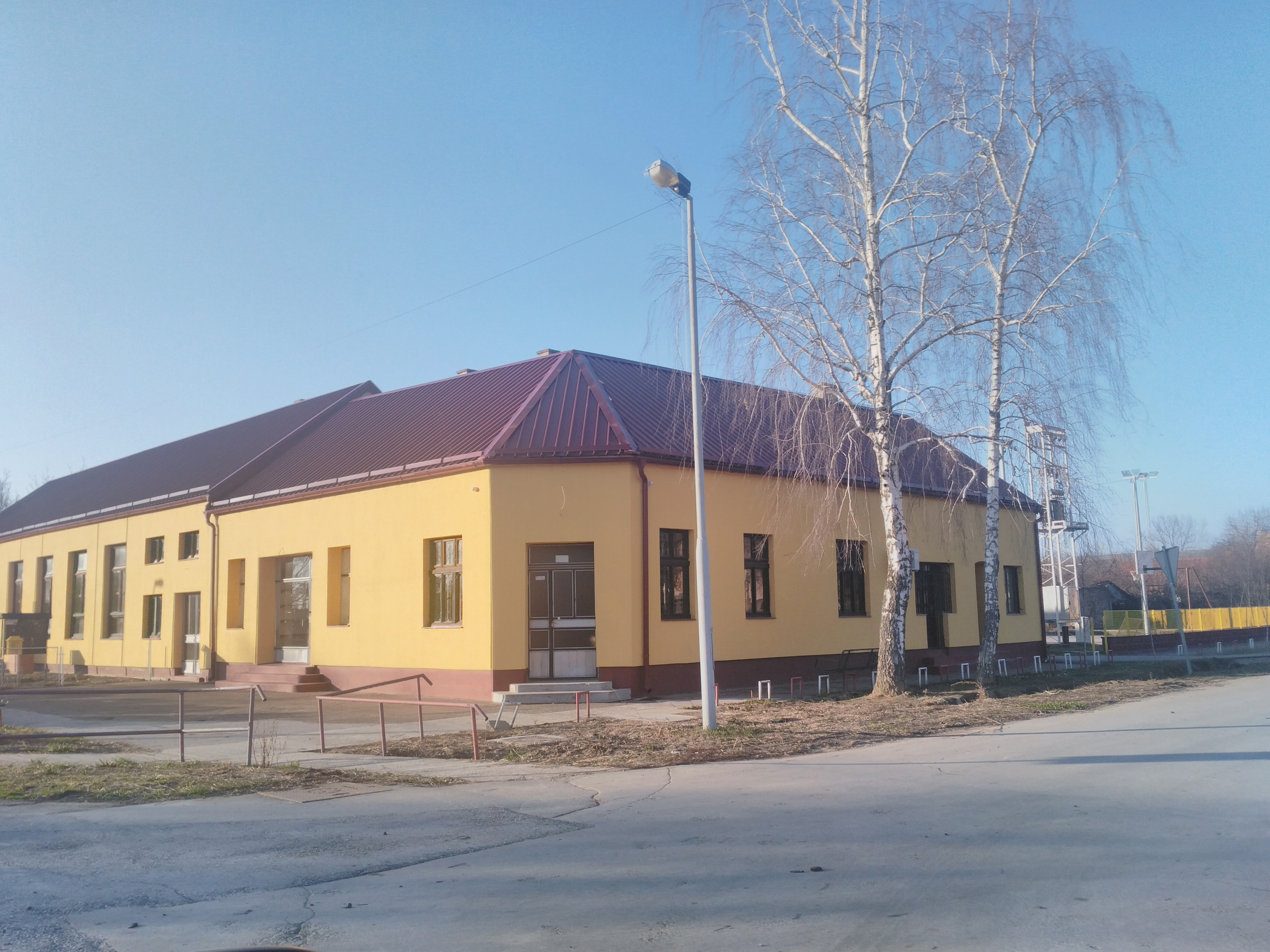

- Location within Osijek-Baranja County Location within Croatia Location within Europe
- Coordinates: 45°24′39″N 18°43′12″E
- Country: Croatia
- County: Osijek-Baranja
- Municipality: Šodolovci

Government
  - Body: Local Committee

Area
  - Total: 8.6 km^{2} (3.3 sq mi)

Population (2021)
  - Total: 169
  - Density: 20/km^{2} (51/sq mi)
- Time zone: UTC+1 (Central European Time)
- Official languages: Croatian, Serbian

Palača (Serbian: Палача), Hungarian: Palacsa) is a village in Osijek-Baranja County, Croatia. It is part of the Šodolovci municipality. The settlement was originally established as a pustara, a Pannonian type of hamlet.

== See also ==
- Šodolovci Municipality
