= Ada, Croatia =

Ada Ада (Serbian)
- Village (Selo)
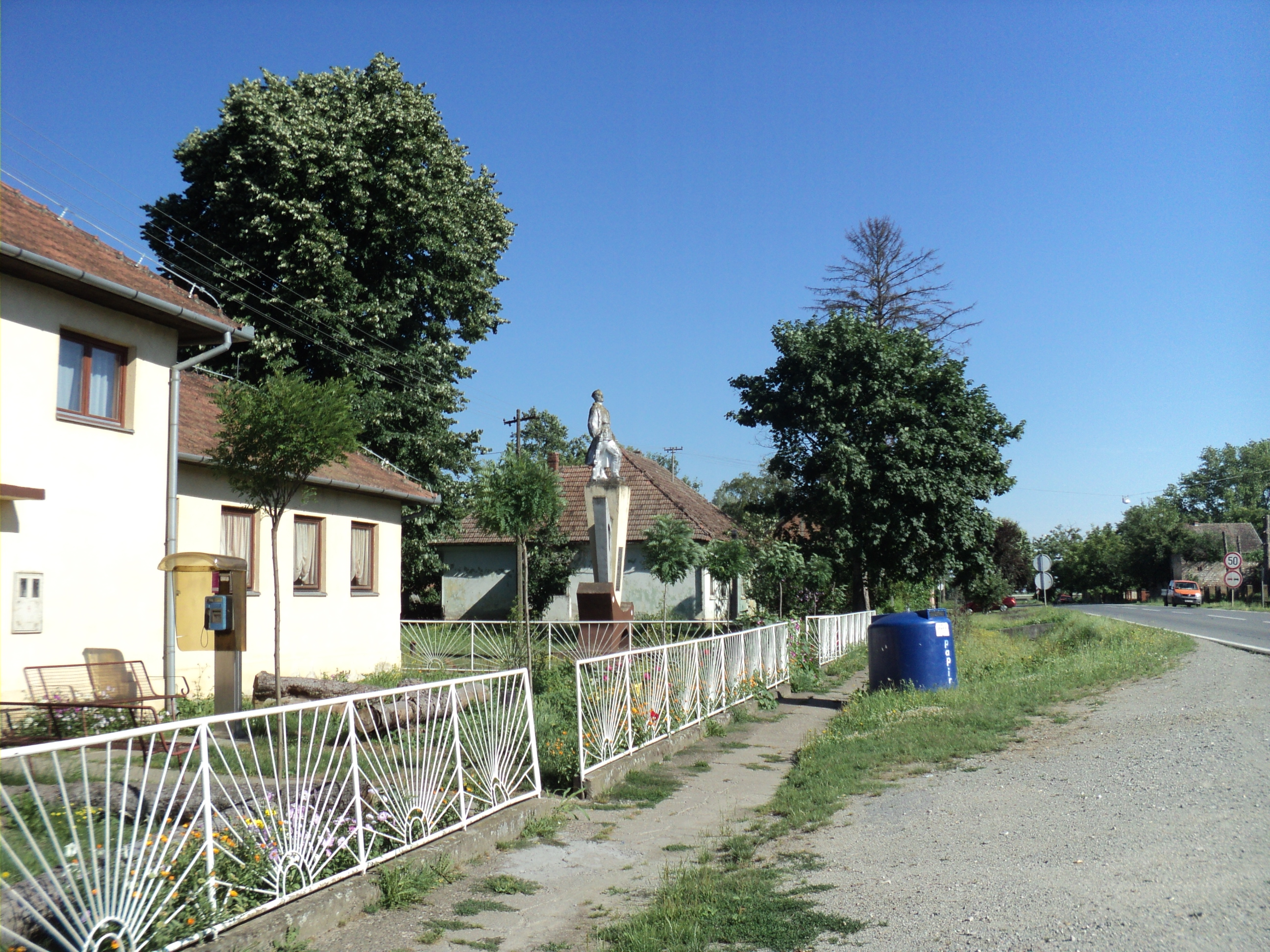

- Location within Osijek-Baranja County Location within Croatia Location within Europe
- Coordinates: 45.405658°N 18.68377°E
- Country: Croatia
- County: Osijek-Baranja
- Municipality: Šodolovci

Government
  - Body: Local Committee

Area
  - Total: 6.4 km^{2} (2.5 sq mi)

Population (2021)
  - Total: 142
  - Density: 22/km^{2} (57/sq mi)
- Time zone: UTC+1 (CET)
- Official languages: Croatian, Serbian

Ada (Serbian Cyrillic: Ада) is a village in Šodolovci, Osijek-Baranja County, Croatia. The settlement was originally a pustara, a Pannonian type of hamlet.

A colonist settlement was established there in the course of the land reform in interwar Yugoslavia.

It is connected by the D518 road.
