= Paulin Dvor massacre =

1991 mass murder in Paulin Dvor, Croatia

- Part of the Croatian War of Independence
- Paulin Dvor on the map of Croatia. Territories controlled by Serb or JNA forces in late December 1991 are highlighted in red.
- Location: 45.4431°N 18.6239°E; Paulin Dvor, Croatia
- Date: 11 December 1991
- Target: Croatian Serb villagers and one Hungarian national
- Deaths: 19
- Perpetrator: Croatian Army (HV)

The Paulin Dvor massacre was an act of mass murder committed by soldiers of the Croatian Army (HV) in the village of Paulin Dvor, near the town of Osijek on 11 December 1991 during the Croatian War of Independence. Of the nineteen victims, eighteen were ethnic Serbs, and one was a Hungarian national. The ages of the victims, eight women and eleven men, ranged from 41 to 85. Two former Croatian soldiers were convicted for their role in the killings and were sentenced to 15 and 11 years, respectively. In November 2010, Croatian President Ivo Josipović laid a wreath at the graveyard of the massacre victims and officially apologized for the killings.

== Background ==
In 1990, following the electoral defeat of the government of the Socialist Republic of Croatia by the pro-independence Croatian Democratic Union (HDZ), relations between ethnic Croats and Croatian Serbs deteriorated. In August 1990, an insurrection took place in Croatia centred in predominantly Serb-populated areas of the country. These Serb-inhabited areas were subsequently named SAO Krajina. After the Krajina declared its intention to integrate with Serbia, the Government of Croatia declared it to be a rebellion. This conflict escalated into the Croatian War of Independence by March 1991. In June 1991, Croatia declared its independence as Yugoslavia disintegrated. A three-month moratorium followed, after which the decision came into effect on 8 October.

The village of Paulin Dvor had a population of 168 prior to the war, 147 of whom were ethnic Serbs. The inhabitants of the village were known to support Croatian authorities in Zagreb.

== Massacre ==
On the night of 11 December 1991, Croatian troops entered the village. Nineteen people, eighteen Serbs and one Hungarian national, were detained in the house of a local man called Andrija Bukvić. Most of the village's 168 residents had already fled. The nineteen victims were detained because they were non-Croats. According to police investigators, the troops became enraged after a Croatian soldier was killed by a Serb sniper in a nearby village. Ten Croatian soldiers are said to have burst into the Bukvić house and murdered all of the detained individuals before destroying the home. The victims died of gunshot wounds and of injuries caused by the hand grenades that were hurled at them. Seventeen bodies were subsequently moved from the site of the killings. Only the body of Dara Vujanović, whose scalp had been removed, was left behind. The ages of the victims, eight women and eleven men, ranged from 41 to 85.

== Aftermath ==
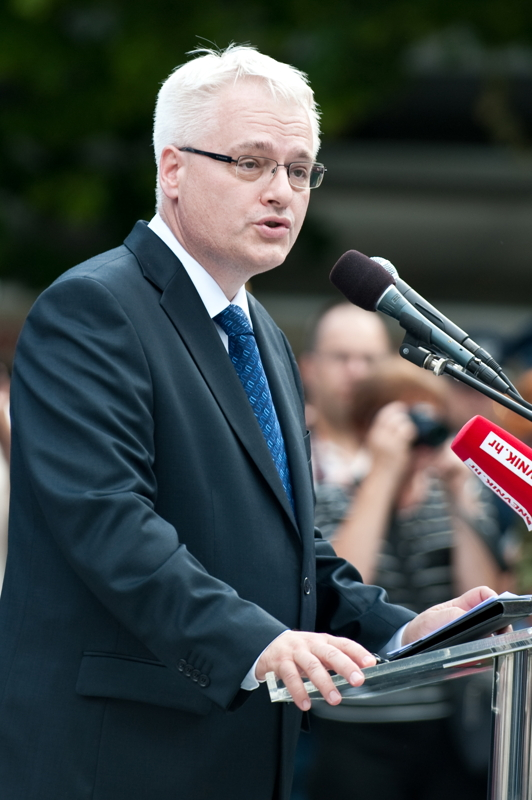
Croatian President Ivo Josipović apologized for the massacre in November 2010.

The victims of the massacre were first buried near a military warehouse in Lug, near the town of Čepin. The village of Paulin Dvor and its surroundings were seized by Yugoslav People's Army (JNA) units and Serb paramilitaries soon afterwards. The area remained outside of Croatian control until it was peacefully reintegrated into the country in January 1998. The remains of the massacred villagers were relocated to the village of Rizvanuša near Gospić in 1997 and remained there until 13 May 2002, when they were exhumed by investigators from the International Criminal Tribunal for the former Yugoslavia (ICTY).

In 2005, the Croatian Supreme Court sentenced Nikola Ivanković, a former soldier who served in the Croatian Army's 130th Brigade, to fifteen years in prison, while in May 2012 the District Court in the town of Osijek sentenced former Croatian soldier Enes Vitesković to eleven years in prison for his role in the deaths of eighteen people.

In November 2010, Croatian President Ivo Josipović laid a wreath at the graveyard of the massacre victims. He said, "those who are left behind those victims deserve our apology" and stated that "a crime has no justification; revenge cannot be justified by a crime." The wreath-laying ceremony came just after Serbian President Boris Tadić's visit to Vukovar to commemorate the Croatian victims of the 1991 Vukovar massacre. Part of the Croatian public saw the two visits as key to the reconciliation process, while another part condemned Josipović's comments as an attempt to belittle the Vukovar massacre and an attempt to "relativize the guilt for crimes committed during the war."
