= Petrova Slatina =

Petrova Slatina Петрова Слатина (Serbian)
- Village (Selo)
- Location within Osijek-Baranja County Location within Croatia Location within Europe
- Coordinates: 45°25′27″N 18°38′35″E
- Country: Croatia
- County: Osijek-Baranja
- Municipality: Šodolovci

Government
  - Body: Local Committee

Area
  - Total: 6.9 km^{2} (2.7 sq mi)

Population (2021)
  - Total: 150
  - Density: 22/km^{2} (56/sq mi)
- Time zone: UTC+1 (Central European Time)
- Official languages: Croatian, Serbian

Petrova Slatina (Serbian: Петрова Слатина) is a village in Osijek-Baranja County, Croatia. It is part of the Šodolovci municipality and it has a population of 209 (census 2011).

== See also ==
- Šodolovci Municipality
