= Paulin Dvor =

Paulin Dvor Паулин Двор (Serbian)
- Village (Selo)
- Location within Osijek-Baranja County Location within Croatia Location within Europe
- Coordinates: 45.4431°N 18.6239°E
- Country: Croatia
- County: Osijek-Baranja
- Municipality: Šodolovci

Government
  - Body: Local Committee

Area
  - Total: 9.7 km^{2} (3.7 sq mi)

Population (2021)
  - Total: 71
  - Density: 7.3/km^{2} (19/sq mi)
- Official languages: Croatian, Serbian

Paulin Dvor (Serbian Cyrillic: Паулин Двор) is a village in the municipality of Šodolovci, eastern Croatia, population 76 (census 2011).

== History ==
The village was established as a colonist settlement during the land reform in interwar Yugoslavia.

On 11 December 1991 during the Croatian War of Independence after the continuous bombardment by the JNA forces, soldiers of the Croatian Army committed Paulin Dvor massacre, an act of mass murder. Of the nineteen victims, eighteen were ethnic Serbs, and one was a Hungarian national. The ages of the victims ranged from 41 to 85, and eight of the nineteen victims were women. Two former Croatian soldiers were convicted for their role in the killings and were sentenced to 15 and 11 years, respectively. In November 2010, Croatian President Ivo Josipović laid a wreath at the graveyard of the massacre victims and officially apologized for the killings.
