= Laslovo =

Coordinates: 45°25′N 18°42′E

Laslovo Szentlászló (Hungarian)
- Village (Selo)
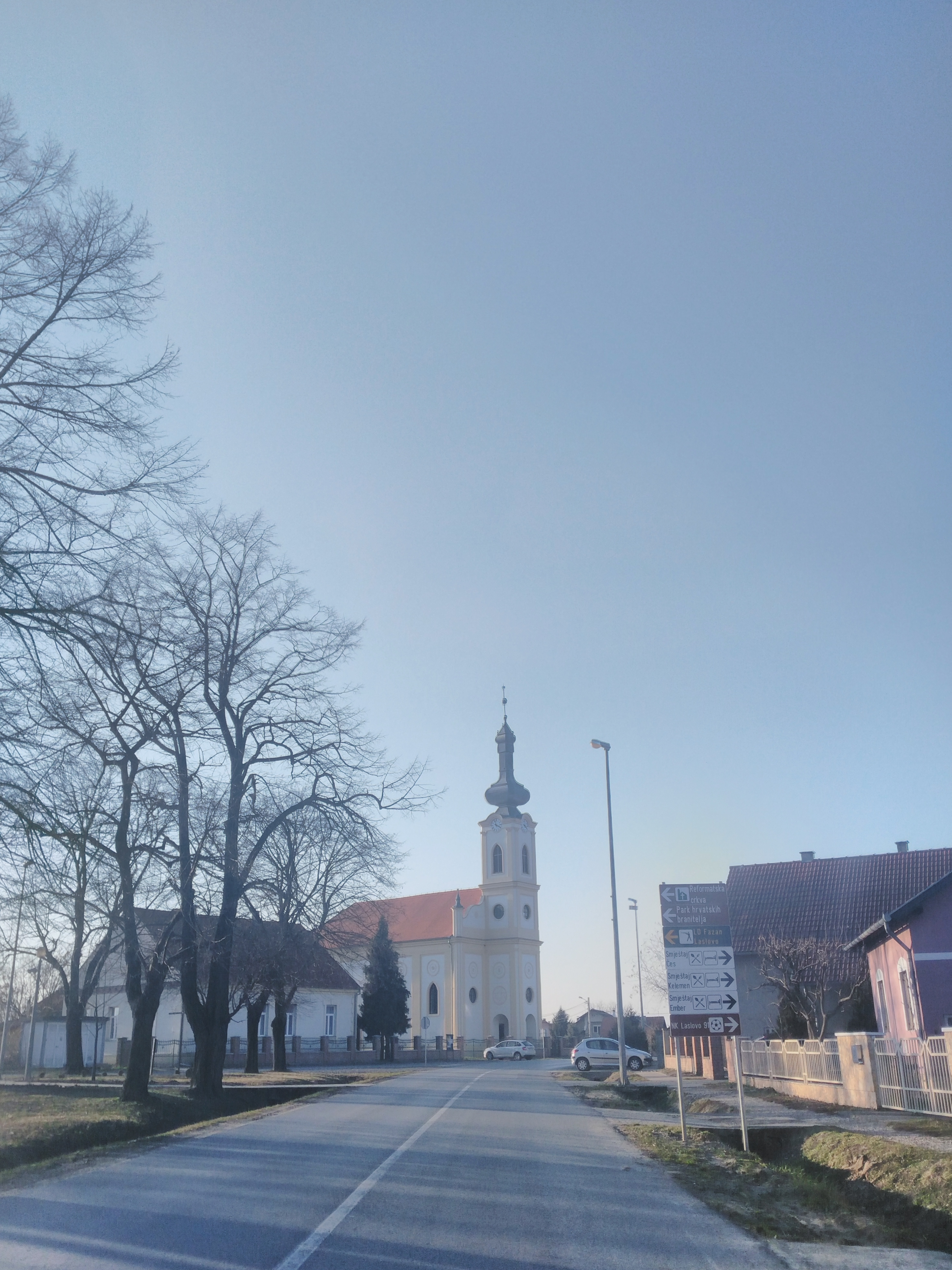
- Interactive map of Laslovo
- Country: Croatia
- County: Osijek-Baranja
- Municipality: Ernestinovo

Area
  - Total: 17.4 km^{2} (6.7 sq mi)

Population (2021)
  - Total: 898
  - Density: 51.6/km^{2} (134/sq mi)
- Time zone: UTC+1 (CET)
  - Summer (DST): UTC+2 (CEST)

Laslovo (Hungarian: Szentlászló) is a village in Croatia. It is connected by the D518 highway.

Laslovo is mentioned in historical documents in 1475 as a fortress. In Laslovo, the Calvinist church was built in 1404. In the first population census in 1697, after liberation from the Turks, Laslovo had 10 houses.

The village has a percentage of ethnic Hungarians among its population.

== History ==
Following Ottoman retreat from the region, the Lordship of Erdut was established in 1730, and the village became part of its domain.
