= Protestantism in Russia =

- Lutheran Church of St. Catherine in Vasileostrovsky District, Saint Petersburg, 1768–1771, a national cultural heritage monument
- Orientation: Evangelicalism (predominantly)
- Polity: Various
- Associations: Advisory Council of the Heads of Protestant Churches in Russia; Russian Evangelical Alliance
- Region: Russian Federation
- Origin: Since the 16th century
- Members: At least 1.5% of Russians (2 million)

Protestants in Russia constitute 1–2% (i.e. 1.5 million – 3 million adherents) of the overall population of the country. Additionally there are the Spiritual Christians, including around 15.000–20.000 Doukhobors and 40.000 Molokans in Russia, who have similarities to Protestantism. By 2004, there were 4,435 registered Protestant societies representing 21% of all registered religious organizations, which is second place after Eastern Orthodoxy. By contrast in 1992 the Protestants reportedly had 510 organizations in Russia.

Many missionaries operating in the country are from Protestant denominations. According to a global survey conducted at the end of 2013, 1% of surveyed Russians identify as Protestants.

== History ==
The Kirche Pörschken in New Moscow Village, Bagrationovsky District, Kaliningrad region, a former German Catholic and Lutheran church dating back to 1261—the oldest church in the country and a regional cultural heritage monument—the building is abandoned and falling into ruin.

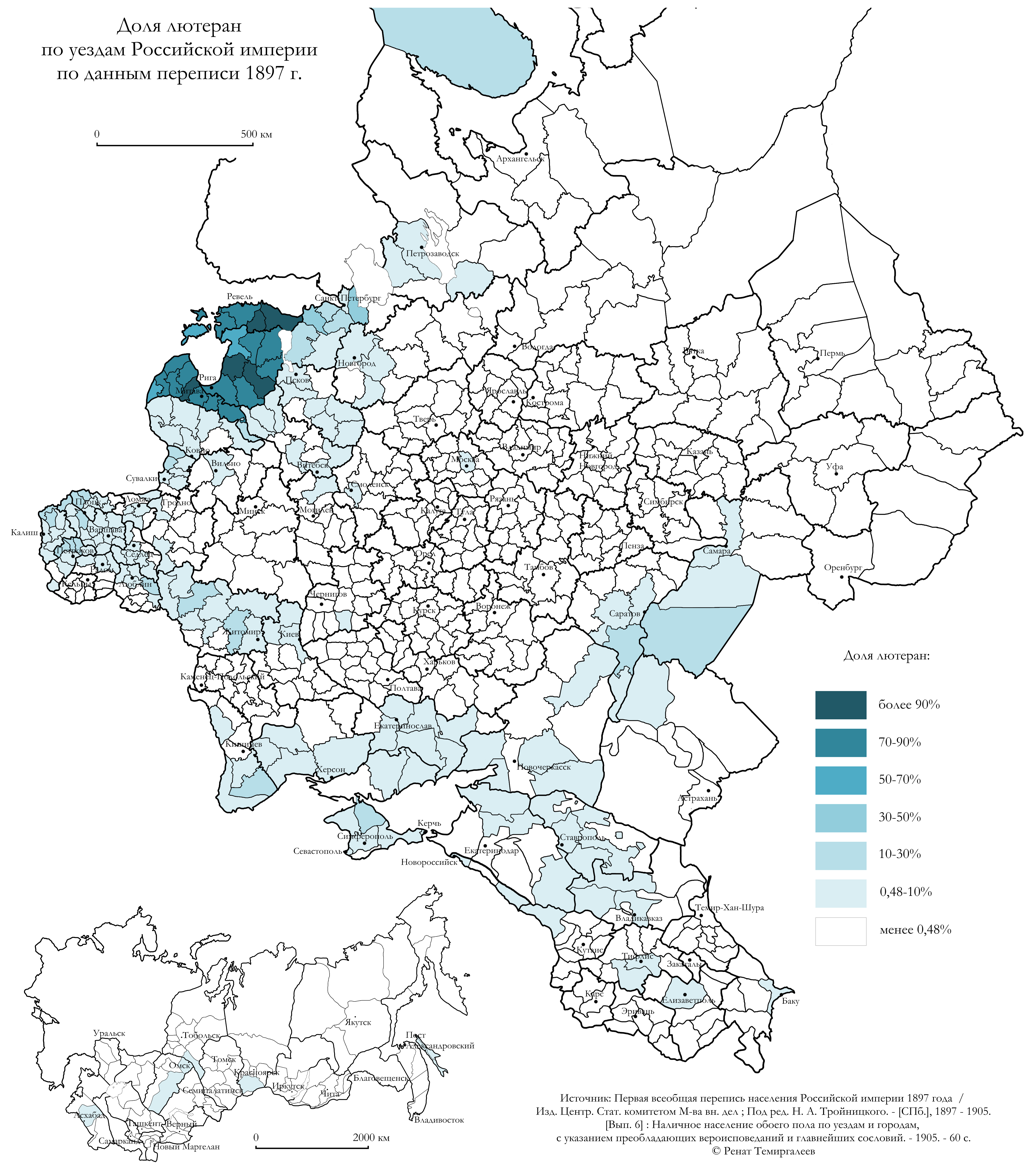
Share of Lutherans by uezds and districts of the Russian Empire, apart from Finland, according to the First General Census of 1897.

The first Protestant churches (Lutheran, Reformed, and to a lesser extent, Anglican) in the Tsardom of Russia appeared in the 16th and 17th centuries in major cities and international ports such as German Quarter at Moscow or Arkhangelsk in connection with expatriate communities from western Europe. The first permanent German-Lutheran congregation with own church building appeared in Moscow in 1576 and Reformed parish was opened in Tula in 1652. According to other sources, as early as 1560–1565, Tsar Ivan the Terrible authorized the construction of the first Moscow Lutheran church. A British trading post and an Anglican church were established in Arkhangelsk as early as the reign of Ivan the Terrible. Protestant foreigners were permitted to settle in Russia, practice their faith, and build churches—though without the right to preach to the local Orthodox population; in other words, they were treated better than Catholics and Russian sectarians. The Russian state preferred to recruit Protestants specifically from among foreigners. It is well known how Ivan the Terrible, who favored German culture, fined the Metropolite of Moscow for an offense committed against Germans. The only brief exception was the later Time of Troubles, characterized by strong Polish-Catholic influence and anti-Protestant policies. The Lutheran churches, in particular, represented a sizeable minority in pre-1917 Russia. Lutheranism was the largest officially recognized and state-supported Protestant denomination. Its adherents included career military officers, merchants, the technical intelligentsia, prosperous farmers, and even members of the high aristocracy related to the Imperial family.

The publication in 1702 of Peter the Great’s manifesto "On Inviting Foreigners to Russia"—which guaranteed freedom of religion for them, as well as Russia’s conquest of territories in the Baltic region and Finland—lands inhabited predominantly by Lutherans—necessitated specific state regulation of this denomination: on the one hand, granting it the firm legal status of a faith "under the Emperor's patronage" and even state support; on the other, imposing strict state control. Initially, in 1702, the Secret Collegium of the Military Council was established to serve as a judicial authority for foreign Christian denominations. In 1711, a non-state position of Superintendent was introduced (the first and only person to hold it was the pastor Bartold Vaget, 1656–1724). From 1727, the affairs of Lutherans—and from 1734, those of all Protestants—were administered by the particular Collegium of Justice for Livonian, Estonian, and Finnish Affairs until 1832, which took over the functions of the Secret Collegium after the latter could no longer cope with the growing Protestant population. While handling criminal-administrative, property, and family matters, as well as issuing certificates to pastors and resolving inter-congregational disputes, neither the Collegium of Justice nor its regional consistories interfered in the internal life of parishes, except in cases requiring arbitration. Later, in 1775, this body adopted a statute regulating pastors' obligations to the state.

Catherine II of Russia by Johann Baptist von Lampi the Elder. Herself born into a German Lutheran aristocratic family, she invited Germans, who often happened to be Protestant, to settle in Russia.

In the 18th century, Russian empresses of both Russian and German descent extended their patronage to the Lutheran community. For instance, Empress Anna provided the funds for the construction of St. Anne's Lutheran Church in St. Petersburg in 1735. Under Czarina Catherine II (the Great), large numbers of German settlers were invited to Russia by publishing two manifestos in 1762 and 1763, including Lutherans, Mennonites (also of Dutch origin), Lutherans, Reformed, the Herrnhuters (Moravian Brethren), as well as Roman Catholics. Those who went to Russia had special rights, such as being exempt from military service and others. At the same time, the enlightened Russian autocrats of the 18th century took extreme measures against Russians who had converted to Protestantism; for instance, in 1714, Foma Ivanov—a surgeon in a Streltsy regiment—was burned at the stake after refusing to renounce Calvinism and return to Orthodoxy.

In 1809, following the incorporation of Swedish Finland into Russia, the authorities established the Evangelical Lutheran Church of Finland, independent of the Church of Sweden. In 1818, modeled on the Prussian Union, a decree created a unified—yet unviable—"Evangelical Church" for all Protestants (apart from Finland and Poland), headed by a bishop. Finally, in 1832, in accordance with the Church Charter and the Instructions to the Clergy, the Emperor himself became the Superintendent of the Evangelical Lutheran Church of Russia, while the General Evangelical Lutheran Consistory was established in Saint Petersburg for direct administration, a partly state church in accordance to Sweden model, with Reformed parishes also placed under its jurisdiction. From 1817, the state body responsible for the administration of Protestant church affairs was the Third Division of the Ministry of Religious Affairs and Public Education; from 1832, this role was assumed by the Department of Spiritual Affairs of Foreign Confessions (i.e. non-Orthodox) within the Ministry of Internal Affairs. A privileged exception was made for Anglican, American, and Dutch churches in Russia, which operated under the patronage of their respective foreign embassies, regardless of their location. In 1896, the Statute on Spiritual Affairs of Foreign Confessions was enacted, regulating—among others—the activities of Lutherans, Reformed Christians, and Anglicans.

In the second half of the 19th century, the authorities adopted a starkly different, repressive policy toward evangelical free churches, such as Adventists, Baptists, Pashkovite Evangelical Christians, Plymouth Brethren, and Shtundists, that sought to foster Christian revival and preach among Russia's native population. Although the pioneers of the evangelical orientation were Pietist movements within Russian Lutheranism and Mennonitism—with both traditions experiencing a de facto split into high "Church" and evangelical "Brethren" factions, primarily among the peasantry. And Shtundists had roots in the work of the Swiss Pietist pastor Johannes Bonekemper within Jerman Lutherans of Novorossiya about Black Sea from 1832. From the 1880s to 1905 the Oberprocurator of the Holy Synod of the Russian Orthodox Church Konstantin Pobedonostsev oversaw systematic repression of them, including arrest, impresment, banishment (article 187 of the Criminal Code was applied, stipulating the deprivation of all civil and personal rights for leaving the church and joining another religious community), internal exile (article 196 prescribing exile to Siberia, Transcaucasia, or other remote locations for disseminating heretical or sectarian teachings or aiding in such activities), confiscation of property and the forcible separation of children from parents. Furthermore, the 1874 Military Service Statute extended the obligation of military service to foreign colonists—who had previously been exempt—prompting up to half of the Russian Mennonites and the entire community of Moravian Brethren to emigrate from Russia to the Americas due to their pacifist beliefs.

The first Russian Baptist communities arose, during the 1860s (or, according to some disputed accounts, as early as the 1850s), among unrelated groups, namely German Mennonite and Lutheran Pietist colonists in Novorossiya and other regions, exiled Russian Molokans in Transcaucasia, and Orthodox Ukrainian Shtundists. In 1867, Nikita Voronin (1840–1905) became first Russian adherent. In 1869, Johann Gerhard Oncken, a European Baptist leader made tour to Russia. The formally organized Baptist church was established in St. Petersburg in 1880. And in the 1880s one of first converts, Vasilii Pavlov (1854–1924) went to Hamburg, Germany, to study at Oncken's seminary. Despite persecution, the movement grew into a mass phenomenon, and in 1884, the Union of Russian Baptists of Southern Russia and Caucasus was formed. The Baptist movement flourished particularly among the Baltic Germans.

In the 1870s, the Plymouth Brethren began missionary work here. A key figure was the Lord Radstock, who arrived in St. Petersburg from England in 1874 and launched an active evangelistic campaign among the city's aristocracy. The resulting community became known as the "Pashkovites," named after their local leader, the guardian colonel Vasily Pashkov (1831–1902). Radstock was succeeded by the Swiss pastor Otto Stockmayer. In 1882–83, at the invitation of the Pashkovites, Radstock’s mentor—the Anglo-German missionary George Müller, a leader of the Open Brethren—preached in St. Petersburg; he baptized Vasily Pashkov, the princess Natalia Liven and several others in 1882. The activities of this essentially non-denominational movement came to be known as the "Peterburgian Revival" or Great Russian Awakening. In the early 20th century, under the leadership of Ivan Prokhanov, the movement evolved into a particular denomination known as the "Evangelical Christians," a group closely aligned with the General Baptists and not Plymouth Brethren.

Even less information is available regarding the activities of the Exclusive Brethren during the pre-1917 period (they were often grouped with the Shtundists). It is known that they originated in Germany. A collection of the Brethren's hymns has survived. The movement ceased to exist in Russia after 1917; only in Transcarpathia—a region later incorporated into the USSR—were there about 30 Brethren congregations.

Old Apostolics (a.k.a. Irvingites) established organized church congregations in St. Petersburg, Riga, and Reval. Representatives appeared in St. Petersburg in the late 1860s; General von Eberg served as a missionary there. The movement had between 100 and 200 adherents. The church gained legal recognition in 1905. Chapel services were conducted in German. The congregation was dissolved in the spring of 1933.

The history of Methodism in the Russian Empire began from the 1874 work of Swedish preachers in Finland. The first congregation was founded in the city of Nikolaistad (Vaasa) in 1880, followed by one in Gelsingfors (Helsinki) in 1884, and another in St. Petersburg in 1889 (primarily among Finns). In 1907, the Finland and St. Petersburg Mission was established under the leadership of George Simons of the Methodist Episcopal Church. A parish was officially registered in the Lithuanian region in 1906, and in 1909, the St. Petersburg Methodist community was formally constituted as the First Methodist Episcopal Church which opened its own house of prayer five years later, while officially a parish was established in Arensburg (Kuressaare) in Estonian region, in 1910. Both during and after World War I, Methodists—with American support—actively assisted the wounded and victims of the war. A broader initiative, independent of the aforementioned mission, was the work of the American Methodist Episcopal Mission to spread Methodism among Russian Koreans in the Far East; there, the Siberian Synod of the Methodist Church was established in 1921, uniting 107 congregations.

The first Seventh-day Adventists appeared in 1882 among the German Mennonites of Crimea and Novorossiya; the first foreign preacher was Karl L. R. Conradi. Several congregations were organized in 1886. The first general meeting of Adventists took place in the Caucasus in 1890, and the Eastern European Mission Field of the Seventh-day Adventist Church was established in 1891. Congregations emerged in new regions, including among ethnic Russians.

The Holiness movement was represented by the Church of God (Anderson, Indiana) and the Salvation Army. The Church of God established a missionary society in Riga in 1902 that specialized in preaching among Russian Germans. German-language literature was supplied by the church’s branch in Essen, Germany. Prior to the revolution, its activities extended beyond the Baltic region to the Volga area, southern Ukraine, and the Caucasus. During the 1920s and 1930s, the mission’s headquarters was located in Tbilisi. Following the 1941 deportation of Germans to Kazakhstan, the Altai region, and Siberia, charismatic cults spread among the believers.

The Salvation Army began its operations in the Russian Empire in Finland in the late 1880s, and in 1890, a Swedish missionary attempted to preach in St. Petersburg. In 1909, the movement's founder, William Booth, arrived in St. Petersburg and visited the country's parliament. A Russian-language magazine began publication in 1913, with its editorial office serving as a kind of prayer house. During World War I, the Salvation Army actively assisted Russian refugees. The Russian branch of the Salvation Army was officially opened on September 16, 1917. In addition to its congregations, the organization ran two orphanages, two shelters, and a home for the elderly. It underwent re-registration in 1922, but the authorities dissolved the organization the following year. It was not legalized again in the USSR until 1991.

In the spring of 1884, a congress was held in St. Petersburg bringing together Baptists, Evangelical Christians, Shtundists, neo-Molokan Zakharovites, and Brethren Mennonites; 70 delegates arrived from the regions (with a total of about 100 participants). Their aim was "to unite all believers in Russia so that they could get to know one another and subsequently work together." The congress was productive, and unity was achieved on many issues. However, on April 6 (the sixth day of proceedings), the visiting delegates were arrested and sent to the Peter and Paul Fortress. Vasily Pashkov and another leader of Evangelical Christians, Count and Courtier Modest Korf (1842–1933) were ordered to cease their religious activities. When they refused, both were ordered to leave Russia within two days.

It was not until April 17, 1905, that the Imperial Decree on Strengthening the Principles of Religious Tolerance was enacted and confirmed by the October Manifesto. This decree permitted individuals to "defect" from Orthodoxy to other Christian or non-Christian denominations. Legislative restrictions targeting non-Orthodox Christians—including all Protestants—were abolished. Such large movements as the Baptists, Evangelical Christians (particular denomination) and Adventists were finally able to register their unions—which had previously operated unofficially—namely, the Union of Evangelical Christian-Baptists (1905), the Russian Union of Seventh-day Adventist Church (1907), and the All-Russia Union of Evangelical Christians (1911). In 1908, the Russian Evangelical Union was registered—apparently as a national counterpart or branch of the World Evangelical Alliance—but the initiative failed to gain widespread support and eventually fizzled out.

Thomas Ball Barratt became the first Pentecostal preacher in the Russian Empire; in 1911, he visited Finland, including the Russian-speaking Evangelical Christian congregation in Helsinki, as well as St. Petersburg. A Pentecostal congregation was established in St. Petersburg in 1913, but under the influence of Andrew David Urshan, it adopted Oneness Pentecostalism as its confession and the name "Apostolic-spirit Evangelical Christians." Later in 1921, Ivan Voronaev, a missionary from the Assemblies of God, began his religious work in Odessa, Soviet Ukraine; it was this specific denomination of classical Pentecostalism that—particularly after merging with the Assemblies of God from Western Ukraine—became Pentecostal mainstream in the USSR and post-Soviet countries under the name "Christians of Evangelical Faith."

World War I brought new persecution of Russian Evangelicals due to government suspicions that they held pro-German sympathies. It was only after the democratic revolution of 1917 that the authorities fully rehabilitated the victims of religious repression from previous years. In May 1917, the mentioned Evangelical leader Ivan Prokhanov established the Christian-Democratic "Resurrection" Party and was elected into the State Duma.

In 1916, Quakers from Great Britain and the United States began aiding victims of World War I, and in 1921, they assisted those starving in the Volga region by establishing feeding centers, hospitals, orphanages, schools, and workshops. A Quaker office operated in Moscow from 1921 to 1931; during the Stalin era, it was the last foreign religious mission to be shut down.

After the 1917 Bolsheviks' Revolution, during the early Soviet 1920s, policy toward Protestant groups ("sectarians") was relatively benevolent: Protestant affairs were overseen by the Secretariat for Religious Affairs under the All-Russian Central Executive Committee, chaired by Pyotr Smidovich. Unlike the Orthodox Church, Protestant organizations were permitted to publish various periodicals and got new opportunities for missionary work, establish their own educational institutions, and organize youth unions; starting in late 1919, Protestant peasants began forming the first Evangelical agricultural communes and kolkhozes, which received state loans and benefits. Authorities did not hinder the state re-registration of pre-revolutionary Protestant associations or the registration of new ones as legal religious organizations. Major church bodies included: the Federal Baptist Union of the USSR; the All-Russian Union of Evangelical Christians; the All-Russian (Federal) Union of Seventh-day Adventists, founded in 1920 (known as the Federation of Seventh-day Adventists in the USSR from 1922); the Finnish Evangelical Lutheran Church of the North-West USSR (1923); the Supreme Church Council of the Evangelical Lutheran Church of the USSR with two bishops, which replaced the General Consistory in 1924; its congregationalist wing broke away from the Supreme Church Council, forming the Free Evangelical-Lutheran and Reformed Church of Congregational Order; and the All-Ukrainian Union of Christians of Evangelical Faith, established by Pentecostals in 1925. Churches began opening seminaries and publishing periodicals, such as the Lutheran Our Church. The number of Baptists and Evangelical Christians in Russia during this Golden Age significantly grew after World War I from 97.500 in 1912 up to 2 million by 1928; some Russian prisoners were converted by German missionaries and returned home to preach to others. The ban on the Salvation Army in 1923 serves as an example of the opposite. Yet even during this "Golden Age," there were Protestants who themselves refused any dealings with the Bolshevik authorities. In 1926, Heinrich Ostwald established and headed the Russian Field of the Seventh Day Adventist Reform Movement (based in Germany), and in 1936, the All-Russian Union of Adventist Reformers. Both he and his successor in the role were subjected to repression and perished in 1937 and 1949; Vladimir Shelkov then became the third leader, effectively breaking away from the reformist association to form his own dissident All-Union Church of True and Free Seventh-day Adventists.

Following the revolution, many Russian Protestants emigrated, leading to the emergence of Russian-speaking organizations and congregations abroad. One of the largest is the "Light in the East" Mission—a non-denominational organization founded in Germany in 1920 by two figures: Yakob Kroeker (1872–1948), a Russian Mennonite pastor and theologian, and Walter Jack (1878–1939), a German Reformed pastor who had long served in Russia. Originally established to preach the Gospel to Russian soldiers held in German captivity during World War I, the mission later ministered to Soviet prisoners and laborers during World War II and continues to provide spiritual and material support to ministers in Russia and abroad. In 1937, the World Union of Evangelical Christians was established in Berlin, based on congregations of Prokhanov-style Evangelical Christians in Germany, Estonia, Latvia, Romania, Manchuria, and the USA; its headquarters were initially in Estonia and later in Chicago.

With the establishment of Stalinism in the USSR, policy regarding religious associations of all kinds underwent a drastic shift. The decree issued by the All-Russian Central Executive Committee and the Council of People's Commissars of the RSFSR on April 8, 1929, "On Religious Associations," severely curtailed the rights of believers: "religious societies" were stripped of legal entity status, and not only the propagation of faith but also church-run charitable activities were banned, effectively limiting their operations to the holding of Sunday services. In the 1930s, Stalinist repressions against Christians rendered even the minimal rights guaranteed by the Soviet Constitution and the aforementioned decree a mere formality. Pastors and activists faced persecution; religious associations and Protestant congregations that had existed for decades were liquidated or effectively ceased to function; and church buildings were either blown up or nationalized. For instance, the oldest 1764 Lutheran church in Moscow—St. Michael's—was demolished. Believers from specific ethnic groups and regions were subjected to mass expulsion; examples include the deportations of Soviet Koreans (many of whom were Methodists and Presbyterians), Ingrian Finns, and Germans, as well as the deportation of Protestants and other Christians from the newly annexed territories of Western Ukraine, Western Belorussia, and the Baltic republics.

It was only during the Second World War that the country's leadership decided to permit the legal operation of church organizations, subject to certain restrictions and the requirement to cooperate with the authorities. The Protestant community benefited alongside their Russian Orthodox counterparts. The Evangelical Lutheran Church of Latvia, the Estonian Evangelical Lutheran Church, and the Estonian Methodist Church—which had emerged during the years of Latvian and Estonian independence—survived both the Soviet annexation of these republics and the extensive purges of the clergy. However, the Lutheran Russian Germans who had been deported were unable to re-establish their church during that period; from 1967, pastor Harald Kalniņš (1911–1997) of the Latvian Church began ministering to their congregations, and in 1980 he became the superintendent of the German congregations in the USSR. Similarly, Finnish congregations in Russia were only registered in the 1960s and 1970s as part of the Estonian Church. The Soviet state had co-established the All-Union Council of Evangelical Christians-Baptists (AUCECB) in October 1944; the authorities intended for all evangelical denominations—including Mennonites, Pentecostals, Transkarpattia's Plymouth Brethren, and Moravians from new territories—to join this body. In 1945, Adventists who refused to merge with the AUCECB succeeded in forming the Administrative Committee of the Federation (Division) of Seventh-day Adventists in the USSR. The Reformed Hungarians of Transcarpathia, who also refused to join the AUCECB, faced repression; nevertheless, the Reformed Church in Transcarpathia received official recognition in 1948.

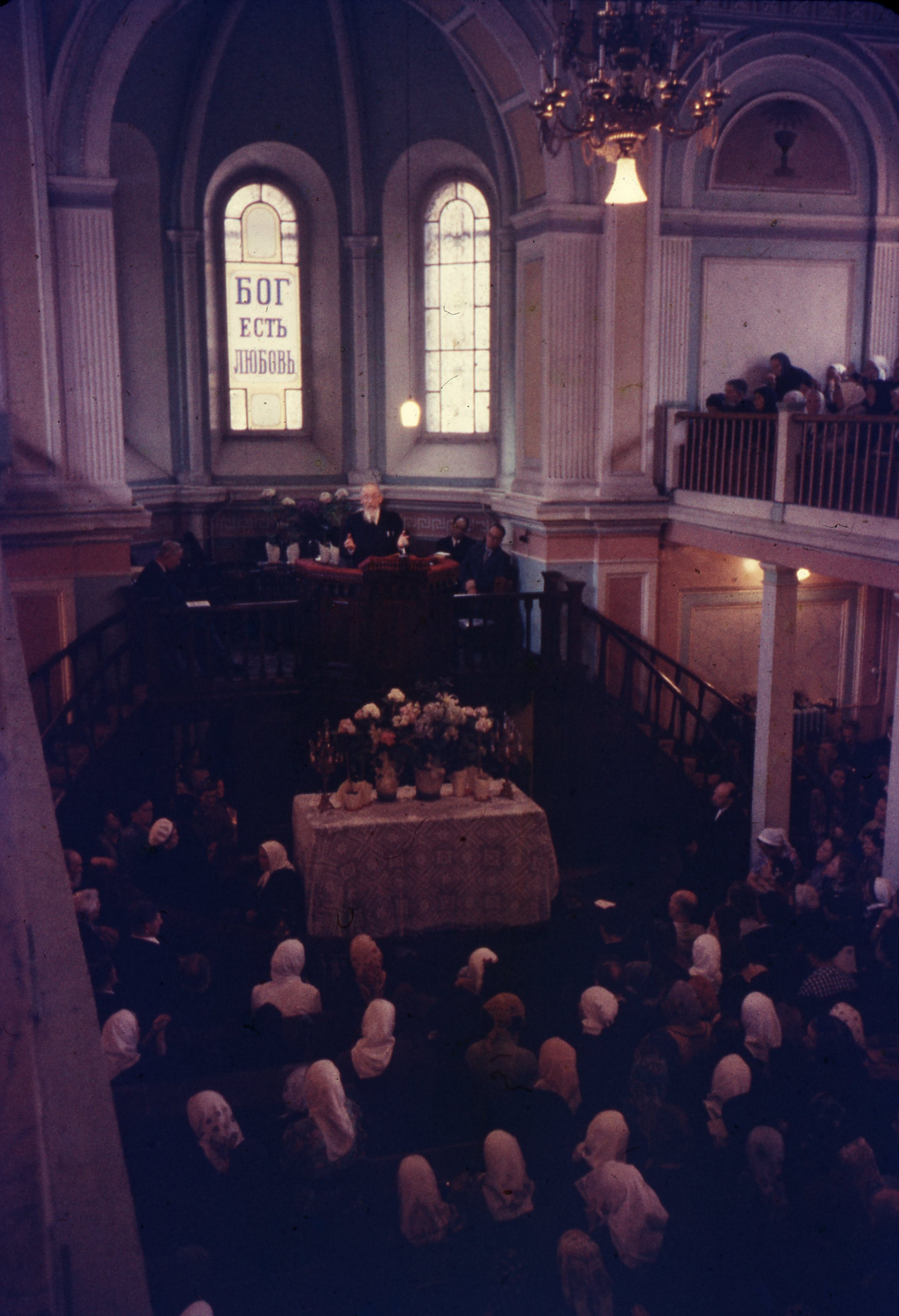
Inside the main Baptist church in Moscow during the Soviet era.

During the late Soviet era, the situation of Protestant churches did not undergo fundamental change. The USSR anti-religious campaign (1958–1964) was a period of intensified persecution (such as the 1960 dissolution of the centralized Adventist church), whereas the so-called "Era of Stagnation" saw some easing of restrictions—including the option for congregations to register autonomously without joining centralized church structures. Statistics provided by the leaders of the registered church suggest 250,000 baptised members in 1946 rising to 540,000 by 1958. In fact the influence of the Protestantism was much wider than these figures suggest: in addition to the existence of unregistered Baptist and Pentecostal groups, there were also thousands who attended worship without taking baptism. Many Baptist and Pentecostal congregations were in Ukraine. Women were almost as many as men in these congregations, though the pastors were male. In 1950s, some Christians were unhappy that church leaders were compliant with state anti-church policies, even collaborating with the state. Because of this, some started to express the view that the church should be separate from the influence of the state. Thus, in 1961, a new dissenter movement started, subsequently called the "Unregistered Baptists" (the Council of Churches of Evangelical Christians-Baptists).

Encouraged congregations to register, this did not signal the end to the persecution of Christians. Many leaders and ordinary believers of different Protestant communities fell victims to the persecution by Communist regime, including imprisonment. The leader of the True and Free Seventh-day Adventists dissident movement in the Soviet Union Vladimir Shelkov spent almost his entire life after 1931 in prison and died in a camp in Yakutia. Pentecostals were given 20–25 year prison terms en masse and many perished there, including one of the leaders of the movement, Ivan Voronaev. Protestant believers were forced into mental hospitals and endured trials and imprisonment (often for refusal to enter military service). Some were even deprived of their youth parental rights. Policy remained consistently repressive toward Protestant groups whose worship practices were deemed "fanatical" by Soviet "experts" (Pentecostals, especially the Sabbatarian Pentecostals and the Evangelical Christian Zionist Saints)—as well as toward movements that fundamentally refused registration and cooperation with the atheist authorities (Reform-Adventists, unregistered Baptists and Pentecostals, and Jehovah’s Witnesses). Believers were deported—often with their entire families—to Siberia for "special settlement" and administrative supervision (see, in particular, the October 6, 1952, memorandum from USSR Minister of State Security Semyon Ignatiev to the Central Committee of the Communist Party titled "On the Deportation of Socially Dangerous Elements"). Paradoxically, however, this only served to spread these movements—for instance, from Western Ukraine to the eastern parts of the country.

The years of perestroika—particularly following the adoption of the Soviet Russia Law of October 25, 1990, No. 267-I "On Freedom of Religion," the most liberal such law in Russian history—marked a period when believers were granted broad freedoms. Existing Protestant churches were revived, and missionaries from denominations new to Russia began to appear. For instance, the German Evangelical Lutheran Church in the Soviet Union—the future Evangelical Lutheran Church in Russia and the Other States (ELCROS)—was officially re-established in 1988 with the blessings of the Latvian Archbishop. The USSR Division of the Seventh-day Adventist Church was legalized and Pentecostals registered the Union of Christians of Evangelical Faith of the RSFSR.

The 1990s in post-communist Russia saw a boom in the number of registered Protestant congregations and their membership, as well as in church construction. Foreign missionaries had opportunities for evangelism. Many Russian pastors began receiving their education at seminaries abroad. In the early 1990s, when the country was gripped by food and financial crises, Protestant churches from the West sent significant humanitarian aid to people in Russia. With the collapse of the USSR, all-Union Protestant associations were transformed into national unions. At the same time, certain denominations established new regional fellowships across the post-Soviet space, such as the Euro-Asian Federation of Unions of Evangelical Christians-Baptists, the International Union of Churches of Evangelical Christians-Baptists (unregistered Baptists), the United Church of Christians of Evangelical Faith (unregistered Pentecostals), and the Federation of Evangelical Lutheran Churches in Russia and Other States.

However, even during this period, there was no genuine legal equality between Protestants and "traditional" faiths. For instance, regarding the restitution of previously nationalized church property, the large Reformed Church building in St. Petersburg and the oldest Lutheran St. Catherine's Church in Arkhangelsk were never returned; furthermore, through legal maneuvering, all Lutheran churches in the Kaliningrad region were transferred to the Orthodox Church. The 1997 new Federal "Law on Freedom of Conscience and Religious Associations," curtailed religious freedoms—specifically by complicating the registration process and requiring new denominations to prove they had been active for at least 15 years. Amendments to the law in 2016 (see Yarovaya law) introduced new restrictions on missionary work, stating that "missionary activity" may only be performed "without hindrance" at churches and other religious sites designated by the chapter. Missionary activities may only be performed by authorized members of registered religious groups and organizations. Foreign missionaries may only perform missionary activities after registering for a permit from a recognized religious organization.

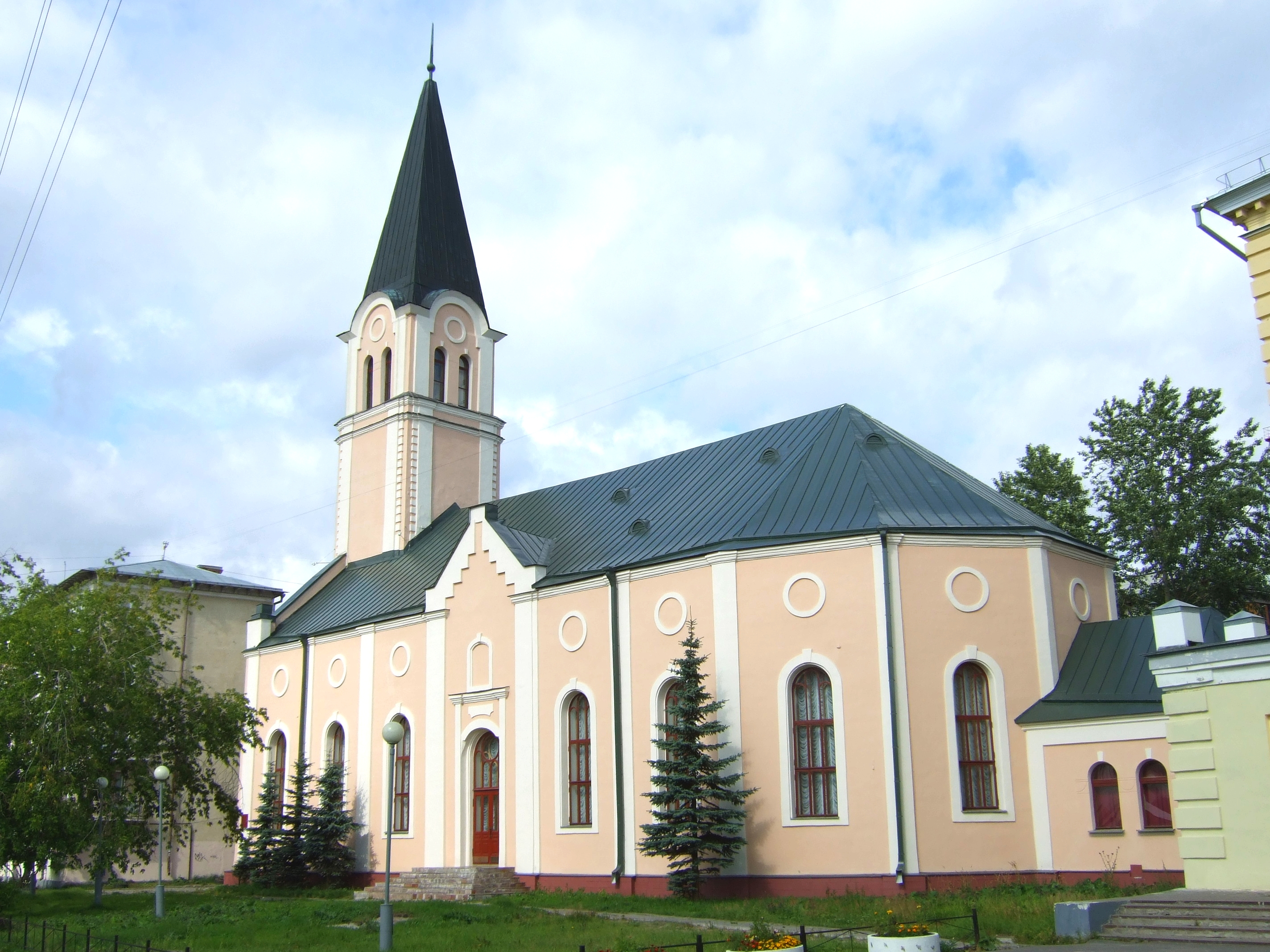
Former St. Catherine's Lutheran Church in Arkhangelsk (1768), the oldest surviving Protestant in Russia without Kaliningrad region (now the Pomorian State Philharmonia)

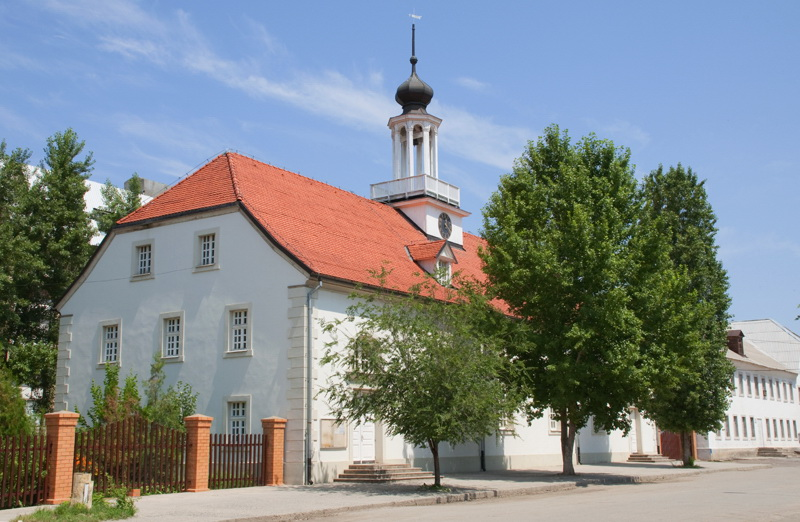
One of oldest active Protestant churches in Russia (1772), the Lutheran, previously Moravian, Kirche in Sarepta, Old Sarepta, Volgograd

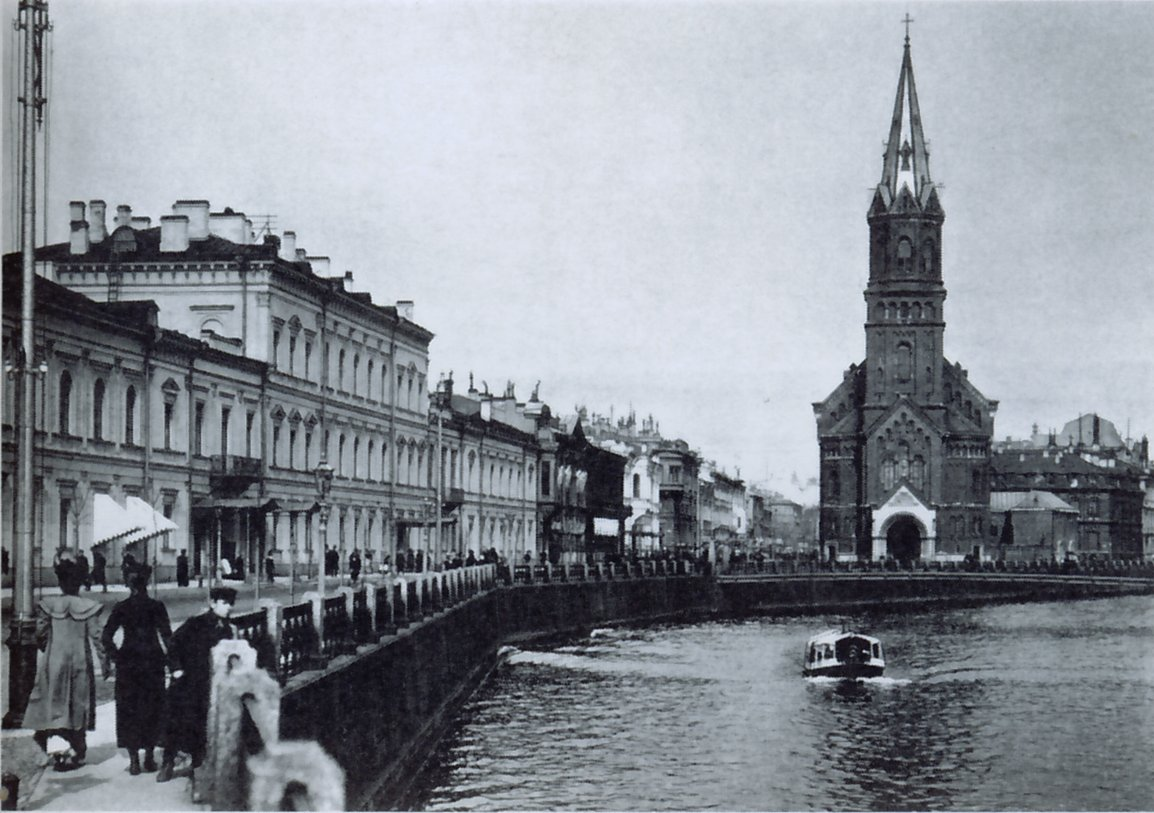
View of the Reformed Church in St. Petersburg (now the Palace of Culture for Communications Workers) in the 1890s

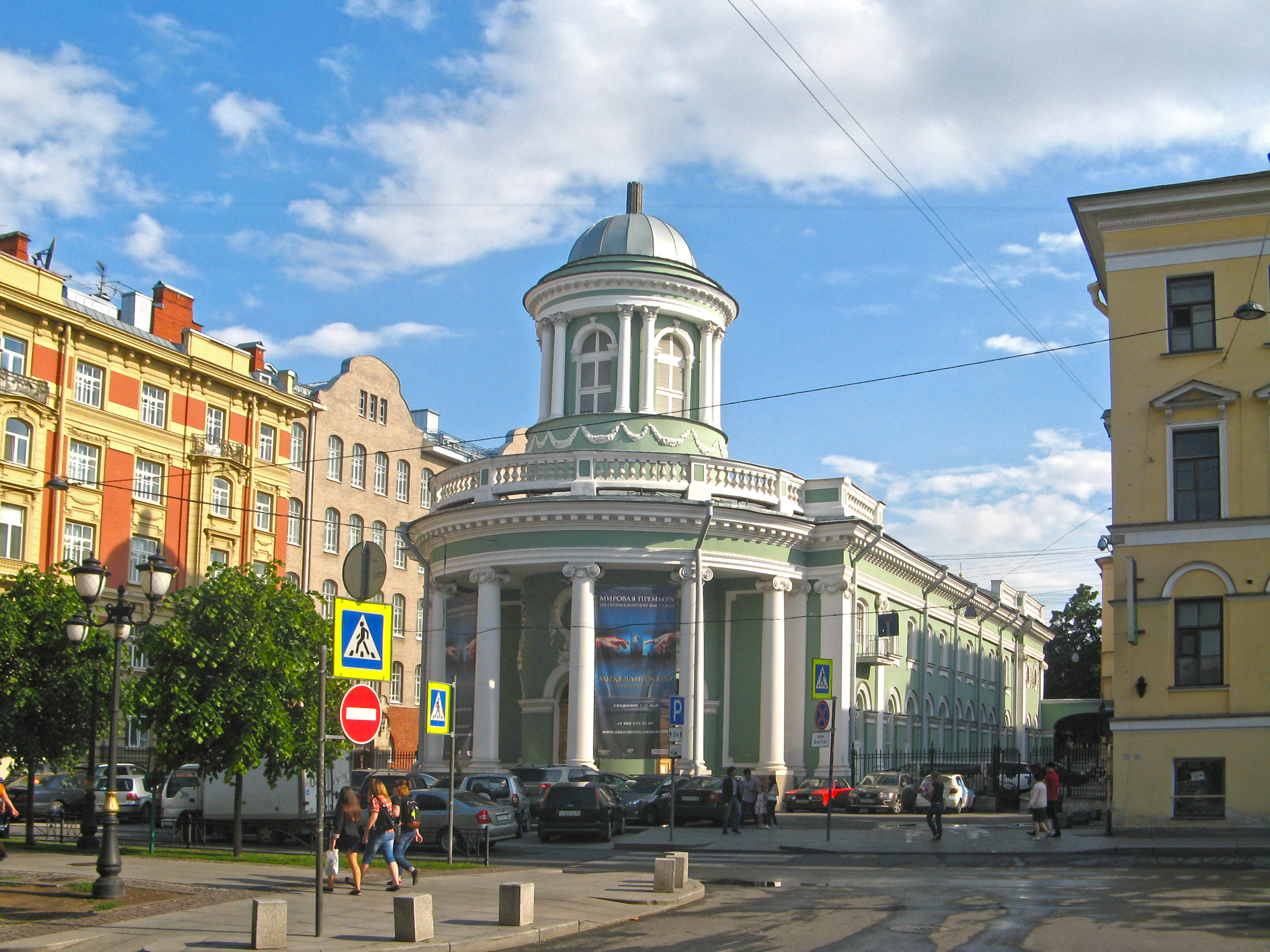
St. Anne Lutheran Church in St. Petersburg

=== Forerunners and local reform movements ===
The history of indigenous, Russian proto-Protestantism and evangelical Protestantism-like was anticipated by movements such as the Strigolniki in the 14th century and later in the 16th–18th centuries Spiritual Christian groups, such as the Doukhobors, Khlysts or Christ-faith Believers, most Protestant-like Molokans, to some extent, Subbotniks, and in 19th century Tolstoyan rural communes, who prepared the ground for the movement's future spread. The first evidence on some of the above communes' existence appeared in 16th — 17th centuries. Many of the above communities emigrated to Canada, the United States and Latin America in 19th and 20th centuries.

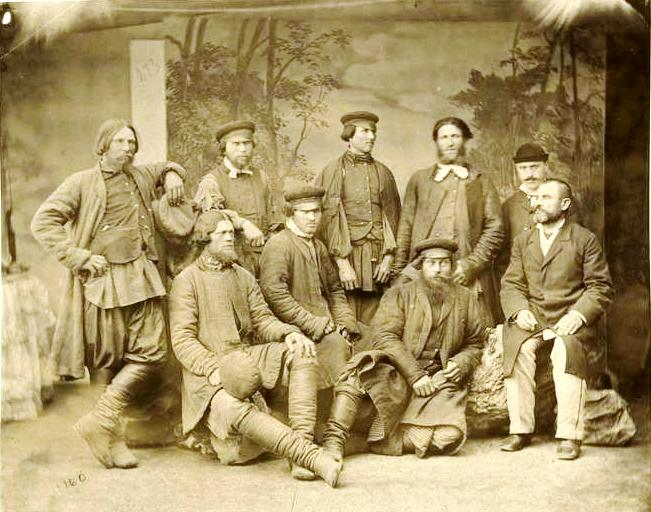
Molokan men, 1870s

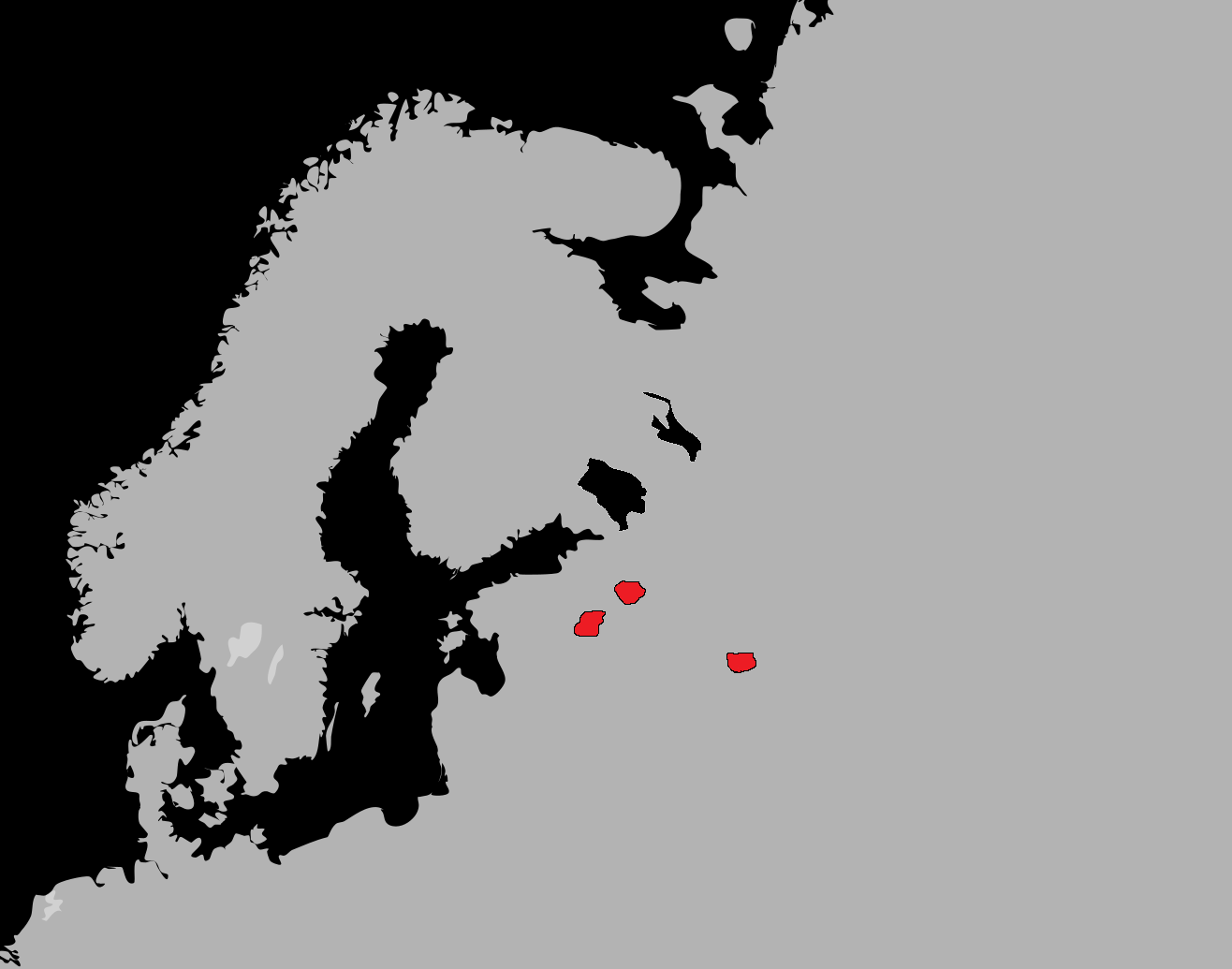
Spread of the Strigolniki

Former Molokan Prayer House in Rasskazovo

The Strigolniki were followers of a Russian religious sect in the middle of the 14th and first half of the 15th century, they had Iconoclastic tendencies and some proto-Protestant characteristics. According to Karetnikova, the Strigolniki were a response to changes in the Orthodox church, the Strigolniki wanted to return from ritualism to the simplicity of New Testament Christianity, emphasizing the spiritual meaning of the sacraments and basing their views on scripture. The Strigolniki opposed the Orthodox church, refusing to recognize its bishops and priests. Active participants of the sect were tradespeople and low-ranking clergy. They renounced all ecclesiastic hierarchy and monasticism, sacraments done by Orthodox clergy: priesthood, communion, penance, and baptism, which had been accompanied by large fees ("extortions", in their view) to the benefit of the clergy. Criticizing and exposing the venality, vices, and ignorance of the priests, the Strigolniki demanded the right to a religious sermon for laymen. Their sermons were full of social motifs: they reproached the rich for enslaving the free and the poor.

The Molokans had multiple Protestant-like aspects, they rejected the Orthodox priesthood, icons, had their own presbyters, they held the bible as their main guide and interpreted the sacraments "spiritually", being in many ways similar to the Quakers. The Molokans had multiple sects branched off them, including: Detei Khrista or Mokrye Molokane 'wet Molokans' were a Molokan group who practiced water baptism, the Sukhie Baptisty were Molokans who merged with Baptists, practicing spiritual baptism instead of water baptism, one congregation still exists in Georgia.

The Dukhobors additionally had multiple similarities to Anabaptists and mostly to the Quakers, for example by holding to pacifism. However the Dukhobors also have major differences from Anabaptists, especially by denying sola scriptura, instead believing in continual revelation. The Doukhobors have maintained close association with Mennonites and Quakers due to similar religious practices; all of these groups are collectively considered to be peace churches due to their belief in pacifism.

Late 19th-century Spiritual Christian denominations, such as the Neomolokans-Zakharovites and New Israel, came to bear a striking resemblance to Western evangelical churches.

== Present time ==
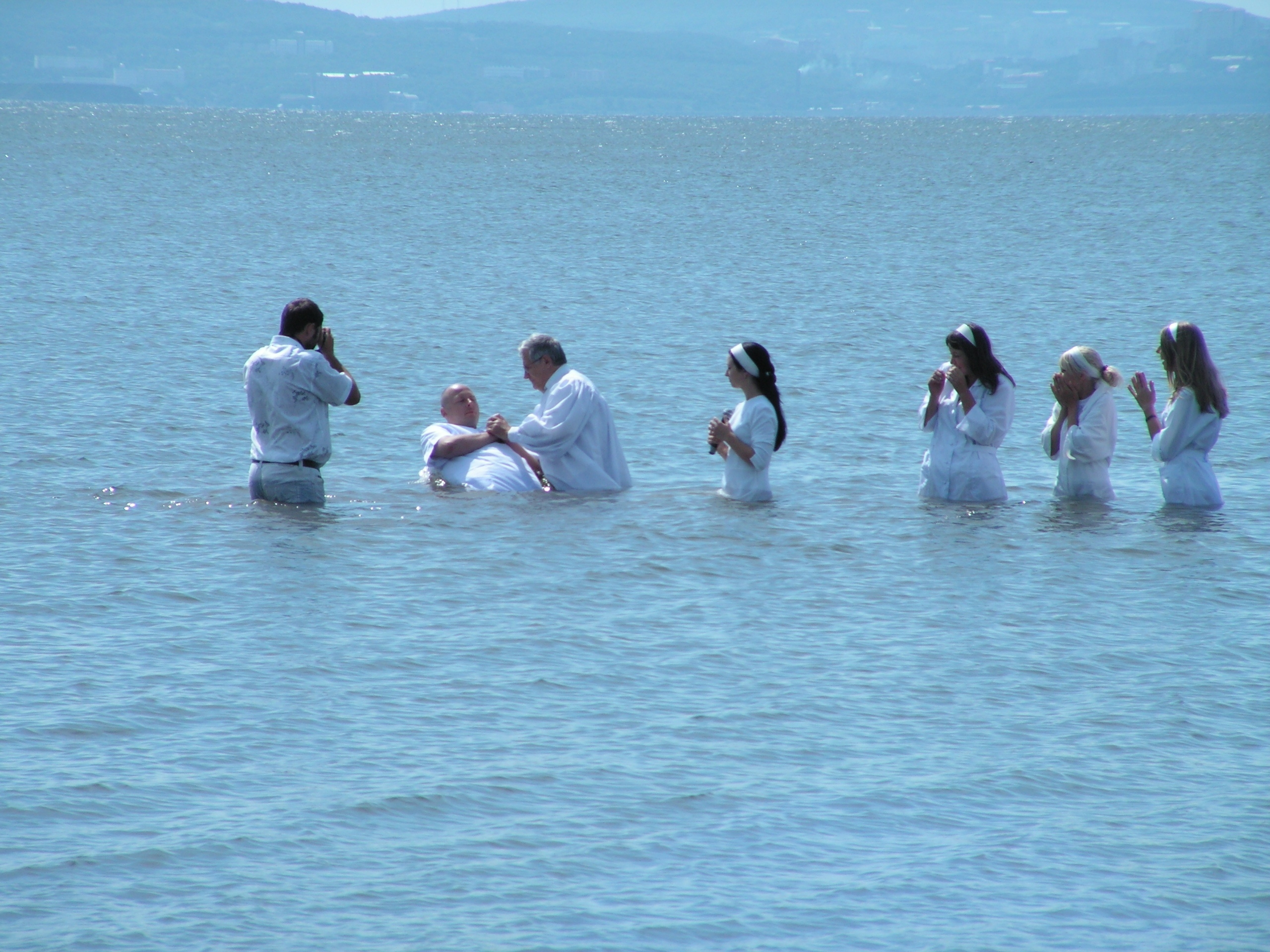
Russian Baptists, Vladivostok.

The major groupings of Protestants in Russia today are the Baptists (the Russian Union of Evangelical Christians-Baptists and the International Union of Churches of Evangelical Christians-Baptists or "Unregistered Baptists"), Evangelical Christians (particular denomination, the All-Russia Commonwealth of Evangelical Christians), Adventists (Seventh-day Adventist Church, most numerous, Seventh Day Adventist Reform Movement, True and Free Seventh-day Adventists, and Church of God (Seventh Day)), Russian Mennonites (of Duch and German origin), Lutherans, the New Apostolic Church, Reformed and Presbyterians (mainly of Korean origin), Methodists and Holiness movement (including The Salvation Army and the Church of the Nazarene), Anglicans, Quakers, Plymouth Brethren, Disciples of Christ, Christadelphians, Pentecostals and Charismatics. There is also Russia-origin Spiritual Christians. Virtually all Protestant denominational families are represented in the country.

Lutheranism in Russia is represented by the following churches. The largest are the Evangelical Lutheran Church of European Russia and the Evangelical Lutheran Church of the Urals, Siberia and the Far East (prior the German one, members of the Federation of Evangelical Lutheran Churches in Russia and Other States), and the Russian Lutheran Church (formerly known as the Evangelical Lutheran Church of Ingria). Confessional Lutheran bodies include the Siberian Evangelical Lutheran Church and the Evangelical Lutheran Church "Concord". There are also smaller groups, such as the Karelian Evangelical Lutheran Church and the Evangelical Lutheran Church of the Augsburg Confession. From 1991 to 1996, the ecumenical United Evangelical Lutheran Church of Russia also existed.

Brethren communities reappeared in Russia in the 1990s. In 1992, an American mission of the Open Brethren (associated with Witness Lee) opened in Moscow; although it failed to secure re-registration in 2000, it continues its missionary and humanitarian work in a number of cities across the country. The "Good News" mission of the Exclusive Brethren in Chuvashia was established through the efforts of a local former Baptist pastor and the German Brethren publishing house "Gute Botschaft Verlag." A distinctive feature of the mission is its publication of a magazine and other Christian literature in the Chuvash and Mari languages, enabling it to play a significant role in the revival of Christianity among the peoples of the Volga region.

Such Evangelical movement as Messianics has 400-member Shomer Yisrael congregation in Moscow and one more in Saint Petersburg.

While in 1991—the final year of the Soviet era—more than half of all Russian Protestants were Evangelical Christians-Baptists, in the early 21st century, more than half are Pentecostals (including neo-Charismatics). The number of Protestants grew sixfold during the post-Soviet period, peaking in the mid-2000s, after which their share of the Russian population began to decline. In 2008, Protestant churches accounted for 21% of all officially registered religious organizations. By this metric, Protestants rank second in the country—trailing only the Orthodox—while in the Far Eastern Federal District, they hold first place.

In 2002, such interfaith national association as the Advisory Council of the Heads of Protestant Churches in Russia was founded, and in 2003 the Russian Evangelical Alliance was re-established.

Positive examples of interaction between the Protestant community and the Russian authorities include the fact that each convocation of the Civic Chamber of the Russian Federation—an advisory body established by a 2005 law—includes a representative from Protestant churches. A relatively large number of Baptist, Pentecostal, and other prayer rooms have already been opened in places of imprisonment.

Some Protestants (especially at provincial level) report encountering obstruction by local authorities of their activities and government restrictions. In April 2007, the European Court of Human Rights obliged Russian state to pay EUR 10,000 (ten thousand euros) as a non-pecuniary damage for the refusal in registration of the Moscow branch of Salvation Army. In April 2017, the Supreme Court of Russia labeled Jehovah's Witnesses an extremist organization, banned its activities in Russia and issued an order to confiscate the organization's assets.

Since 2016, Russian Protestants face increased restrictions on public and private evangelism as a result of the Yarovaya law. According to experts, the law is likely to be interpreted in a way to block churches other than the Russian Orthodox Church from evangelizing ethnic Russians.

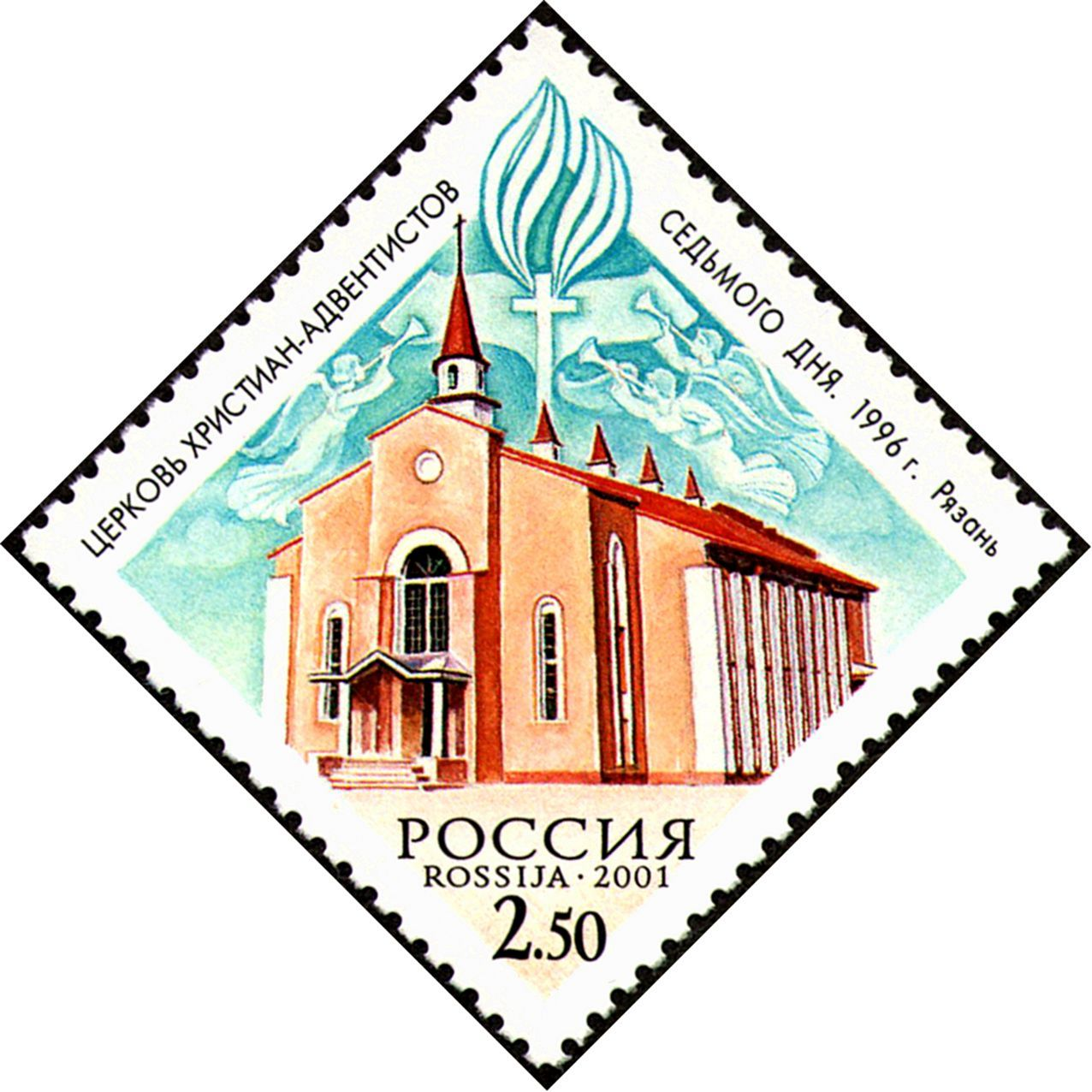
Stamp of Russia 2001 No 692. Seventh-day Adventist Church, 1996, Ryazan

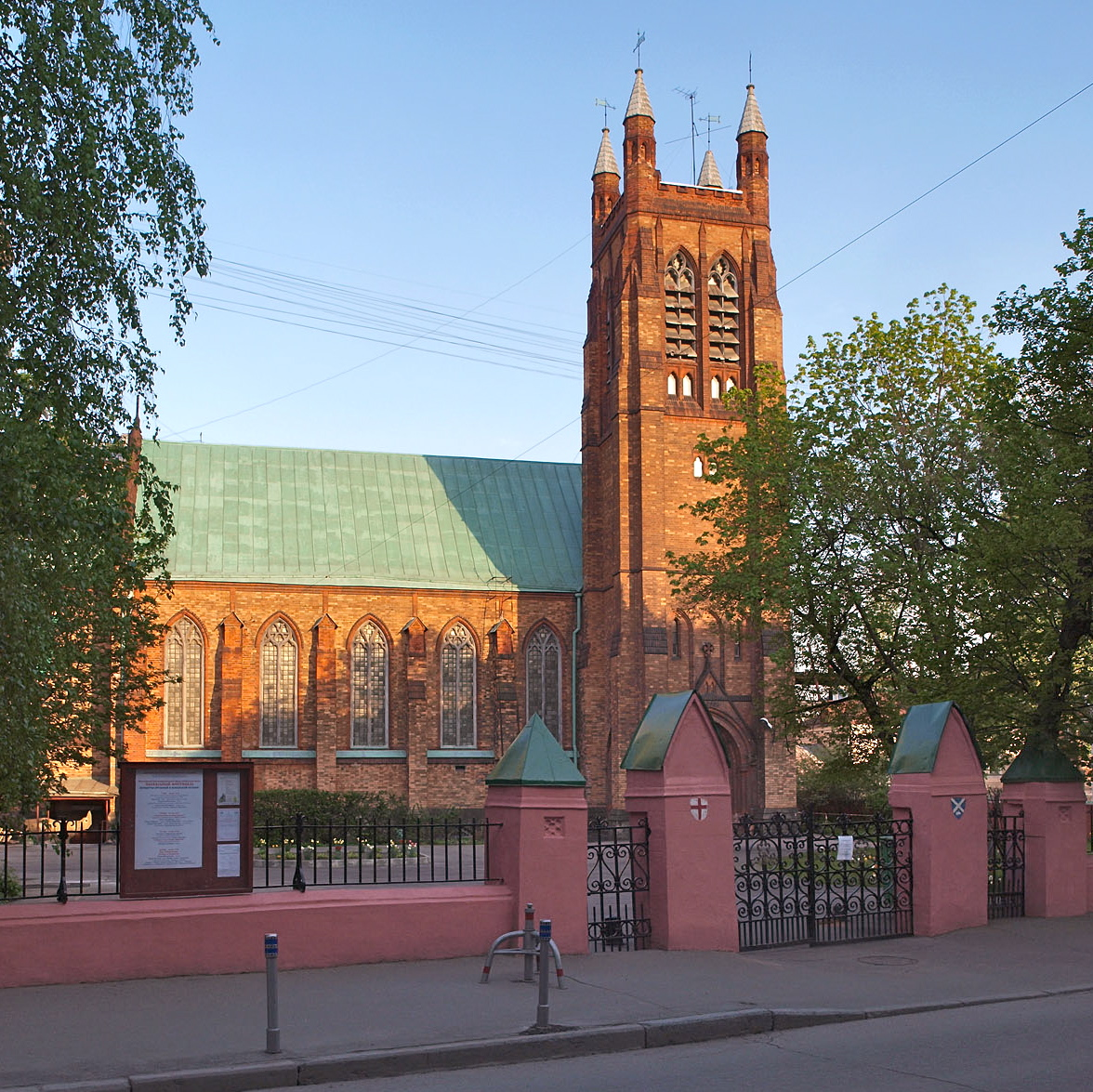
St. Andrew's Anglican Church, Moscow

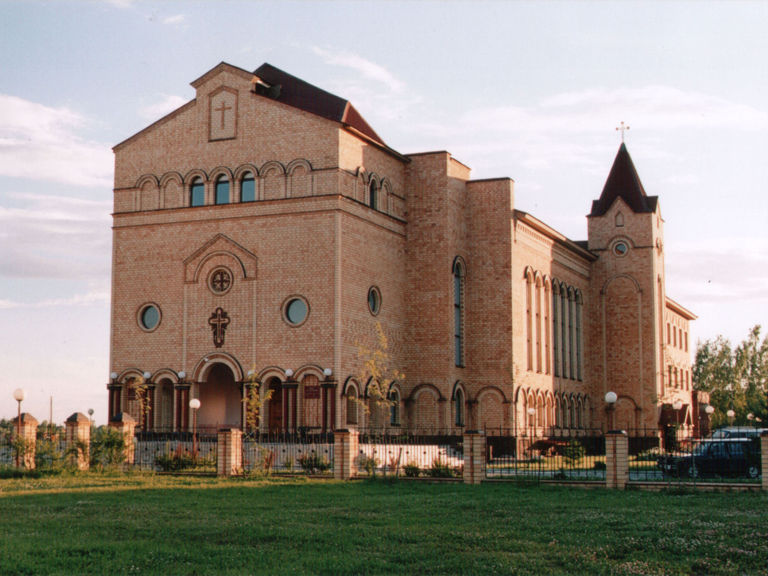
Baptist Church of Christ in Veliky Novgorod

Evangelical Church of Christ the Saviour in Tambov

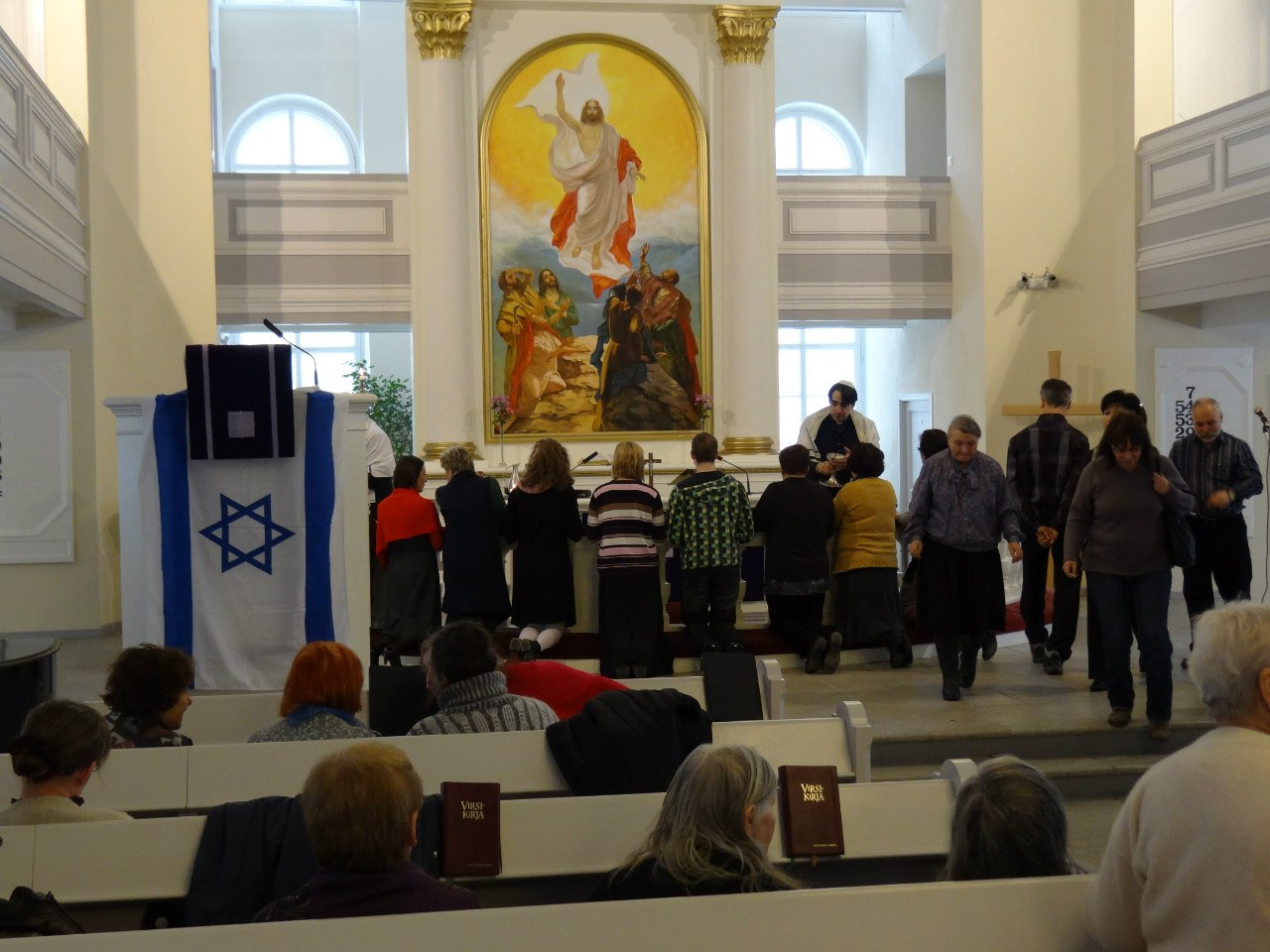
Purim of Messianic Jews in Saint Petersburg

=== Pentecostals and Charismatics ===
During the Soviet era, Pentecostal were forced to join the All-Union Council of Evangelical Christians-Baptists, while some unregistered congregations operated illegally. In the post-Soviet period, Pentecostals established independent associations.

Most Russian Pentecostals have roots in the Assemblies of God belief under the group name "Christians of Evangelical Faith." The Church of Apostolic-spirit Evangelical Christians (Oneness Pentecostal denomination) and the Evangelical Christians-Sabbatarians baptized by the Holy Spirit or Sabbatarian Pentecostals (Western Ukraine-origin particular denomination) are among the small religious movements. In the post-Soviet years, neo-Charismatic churches were added to their ranks.

In the 21st century, Pentecostals, Charismatics and neo-Charismatics account for more than half of all Russian Protestants. Their umbrella organizations are the "Russian Assemblies of God of Christians of Evangelical Faith (Pentecostals)," the "Russian Church of Christians of Evangelical Faith (Pentecostals)," the "United Church of Christians of Evangelical Faith" (its Russian division, an unregistered Pentecostals international association), and the predominantly neo-charismatic "Russian United Union of Christians of Evangelical Faith (Pentecostals)."

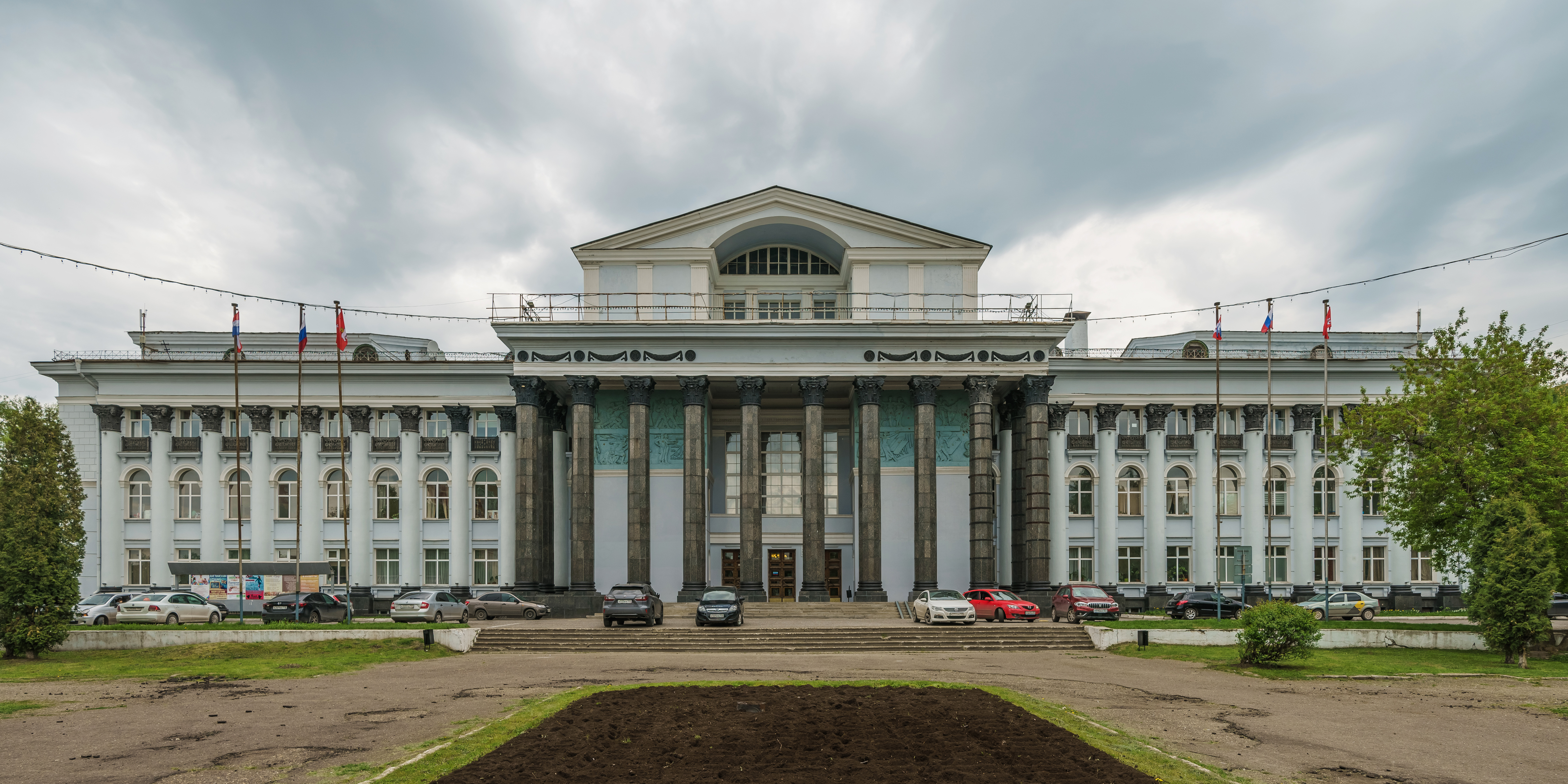
Largest in Russia, Pentecostal House of Prayer, formerly the Lenin Palace of Culture, Perm

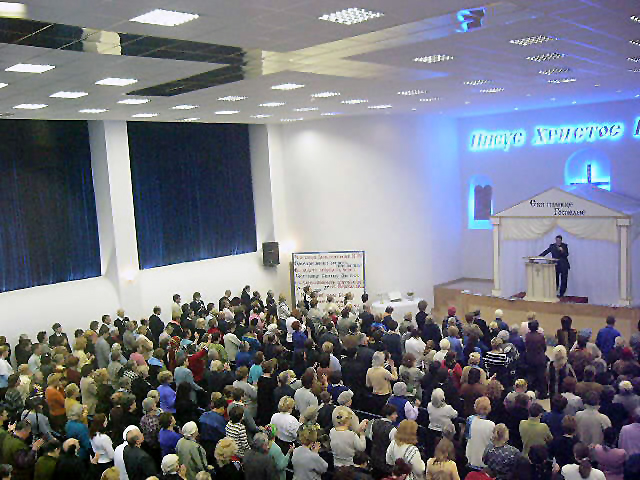
Universal Church of the Kingdom of God's service in Moscow

== Bible translation ==
The first attempts to translate the books of the Bible into the contemporary Russian language as an alternative to the older Church Slavonic, by that time used primarily in liturgical settings among Eastern Slavs, took place in the 16th and 17th centuries. But the mentioned works (by the deacon of Posolsky Prikaz Avraamiy Firsov, pastor E.Gluk, archbishop Methodiy (Smirnov)) were lost during political turbulence and wars.

The full-scale Bible translation into the Russian language began in 1813 after the establishment of the Russian Bible Society, a branch of the non-denominational British and Foreign Bible Society. The full edition of the Bible with the Old Testament and New Testament was published in 1876. This work, also called the Russian Synodal Bible, is widely used by Protestant communities all over Russia and the former USSR countries. Several modern translations have recently appeared. The Russian Bible Society since its establishment in 1813 and up to 1826 distributed more than 500 thousand copies of Bible related books in 41 languages in Russia. Several times in the 19th and 20th centuries the activities of the Society were stopped due to the reactionary policies of the Russian Government. The Russian Bible Society was reinstated in 1990–1991 after an interruption due to restrictions under the Soviet regime.

The opening ceremony of the Building of the Russian Bible Society in Moscow was attended by representatives of the Orthodox, Roman Catholic, and Protestant churches, who joined efforts in the cause of Bible translation and distribution. The publications by the Russian Bible Society are based on the shared doctrine of the early Christian church and include non-confessional commentary. Over 1,000,000 Bible-related books are printed every year. The Bible is also being translated into the native languages and dialects of Russia's ethnic groups.

== See also ==
- Christianity in Russia
- Slavic Christianity – Aspect of European history

== Bibliography ==
- Alakshin, Aleksandr (2007). "Взаимоотношения протестантов Петербурга с органами государственной власти в XVIII веке" [Relations between St. Petersburg Protestants and State Authorities in the 18th Century]. Bulletin of Chelyabinsk State University (in Russian) (3): 22–30.
- Alexeyeva, Lyudmila M. (1992). "Верные и свободные адвентисты седьмого дня" [True and Free Seventh-day Adventists]. История инакомыслия в СССР: Новейший период [The History of Dissent in the USSR: The Most Recent Period] (in Russian). Vilnius; Moscow: Vest‘. ISBN 5-89942-250-3.
- Baillie, Joy (2006). "Russia: Original Opening". In Merritt, John G. (ed.). Historical Dictionary of The Salvation Army. Historical Dictionaries of Religions, Philosophies, and Movements Series. Lanham, Md: Scarecrow Press. pp. 474–478. ISBN 9780810853447.
- Beliakova, Nadezhda; Dobson, Miriam (2016). "Protestant women in the late Soviet era: gender, authority, and dissent" (PDF). Canadian Slavonic Papers. 58 (2): 117–140. doi:10.1080/00085006.2016.1157923. S2CID 59040712.
- Beznosova, Oksana (December 2016). "The Perception in the Religious Space: The Assessment of the Impact of Western Reformation Ideas to Religious Movements of Russian-Ukrainian Steppe Borderlands in XVIII – The Early XIX Centuries". Procedia — Social and Behavioral Sciences. 236: 320–326. doi:10.1016/j.sbspro.2016.12.037. ISSN 1877-0428.
- Bourdeaux, Michael; Filatov, Sergei B., eds. (2003). Современная религиозная жизнь России. Опыт систематического описания [Contemporary religious life of Russia. Systematic description of experiences] (in Russian). Vol. 2: Protestantism. Keston Institute. Moscow: Logos. ISBN 5-94010-209-3.
- Burgess, Stanley M.; Maas, Eduard M. van der, eds. (2002). "Russia". The New International Dictionary of Pentecostal and Charismatic Movements (Rev. and exp. ed.). Grand Rapids, Mi: Zondervan. pp. 217–19. ISBN 978-0-310-22481-5.
- Chapnin, Sergei (2025). "Russian Federation". In Kenneth R. Ross; Marian Gh. Simion; Todd M. Johnson (eds.). Christianity in Eastern and Southern Europe. Edinburgh Companions to Glabal Christianity. Edinburgh University Press. ISBN 978-1-3995-4773-4.
- Coleman, Heather J. (2005). Russian Baptists and Spiritual Revolution, 1905–1929. Indiana-Michigan Series in Russian and East European Studies. Bloomington; Indianapolis: Indiana University Press. ISBN 0-253-34572-3.
- Curtis, Glenn E.; Leighton, Marian (1998). "Religion". In Curtis, Glenn E. (ed.). Russia: A Country Study. Area handbook series. Library of Congress, Federal Research Division (1st ed.). Washington, DC: U.S. Government Printing Office. pp. 210–220. ISBN 0-8444-0866-2. Archived from the original on 2021-07-09. | via Archive.org
- Dudaryonok, Svetlana M.; Vladimirov, Dmitry A. (2012). "«Корейские» религиозные общины и группы Приморья в 1917–1929 годах" ["Korean" Religious Communities and Groups in Maritime Territory, 1917–1929]. Известия Восточного института [Bulletin of the Oriental Institute] (in Russian) (1): 42–55.
- Elliott, Mark R. (2014a) [2004]. "All-Union Council of Evangelical Christians-Baptists". In Hillerbrand, Hans J. (ed.). Encyclopedia of Protestantism. Vol. 1 (Reprint ed.). London; New York: Routledge. pp. 41–44. ISBN 978-0-415-92472-6. Archived from the original on 2020-05-23.
- Elliott, Mark R. (2014b) [2004]. "Russia". In Hillerbrand, Hans J. (ed.). Encyclopedia of Protestantism. Vol. 3 (Reprint ed.). London; New York: Routledge. ISBN 978-0-415-92472-6. Archived from the original on 2020-05-23.
- Fountain, D. G. (1988). Lord Radstock and the Russian Awakening. Southampton, UK: Mayflower Christian Books. ISBN 978-0-907821-04-5.
- Gerd, Stricker (2001). "The Problems of Theological Education: The Experience of Lutheran Institutions in the CIS" (PDF). Religion in Eastern Europe. 21: 1–19. Archived (PDF) from the original on 2012-04-06.
- Gerd, Stricker (2004). "Lutheranism in Russia and the Soviet Union: another response to Filatov and Stepina". Religion, State and Society. 32 (3). Keston Institute: 247–60. doi:10.1080/0963749042000252205.
- Goldfrank, David M. (1998). "Burn, Baby, Burn: Popular Culture and Heresy in Late Medieval Russia". The Journal of Popular Culture. 31 (4): 17–32.
- Grigorenko, Andrei Y. (2004). "История российского адвентизма" [Chap. 4. The History of Russian Adventism]. Эсхатология, милленаризм, адвентизм: история и современность. Философско-религиоведческие очерки [Eschatology, Millenarianism, and Adventism: History and the Present Day. Philosophical and Religious Studies Essays] (in Russian). St. Petersburg: European Dom. ISBN 5-8015-0174-6.
- Heier, E. (1970). Religious Schism in the Russian Aristocracy, 1860–1900: Radstockism and Pashkovism. The Hague: Nijhoff.
- Kahle, Wilhelm (1978). Evangelische Christen in Russland und der Sovjetunion: Ivan Stepanovic Prochanov (1869–1935) und der Weg der Evangeliumchristen und Baptisten (in German). Wuppertal; Kassel: Oncken. ISBN 3789370568.
- Klibanov, Aleksandr I. (1982) [1965]. History of Religious Sectarianism in Russia (1860s–1917). Translated by Ethel Dunn. Oxford; New York: Pergamon Press. ISBN 0-08-026794-7.
- Knox, Zoe (2025). "Keston College and Religious Samizdat: Documenting the Persecution of Christians in the Soviet Union". In deGraffenried, Julie K.; Long, Michael; Dennen, Xenia (eds.). Freedom of Conscience in (Post)Soviet Space: Legacies of Michael Bourdeaux and the Keston Archive. NIU Series in Slavic, East European, and Eurasian Studies. Preface by Rowan Williams. Cornell University Press; Northern Illinois University Press. pp. 13–39. JSTOR 10.7591/jj.24653174.7.
- Kuznetsova, Miriam R. (2009). Early Russian Evangelicals (1874–1929): Historical Background & Hermeneutical Tendencies Based on I.V. Kargel's Written Heritage (PDF) (PhD thesis). Pretoria: University of Pretoria, Faculty of Theology. Archived (PDF) from the original on 2018-04-02.
- Löfstedt, T. (2009). "From Sect to Denomination: The Russian Church of Evangelical Christians". In Westerlund, David (ed.). Global Pentecostalism: Encounters with Other Religious Traditions. Library of Modern Religion Series. London: I. B. Tauris. pp. 157–178.
- Lunkin, Roman; Prokof'yev, A. (2000). "Molokans and Dukhobors: Living Sources of Russian Protestantism". Religion, State & Society. 28 (1). Keston Institute: 85–92.
- Lunkin, Roman N. (Summer 2004). "Traditional Pentecostals in Russia". East-West Church & Ministry Report. 12 (3). Global Center, Samford University: 4–7.
- Lunkin, Roman N. (Winter 2005). "The Charismatic movement in Russia". East-West Church & Ministry Report. 13 (1). Global Center, Samford University: 1–5.
- Lunkin, Roman N. (2014). "Российский протестантизм: евангельские христиане как новый социальный феномен" [Russian Protestantism: Evangelical Christians as a New Social Phenomenon] (PDF). Современная Европа [Contemporary Europe] (in Russian) (3). Institute of Europe, Russian Academy of Science: 133–143. doi:10.15211/soveurope32014133143. ISSN 0201-7083. Archived from the original (PDF) on 2014-10-15.
- Mai, Brent (1 January 2009). "A Brief History of the Volga Germans". The Bulletin of the Genealogical Forum of Oregon. 59 (1).
- Mandryk, Jason (2010). "Russia". Operation World: The Definitive Prayer Guide to Every Nation (7th rev. ed.). Downers Grove, Il: InterVarsity Press. ISBN 978-0-8308-5724-1.
- Melton, J. Gordon, ed. (2005). "Russia". Encyclopedia of Protestantism. Encyclopedia of World Religions. New York: Facts On File. pp. 474–. ISBN 0-8160-5456-8.
- Miazin, Nikolai A. (2025). "Изменение численности протестантского сообщества России, Украины и Белоруссии в постсоветский период" [Changes in the size of the Protestant community in Russia, Ukraine, and Belarus during the post-Soviet period]. Religiovedeniie [Religious Studies] (in Russian) (4). Amur State University: 128–137. doi:10.22250/20728662-2025-4-128-137.
- Michalski, Sergiusz (2013). Reformation and the Visual Arts: The Protestant Image Question in Western and Eastern Europe. London; New York: Routledge. ISBN 978-1-134-92102-7.
- Mitrokhin, Leo N.; et al., eds. (1994a). "Церковь Бога" [Church of God]. Христианство: Словарь [Christianity: Dictionary] (in Russian). Moscow: Respublica. p. 521. ISBN 5-250-02302-9.
- Mitrokhin, Leo N.; et al., eds. (1994b). "Субботствующие пятидесятники" [Sabbatarian Pentecostals]. Христианство: Словарь [Christianity: Dictionary] (in Russian). Moscow: Respublica. p. 455. ISBN 5-250-02302-9.
- Nikitin, Sergei A. (2020). Как квакеры спасали Россию [How Quakers Saved Russia] (in Russian). Moscow: New Literary Review. ISBN 978-5-4448-1242-6.
- Nolte, Hans-Heinrich (1969). Religiöse Toleranz in Rußland 1600–1725. Göttinger Bausteine zur Geschichtswissenschaft, 41 (in German). Göttingen; Zürich; Frankfurt am Main: Musterschmidt. ISBN 3788110414.
- Puzynin, Andrei P. (2013). "Lord Radstock and the St. Petersburg Revival". Evangelical Review of Theology. 37 (2): 100–17.
- Rowe, Michael (1994). Russian Resurrection: Strength in Suffering—A History of Russia's Evangelical Church. London: Marshall Pickering. ISBN 0-551-02702-9.
- Sapiets, Marite (1980). "V. A. Shelkov and the True and Free Adventists of the USSR" (PDF). Religion, State and Society. 8 (3). Keston Institute: 201–217.
- Sawatsky, Walter (1981). Soviet Evangelicals Since World War II. Scottdale, Pa: Herald Press.
- Scott, Richenda C. (1964). Quakers in Russia. London: M. Joseph.
- Shterin, Marat S. (2010). "Russia. Protestantism in Russia". In Melton, J. Gordon; Baumann, Martin (eds.). Religions of the world: a comprehensive encyclopedia of beliefs and practices. Vol. 6 (2nd ed.). Santa Barbara, Ca; Denver, Co; Oxford: ABC-Clio. ISBN 978-1-59884-203-6.
- Shubin, Daniel H. (2005). A History of Russian Christianity. Vol. III: The Synodal Era and the Sectarians—1725 to 1894. New York: Algora Pub. ISBN 978-0-87586-426-6.
- Sorokina, Valeria (2003). "Lutherans in Russia". East-West Church & Ministry Report. 11 (2). Archived from the original on 2020-02-22.
- Teriukova, E. A. (2004). "Из истории протестантизма в России: социальная деятельность Петербургской общины епископальных методистов в начале XX в." [On the history of Protestantism in Russia: The social activity of St. Petersburg Episcopal Methodist community in the early 20th century]. Вестник Санкт-Петербургского университета. Международные отношения [Bulletin of St. Petersburg University]. International Relations Series (in Russian) (4): 53–60.
- Ubeivolc, Vladimir (2016). Rethinking Missio Dei among Evangelical Churches in an Eastern European Orthodox Context. Langham Pub. ISBN 978-1-78368-126-6.
- Wardin, Albert W. (2013). On the Edge: Baptists and Other Free Church Evangelicals in Tsarist Russia, 1855–1917. Eugene, Or: Wipf and Stock Pub. ISBN 978-1-62032-962-7.
- White, James M. (2021). "Colonel V. A. Pashkov: Leader of Russia's Lost Reformation". Quaestio Rossica. 9 (3): 1128–35. doi:10.15826/qr.2021.3.631.
- Zhuk, Sergei I. (2004). Russia's Lost Reformation: Peasants, Millennialism, and Radical Sects in Southern Russia and Ukraine, 1830–1917. Baltimore, Md: Johns Hopkins University Press. ISBN 978-0-8018-7915-9.
