= American Hungarian Reformed Church (Allen Park, Michigan) =

Christian congregation

Coordinates: 42.23549°N 83.22541°W

The Hungarian Reformed Church in Allen Park, Michigan, is the only remaining Hungarian Reformed congregation near Detroit, Michigan out of the former four.

== History ==
Detroit had at least seven churches to serve the new Hungarian immigrants in the 1890s when they flowed into this metropolis. Now, there is one lone church in the vanished Hungarian section of Detroit called Del Ray on South Street.

== Doctrine ==
- Heidelberg Catechism
- Second Helvetic Confession

== Affiliations ==
The congregation is a member of the Reformed Church in Hungary, the Calvin Synod (United Church of Christ), and the Hungarian Reformed Church in America.
