= Hungarian Reformed Communion =

Protestant church community

Hungarian Reformed Church
- Magyar Református Egyház
- Type: Western Christianity
- Classification: Protestant
- Orientation: Continental Reformed
- Scripture: Bible
- Theology: Reformed theology
- Polity: Episcopal
- Structure: Communion
- Dioceses: 10
- Region: Carpathian Basin
- Language: Hungarian
- Liturgy: Reformed
- Origin: 2009
- Congregations: 3,125
- Members: 1,623,991

The Hungarian Reformed Church (HRC) or Hungarian Reformed Communion (Hungarian: Magyar Református Egyház) is a global fellowship of continental Reformed denominations historically related to the Reformed Church of Hungary.

The purpose of the organization is to maintain unity among Hungarian Reformed churches in different countries and to give joint representation of denominations in international organizations of Reformed denominations.

== History ==
From the Dissolution of Austria-Hungary, after the First World War, the members of the Reformed Church of Hungary were spread over several countries. In each of these, Hungarian reformeds organized themselves as a new national denomination.

On May 22, 2009, 6 of the Hungarian Reformed denominations (Reformed Church in Hungary, Reformed Church in Romania, Reformed Church in Transcarpathia, Reformed Christian Church in Serbia, Reformed Christian Church in Slovakia and Reformed Church in Slovenia) decided to form a Hungarian Reformed Communion, also called the Hungarian Reformed Church.

In the same year, the Hungarian Reformed Church in America joined the organization.

In 2013, the Reformed Christian Calvinist Church in Croatia was accepted as a member.

In 2019, the Calvin Synod (United Church of Christ) was accepted as a member and in 2024, the Hungarian Reformed Church in Australia also joined.

== Doctrine ==
All denominations part of the communion subscribe to the Second Helvetic Confession and Heidelberg Catechism as a faithful expression of biblical doctrines, such as the Reformed Church of Hungary.

Likewise, they differ from the other reformed denominations in that they call those responsible for a church jurisdiction "bishop".

== Members ==
Communion members are:

Country	Denomination	Number of congregations	Number of members	Year
Hungary	Reformed Church in Hungary	1,230	943,982	2022
Romania	Reformed Church in Romania	1,352	495,380	2021
Slovakia	Reformed Christian Church in Slovakia	304	85,271	2021
Ukraine	Reformed Church in Sub-Carpathia/ Reformed Church in Transcarpathia	108	70,000	2015
Western Europe	Federation of Hungarian-Speaking Protestant Congregations in Western Europe	51	-	2024
Serbia	Reformed Christian Church in Serbia	50	17,000	2004
United States	Hungarian Reformed Church in America	27	6,080	2006
Croatia	Reformed Christian Calvinist Church in Croatia	21	3,378	2006
United States	Calvin Synod (United Church of Christ)	29	2,500	2016
Slovenia	Reformed Church in Slovenia	4	400	2004
Luxembourg	Hungarian Protestant Parish in Luxemburg	1	-	-
Australia	Hungarian Reformed Church in Australia	-	-	-
Canada	Association of the Hungarian Reformed Churches in Canada	-	-	-
Western Europe	Hungarian Reformed Pastoral Service in Western Europe	-	-	-
Carpathian Basin	Hungarian Reformed Communion	3,176	1,623,991	2004-2024
