= HRCA =

HRCA may refer to:

- Conservation Halton, also known as the Halton Region Conservation Authority
- Hungarian Reformed Church in America
