= AMRE =

AMRE may refer to:

- Amerikai Magyar Református Egyház, the Hungarian Reformed Church in America
- SPARK Museum of Electrical Invention, formerly the American Museum of Radio and Electricity
