= Sukhie Baptisty =

19th-century Spiritual Christian movement

Sukhie Baptisty (Russian: Сухие Баптисты "dry Baptists") was a 19th-century Spiritual Christian movement, which was born from Molokans who merged with the Russian Union of Evangelical Christians. They were called "dry Baptists", because they refused to baptize believers in physical water, but instead believing in a "baptism of the spirit", insisting that baptism was a purely spiritual experience instead of a physical one, they also denied baptismal regeneration. The dry Baptists often debated the Orthodox on the baptism of infants and on the efficacy of baptism. One dry Baptist congregation was still registered in Georgia, though more likely exist.

== See also ==
- Protestantism in Russia
- Shtundists
- Spiritual Christianity
