= Reformed Christian Church in Slovenia =

The Reformed Christian Church in Slovenia (Slovene: Reforma krščanske cerkve v Sloveniji) is a Christian denomination in Slovenia. Before World War I, it was part of the Reformed Church in Hungary, and from 1921 it was part of the Reformed Church in Yugoslavia. In early 1990s, Slovenia become an independent state and a separate church was established in 1993.

The denomination has 4 congregations and 400 members in the early 2000s. These churches are in Szentlászló, Szerdahely, Csekefa and Domaföld. The current bishop is The church hopes to extends its work to the cities where Calvinist Hungarians migrated. The Reformed Christian Church in Slovenia subscribes to the Apostles Creed, Nicene Creed, Athanasian Creed, Heidelberg Catechism and the Second Helvetic Confession, and is a member of the World Communion of Reformed Churches and the Hungarian Reformed Communion.
