= Russian Evangelical Alliance =

Russian evangelical Christian organisation

- Founded: 2003
- Type: Evangelical organization
- Purpose: Evangelical Christianity
- Location: Russia

The Russian Evangelical Alliance (Russian: Российский Евангельский Альянс, REA) is a national evangelical alliance in Russia and member of the World Evangelical Alliance.

== History ==
The Russian Evangelical Alliance was re-established in 2003 by the heads of 19 Russian evangelical organisations representing all Protestant denominations in the Russian Federation.
