= Hungarian Reformed Church in Australia =

Hungarian Protestant church in Australia

The Hungarian Reformed Church in Melbourne is located in Fitzroy North, VIC

The Hungarian Reformed Church in Australia is a Hungarian Protestant church in Australia. Its headquarters is in Melbourne; its head is Rev. Csaba Dézsi, the pastor of the North Fitzroy Reformed Hungarian congregation. The Australian Reformed Hungarian Church is a member of the Hungarian Diaspora Council.

The first Hungarian immigrants came to Australia after World War II. In the 1970s and 1980s, Hungarians from Serbia came to Australia. In the big Australian cities, congregations were established, but not in smaller villages outside the cities, they were isolated from the denomination. The Hungarian-Australian first pastor was Rev. Ferenc Antal. In Australia, four districts were formed. These districts are very small. Hundreds of kilometres separates these congregations, and church members. The Victoria District has the greatest history. Its seat is in Melbourne, where the Hungarian Reformed Church has its own building and manse, everywhere else buildings are rented. The New South Wales District's seat is in Sydney. It has one congregation in Strathfield, and six house fellowships. The Queensland District has two congregations. The seat is in Brisbane. The South Australian District has one congregation in Adelaide. There is a Hungarian Reformed Congregation in Perth, but it doesn't belong to the Hungarian Reformed Church in Australia.

As of 2015, Calvinist Hungarians make up about 7% of the Hungarian population in Australia.

== Theology ==
The church traces back its history to John Calvin, Ulrich Zwingli and Martin Bucer. It adheres to the Five Points of Calvinism.

- Apostles Creed
- Second Helvetic Confession
- Heidelberg Catechism are the official confessions in the Reformed church.

== See also ==
- List of Presbyterian and Reformed denominations in Australia
