= Calvin Synod (United Church of Christ) =

The Calvin Synod is an acting conference of the United Church of Christ, composed entirely of Reformed, or Calvinist congregations of Hungarian descent. Unlike much of the UCC, the Synod is strongly conservative on doctrinal and social matters, and many members of the "Faithful and Welcoming Movement," a renewal group acting to move the UCC in a more conservative direction, belong to this body.

== Origin ==
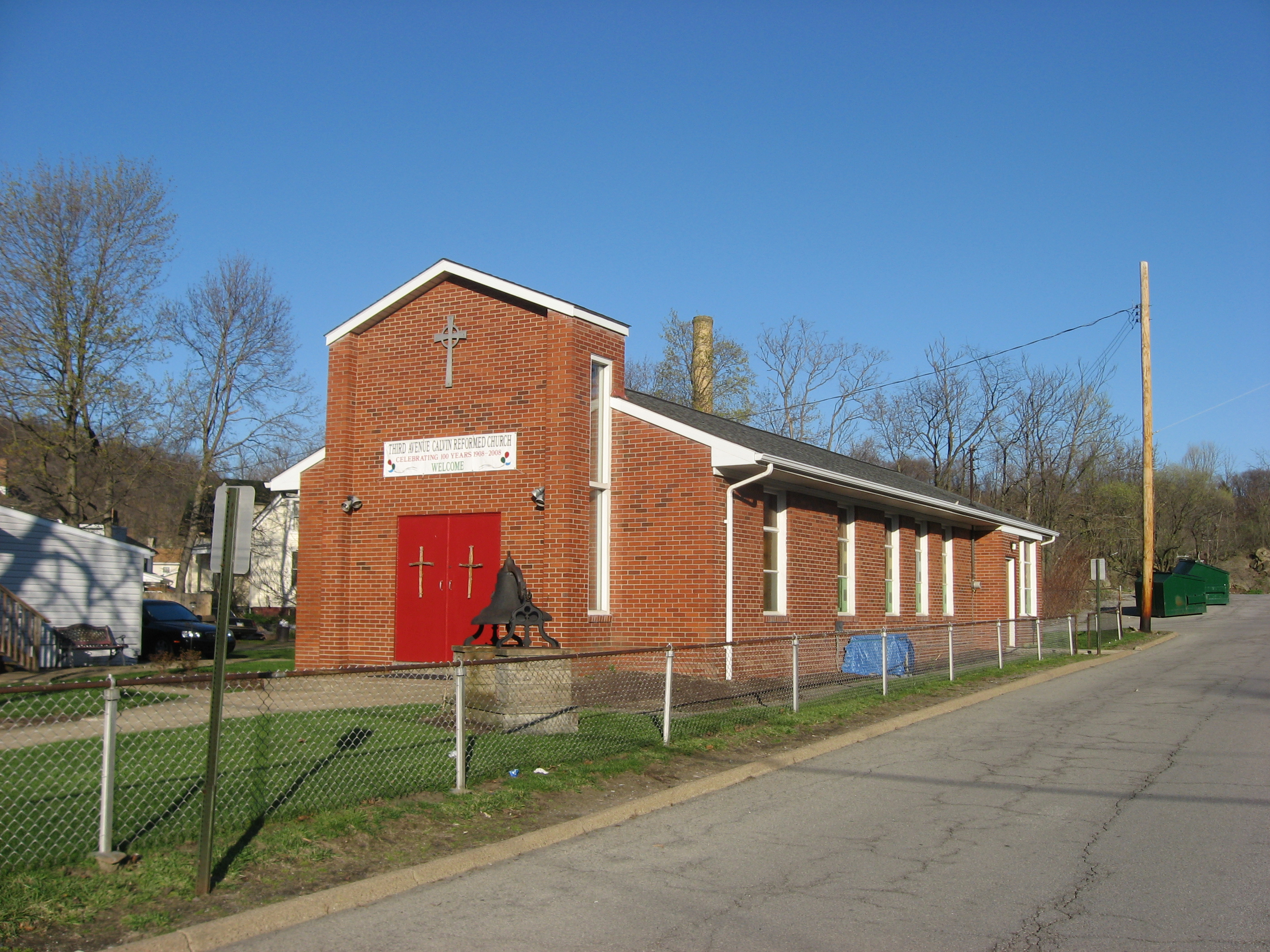
Third Avenue Calvin Reformed Church, Beaver Falls, Pennsylvania

Hungarians began to emigrate to the United States toward the end of the 19th century. Like other immigrants of Protestant faith, they brought their Bibles, catechisms and hymnals with them, in order to pray and worship in their native language. Some congregations were independent, and some became affiliated with the German Reformed Church, the Dutch Reformed Church and the Presbyterian Church. The attempts to create an independent denomination failed at first.

However, the independent churches formed a Classis (the equivalent of a presbytery in Anglo-Saxon Presbyterian churches) in 1896, relating to the Reformed Church in Hungary. After the First World War, the Hungarian Reformed Church was no longer able to provide money to the American immigrant congregations. The Reformed Church in Hungary assigned its Classis churches to the German Reformed Church in the U.S., then known as the Reformed Church in the United States. The RCH and the Classis signed the Tiffin Agreement in 1921. Under the terms of the agreement, despite the formally presbyterian structure of the RCUS, the Classis congregations were given relative autonomy to practice their own traditions without outside interference. Several congregations, though, rejected this effort and created the free-standing Hungarian Reformed Church in America.

The Classis churches were organized into a non-geographical separate RCUS synod, the Magyar, similar to those previously provided for German-speaking congregations in the Midwestern U.S. and urban areas in the Northeast. In 1934 the Evangelical Synod of North America and the RCUS united. The new group was known as the Evangelical and Reformed Church and incorporated Lutheran doctrine, as well as Reformed.

Although the Magyar Synod rejected the Lutheran doctrines brought from the ESNA and maintained its commitment to stricter, more dogmatically Calvinistic theology, the E&R Church continued to honor the Tiffin Agreement and opted to allow the Synod to keep its distinctive teachings within the general framework of the new denomination.

Even though the Synod was the sole E&R synod to disapprove of the merger of the Congregational Christian Churches with the E&R Church to become the UCC, officials of the new denomination chose to continue the RCUS and E&R arrangement and exempt the Synod from the mandated geographical realignments of CC conferences and E&R synods into UCC entities, in the early 1960s. The only change that occurred was the renaming of the Magyar Synod to the Calvin Synod.

The Synod has consistently rejected the UCC's predominantly liberal theological and political stances, especially its recent acceptance of homosexuality as an acceptable Christian lifestyle. When the 2005 General Synod passed a resolution calling for the equality of same-sex couples with those of traditional male-female marriages, the few Synod congregations that were actively participating in UCC functions outside the Synod discontinued doing so and re-directed their loyalties, along with their sister churches, toward the North Carolina–based F&W organization.

In 2019, the Calvin Synod also became affiliated with the Hungarian Reformed Church.

== Statistics ==
The Synod has four classes, Classis East, Classis West, Classis Lakeside and Classis Central. The Synod reported 33 churches and some 4,000 members in 2006. According to the synod website there are 25 congregations in four classes. The bishop is the Rev. Csaba Krasznai.

In 2012, at the Calvin Synod's Conference Council, the members of the Council established the Vision and Church Growth Committee, which was requested and approved by the Calvin Synod Conference.

== Doctrine ==
- Heidelberg Catechism
- Second Helvetic Confession

== See also ==
- Hungarian Reformed Church in America
- Reformed Church in Hungary
