= Hungarian Reformed Church in America =

Reformed Protestant church in the U.S.

The Hungarian Reformed Church in America (HRCA; Hungarian: Amerikai Magyar Református Egyház, abbreviated AMRE) is a Reformed Protestant church in the United States that serves people of Hungarian ancestry. The church has approximately 6,080 members.

== History ==
After World War I, Hungarian people began to come to the United States. They established churches which were under the control of the Reformed Church in their home country. In 1921, an agreement was made to be part of the American Reformed churches. This was the Tiffini Agreement. One part of these churches accepted this - today this is the Calvin Synod of the United Church of Christ - but not all accepted the Tiffini Agreement. Dr Zoltan Kuthy, a dean in New York, and Rev. Endre Sebestyén dreamed of a separate Hungarian Reformed Church. This effort was widely supported. Independent Hungarian churches separated from these churches. The first was the Independent Hungarian Reformed Church in Dubuque, Pennsylvania in 1924. The Independent Hungarian Reformed Church in America was formed. Five pastors signed the creation of this new denomination, Rev. Lajos Nánássy, Perth Amboy, NJ, Mihály Kovács, Detroit, MI, Endre Sebestyén, Duquesne, PA, Károly Vincze, Carteret, NJ, György Borsy-Kerekes, McKeesport, PA. In Dubuque they established a Presbytery. The dean was Endre Sebestyén, the janitor was István Bodnár. Sister church relations was established with the Hungarian Reformed Church.

In 1928 a General Assembly was held in Trenton, NJ and a second presbytery was created, this time the denomination consisted of 17 congregations and 12 pastors. The church had a newspaper, founded in 1921, this was the Hungarian Church (Magyar Egyház - in Hungarian) The present name was adopted in 1958. The church follows the Hungarian model and elects a Bishop, and Deans for its three classes. They hold Synod meetings in every four years.

== Statistics ==
Today there are 23 congregations, 11 mission churches, and 24 pastors.

== Recent issues ==
The Hungarian Reformed community in America was refreshed by the refugees fleeing the Soviet crushing of the abortive revolution of 1956. Although the Hungarian Reformed Church in America has faced ageing and declining memberships, the church has more recently opened several new mission churches.

The Hungarian Reformed Church in America applied for membership in the Hungarian Reformed Communion in May 2009. Later the Hungarian Reformed Church in America voted to join the Reformed Church in Hungary. In the same year the church celebrated its 85th anniversary.

== Theology ==
- Apostles Creed
- Nicene Creed
- Heidelberg Catechism
- Second Helvetic Confession

== Congregations ==
- See Hungarian congregations across the US www.hungariancatholicmission.com/faith/otherhungariandenominations-us.htm
- American Hungarian Reformed Church (Allen Park, Michigan)
- Free Magyar Reformed Church of San Francisco & Vicinity (Redwood City, California)
