= Roman Nikolaevich Lunkin =

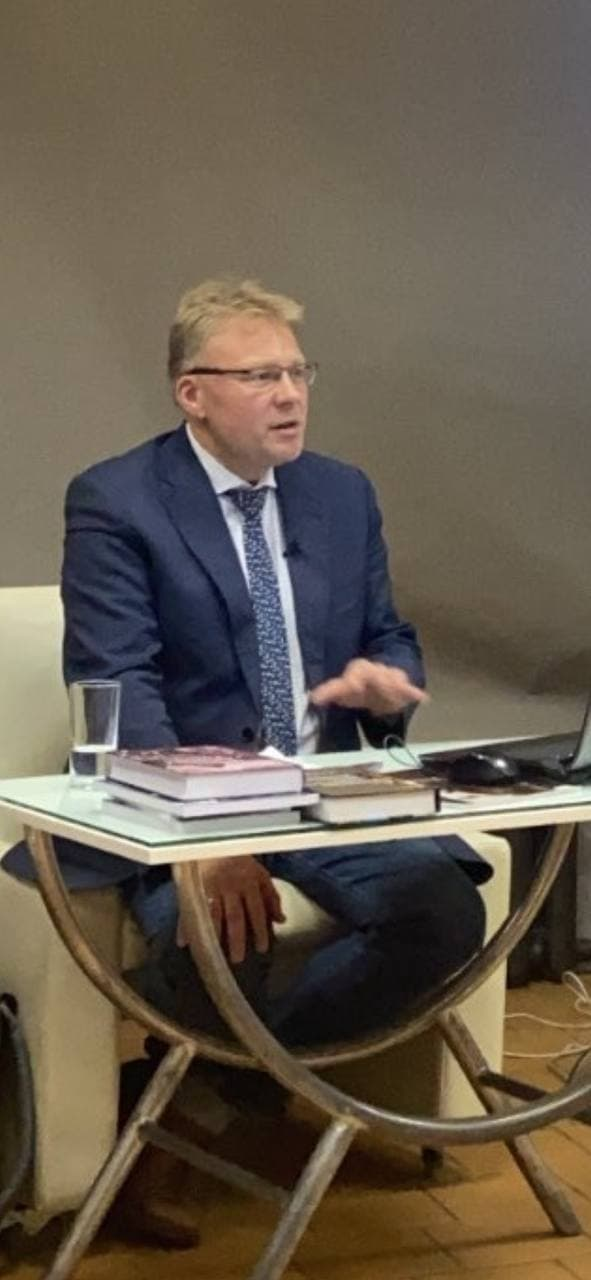
- Lecture on September 25, 2021, at the N. Nekrasov Central Universal Scientific Library
- Born: 13 June 1976; Moscow
- Occupation: Religious studies scholar, sociologist, political scientist
- Employer: Institute of Europe, Russian Academy of Sciences

Roman Nikolaevich Lunkin (born June 13, 1976, Moscow, USSR) is a Russian religious studies scholar, sociologist of religion, publicist, and journalist.

== Life ==
From 1995 to 1998, he was a freelance contributor to the weekly newspaper Russkaya Mysl.

In 1998, he hosted the program “Historical Calendar” on the Christian Church and Community Channel of Radio Sofia.

In 1998, he graduated with honors from the MSU Faculty of History of Lomonosov Moscow State University, defending his thesis on the Apostle John the Theologian.

From 1998 to 2000, he was a correspondent for the Keston News Service and the English-language magazine Frontier.

From 1998 to the present, Nikolaevich is a member of the Russian team at the Keston Institute and a staff member of the project Encyclopedia of Contemporary Religious Life in Russia (led by Canon Michael Burdo and Professor S. B. Filatov) for the publication of the Atlas of Contemporary Religious Life in Russia. As part of the project, he participated in field sociological research in more than 70 regions of Russia. Lunkin's work involved traveling throughout Russia's regions and conducting interviews with representatives of various religious organizations. His materials were used to compile articles for the Encyclopedia of Religious Life in Russia. A significant portion of the publications in the second volume of Contemporary Religious Life in Russia, or more than a third of the book's total volume—was authored by Roman Lunkin.

From 2001 to 2002, he served as editor and managing editor of Nasha Obshcheregionalnaya Gazeta, a socio-political weekly for the federal districts, and from 2002 to 2003, he was an editor-correspondent for the news service of the television company Channel Three (OJSC TRVK "Moskovia") and a correspondent for the program "Main Topic".

On February 7, 2003, he began contributing to the online journal Portal-Credo.ru. From 2004 to 2009, he served as a writer, reporter, and later columnist for Portal-Credo.ru.

On April 28, 2005, at the Institute of Philosophy, Russian Academy of Sciences, under the academic supervision of RAS Academician L. N. Mitrokhin, he defended his dissertation for the degree of Candidate of Philosophical Sciences on the topic Вероучение и социальная деятельность пятидесятников в России (The Doctrine and Social Activities of the Pentecostals in Russia). The official evaluators were A. Yu. Grigorenko, head of the Department of Religious Studies at Herzen State Pedagogical University, and A. A. Voronin. The host organization is the "Religion in Modern Society" Center at the Institute for Comprehensive Social Research of the Russian Academy of Sciences, Marx–Engels–Lenin Institute. According to the ProChurch.info portal, positive feedback was received from Professor E. I. Volkova, head of the "Religion and Culture" Center at the Faculty of Foreign Languages of Lomonosov Moscow State University, and Professor A. A. Krasikov, head of the Center for the Study of Religion and Society at the Institute of Europe of the Russian Academy of Sciences.

Since 2005, he has been a senior research fellow, since 2011, a leading research fellow; and since 2016, the director of the Center for the Study of Religion and Society at the Institute of Europe of the Russian Academy of Sciences, as well as deputy editor-in-chief of the journal Современная Европа (Modern Europe).

In 2006, he joined the Slavic Legal Center and became the editor-in-chief of the journal Религия и право (Religion and Law).

Since 2008, Lunkin is director of the Institute of Religion and Law, a private research institution affiliated with the Slavic Legal Center.

Since June 2011, he has served as co-chair of the non-profit partnership "Guild of Experts on Religion and Law" alongside Inna Zagrebina, and later became president of the partnership.

Since September 2011, he has been the editor-in-chief of the online newspaper Религия и право "Religion and Law" of the Slavic Legal Center.

In 2011, he served as a Public Policy Scholar at the Woodrow Wilson International Center for Scholars.

In 2018, at the Institute of Europe of the Russian Academy of Sciences, he defended his dissertation for the degree of Doctor of Political Science on the topic Роль христианских церквей Европы в разрешении социально-политических кризисов (The Role of European Christian Churches in Resolving Socio-Political Crises) (political institutions, processes, and technologies); Scientific advisor: Doctor of Historical Sciences, Professor A. A. Krasikova; Official opponents: Doctor of Sociological Sciences, Professor I. G. Kargina; Doctor of Political Science, Professor A. V. Mitrofanova; and Doctor of Political Science, Professor I. L. Prokhorenko; Lead organization — Federal Research Center for Sociology of the Russian Academy of Sciences.

He become lecturer in the Legal Studies of Religion program at the Moscow Theological Seminary of Evangelical Christians-Baptists.

Participant in seminars at the Carnegie Moscow Center as part of the "Religion, Society, and Security" program.

In April 2022, he received the honorary academic title of Professor of the Russian Academy of Sciences (elected by the Department of Global Problems and International Relations). In the 2022 Russian Academy of Sciences elections, he ran for the position of Corresponding Member of the Russian Academy of Sciences in the Department of Global Problems and International Relations, but was not elected.

== Personal life ==
He considers himself Orthodox; in his youth, he served as an altar boy.

He is friends with P. V. Mickiewicz and Yuri Sipko.

He is married to historian Elena Sitnikova and has a daughter and a son.

By his own admission, he considers politician Alexei Navalny to be the Antichrist.

== Works ==
Thesis

- Лункин, Роман Николаевич (2005). Вероучение и социальная деятельность пятидесятников в России (дис. … канд. филос. наук [Ph.D. thesis]). Moscow: Institute of Philosophy, Russian Academy of Sciences.
- Лункин, Роман Николаевич (2018). Роль христианских церквей Европы в разрешении социально-политических кризисов (Dissertation for the degree of Doctor of Political Science. Defended at: Institute of European Studies, Russian Academy of Sciences). Moscow.
