= Reformed Church in Sub-Carpathia/ Reformed Church in Transcarpathia =

The Reformed Church in Transcarpathia (Ukrainian: Закарпатська реформатська церква; Hungarian: Kárpátaljai Református Egyház or Kre) is a historic Calvinist church in Ukraine. It is the oldest Protestant church in the country, founded in the 16th century, and a significant part of the Hungarian-speaking ethnicity belong to this denomination.

== History ==
The church was founded in 1921 when this region become part of Czechoslovakia. The church members were Hungarian ethnic people; in the time of formation their church counted approximately 65,000 members in 77 congregations. During World War II the Soviet troops deported 40,000 people from Sub-Carpathia. Transcarpathia as Zakarpattia Oblast became part of the Soviet Union. Pastors from different religions were persecuted and sometimes killed. Church schools, church buildings were taken away. It was restricted to evangelize, to worship and to conduct Sunday school. Public church activities were not permitted, except for funerals. The Soviet Union propagated a totally atheist lifestyle. In the 1970s the situation changed a bit. The church was allowed to train pastors. After the collapse of the Soviet Union things changed. From that time, the church sponsors primary and secondary Calvinist schools. Churches were open again.

== Doctrine ==
- Second Helvetic Confession
- Heidelberg Catechism

== Demographics ==
The church has 120,000-140,000 members in almost 100 parishes. A significant part of ethnic Hungarians in Transcarpathia belong to this church. The Reformed Church in Transcarpathia has three presbyteries, namely, the Beregi, the Ugocsai and the Ungi presbyteries.

== Interchurch relations ==
The Transcarpathian Reformed Church is a member of the World Communion of Reformed Churches and the Hungarian Reformed Communion.
