= Reformed Church in Hungary =

Protestant church in Hungary

- Logo
- Classification: Protestant
- Orientation: Continental Reformed
- Theology: Reformed
- Polity: Quasi-Episcopal (modified Presbyterian)
- Associations: Hungarian Reformed Communion; Ecumenical Council of Churches in Hungary; Church of Scotland; World Communion of Reformed Churches; Communion of Protestant Churches in Europe; Conference of European Churches; World Council of Churches
- Region: Hungary, Hungarian diaspora
- Headquarters: Reformed Great Church of Debrecen, Debrecen, Hungary
- Origin: 1567; Kingdom of Hungary
- Separated from: Roman Catholic Church
- Separations: Reformed Presbyterian Church of Central and Eastern Europe (1998)
- Congregations: 1,249
- Members: 943,982 (Hungary); 1,623,991 (total)
- Ministers: 1,550
- Official website: www.reformatus.hu/english

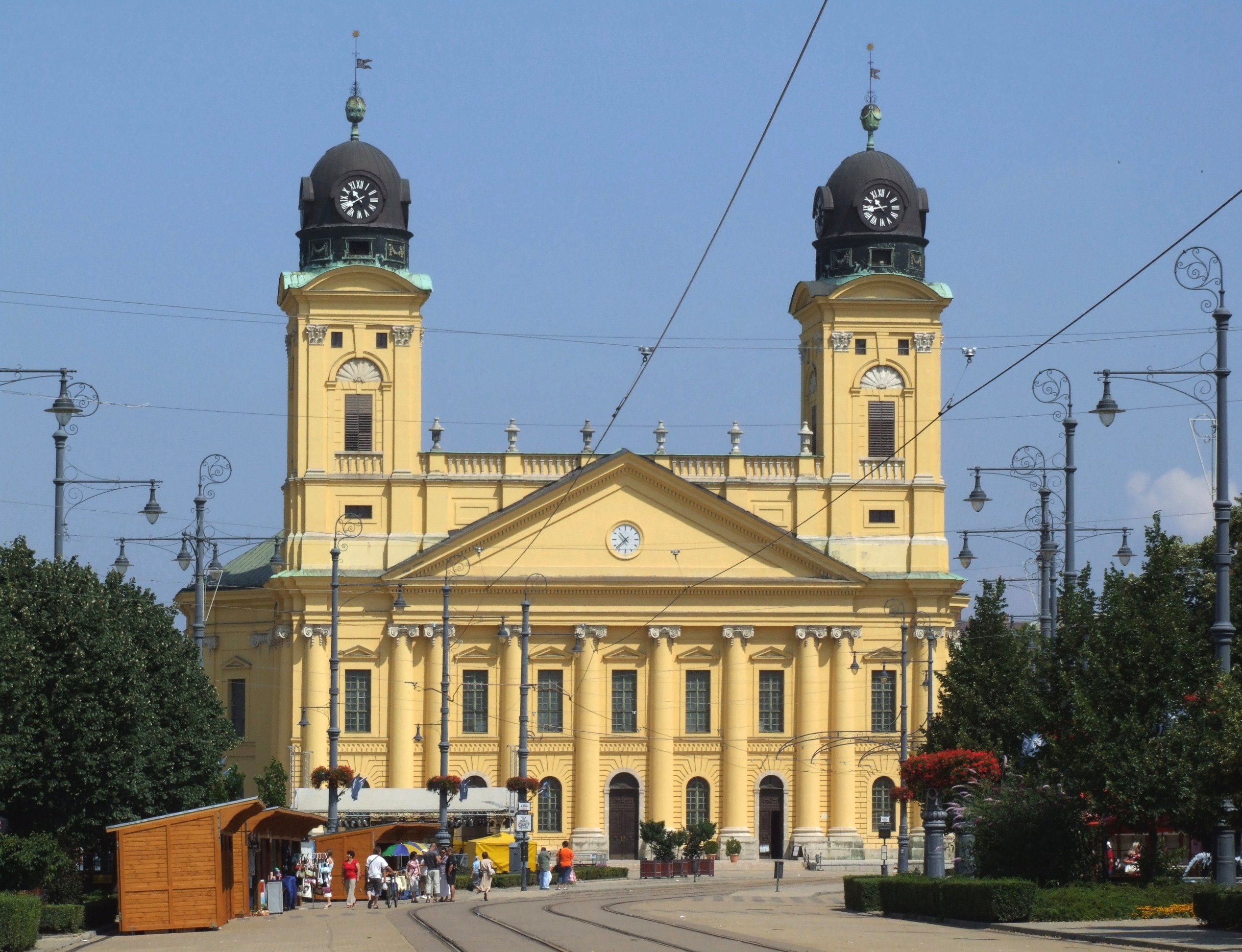
Reformed Great Church of Debrecen in Debrecen, Hungary

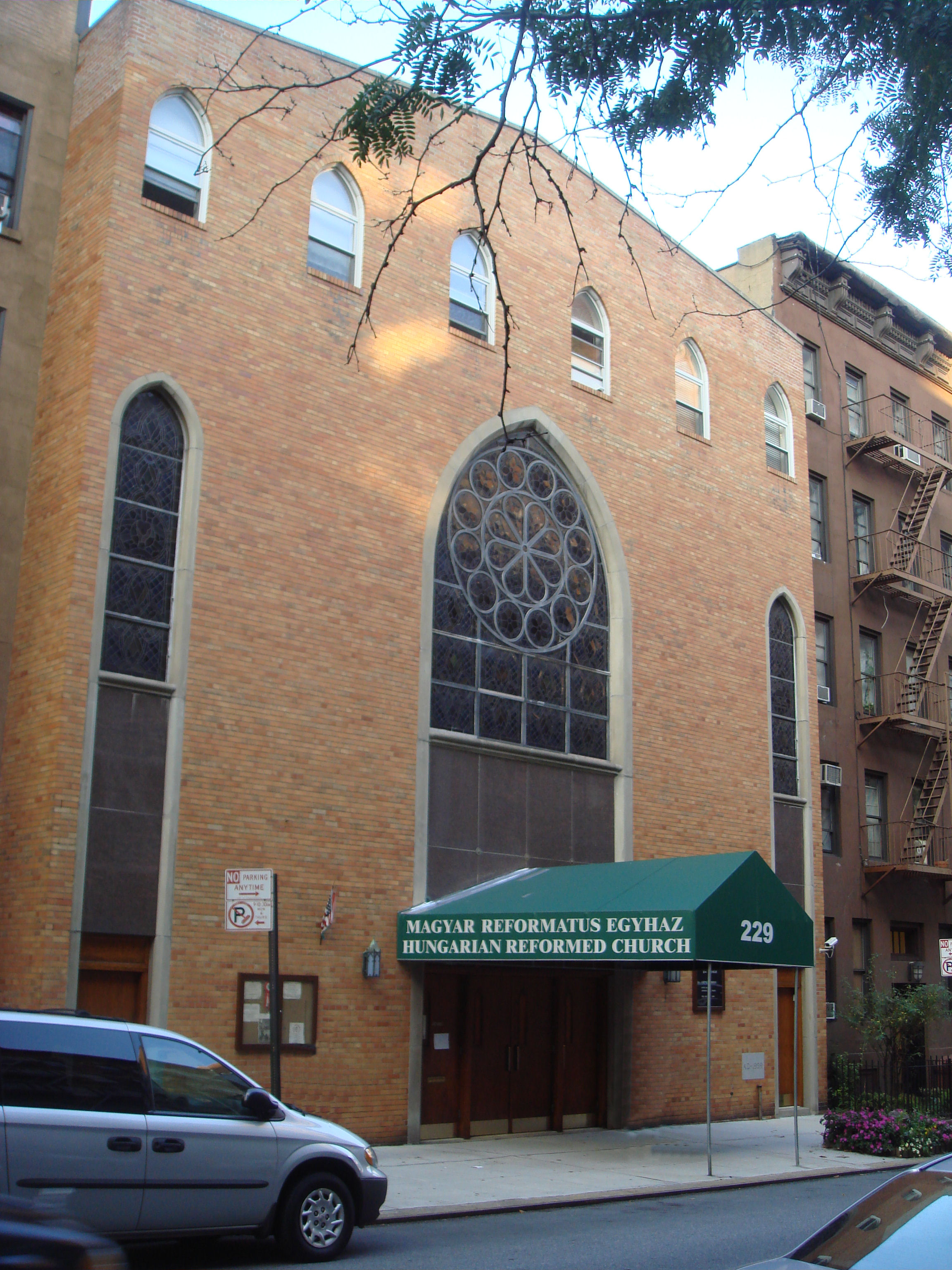
Hungarian Reformed Church building in Manhattan, New York

The Reformed Church in Hungary (Hungarian: Magyarországi Református Egyház, MRE, pronounced [ˈmɒɟɒrorsaːgi ˈrɛformaːtuʃ ˈɛɟhaːz]) is the largest Protestant church in Hungary, with parishes also among the Hungarian diaspora abroad. It is made up of 1,249 congregations in 27 presbyteries and four church districts and has a membership of over 1.6 million, making it the second largest Christian church in Hungary after the Catholic Church. As a Continental Reformed church, its doctrines and practices reflect a Calvinist theology, for which the Hungarian term is református (pronounced [ˈrɛformaːtuʃ]).

The Hungarian Reformed Church became the symbol of national Hungarian culture, since it led to the translation of the Bible into the Hungarian language by Hussite pastors, and contributed to the education of the population through its school system.

== History ==
The Reformation spread to Hungary during the 16th century. In Geneva, Switzerland, the French reformer John Calvin formulated the doctrines of the Reformed Church, and his followers spread the Reformed (Calvinist) gospel across Europe.

As a result of the Ottoman conquest of Hungary, Hungary was divided into three parts. The northwest came under Habsburg rule; the eastern part of the kingdom and Transylvania (vassal state) came under the Ottoman Empire. While the Ottomans urged conversion to Islam, it was the Reformation which instead spread throughout Turkish-occupied Hungarian territories. Only in the Habsburg-ruled western Hungary was this process prevented by the Counter-Reformation policy encouraged by the Monarchy.

A Calvinist Constitutional Synod was held in 1567 in Debrecen, the main hub of Hungarian Calvinism, where the Second Helvetic Confession was adopted as the official confession of Hungarian Calvinists.

In 1683-1699, the Ottomans were defeated by a Christian alliance led by the Habsburgs. After this, the Habsburg Emperors started to strongly introduce the Counter-Reformation into the liberated territories. Consequently, for most of the 18th century, Hungarian Protestants were second-class citizens. Imperial edicts, such as the Resolutio Carolina of 1731, settled the status of Protestant churches.

Only the end of the 18th century brought some relief to the Hungarian Reformed Church. Finally, the 1867 establishment of the Austro-Hungarian Dual Monarchy gave free way for the legal emancipation of Hungarian Protestants. In 1881, for the first time in an almost 400-year-long history, the four Hungarian Reformed Church Districts together with the Transylvanian Reformed Church held a unified Synod in the city of Debrecen. The modern Hungarian Reformed Church was born there at the Debrecen Synod of 1881. The internal hierarchy and the synodal-presbyterian system of the Reformed Church remains nearly unchanged from that time.

After World War I, the Treaty of Trianon in 1920 greatly altered the Hungarian Reformed Church. It made two two-thirds of the Hungarian people and a large number of Reformed Synod's and congregations suddenly within foreign countries. The percentages of Protestantism in Hungary, however, has been stable over the last century (1938-2010), oscillating between 10% and 20% of the population.

Another trial came to the Church with the establishment of the People's Republic of Hungary after World War II. After the confiscation of church lands, schools and institutions, on October 7, 1948, the General Secretary of the Communist Party, Mátyás Rákosi, forced the Reformed Church to sign an agreement that brought all the denomination's work and personnel under the control of the secret police, the ÁVH and the MIA III, and of the ruling Communist Party of Hungary. The forty years of Communist rule brought both state atheism and religious persecution to members of all Christian denominations, and only the end of communism in Hungary brought about relief. Thereafter, a "free church in free state" model has been adopted.

== Theology ==
The Reformed Church in Hungary accepts the Bible as the word of God. Beyond the early creeds (the Athanasian Creed, Apostles' Creed, and Nicene Creed), it accepts the Heidelberg Catechism, and the Second Helvetic Confession.

== Organization ==
In order to organize church life on regional and national levels, the RCH has established higher structural bodies for church legislation and operation: 27 presbyteries, four districts, and the General Synod. Presbyteries usually contain approximately 30-40 congregations and have mainly administrative roles. Each Presbytery belongs in one of the four church districts: Cistibiscan, Transtibiscan, Danubian, or Transdanubian. The ultimate source of church legislation and administration of the Reformed Church in Hungary is the General Synod.

The RCH (as a member of the worldwide Reformed Church family) is constructed in a representative way from below, from the congregational level. Members of governing bodies on all levels of the church are elected by a group of church members, and in all levels above the congregational pastors and lay people are represented equally.

The church levels function independently providing various kinds of service and using their own budget. A common church constitution, together with a set of specific rules and regulations, makes it possible for different units of the church to create their own operational design. However, for certain transactions they depend on higher church bodies. These general rules allow for freedom and flexibility in the congregations' operation, but they also protect the integrity of the church.

== Hungarian Reformed Church ==
The Hungarian Reformed Church (HRC) was established by the Constituting Synod on 22 May 2009 in Debrecen. It is a community of Reformed churches in the Carpathian Basin that incorporates Hungarian Reformed congregations both within and outside the borders of Hungary because of their separation from each other as a consequence of World War I. The constitution of the church declares that the HRC is a community of joined churches with a common synod known as the General Convent, which can pass legislation and make formal statements concerning issues decided upon by the participating churches. However, the joined churches are autonomous and independently form their own organizational systems.

The constitution of the Hungarian Reformed Church was ratified by the following churches, such as:

- Reformed Church in Hungary
- Reformed Church in the Czech Republic
- Reformed Church in Romania
- Reformed Christian Church in Slovakia
- Reformed Church in Transcarpathia
- Reformed Christian Church in Serbia
- Reformed Christian Calvinist Church in Croatia
- Reformed Church in Slovenia

== International ecumenical relations ==
The RCH is a member of several ecumenical organisations and partner organisations, including:

- World Communion of Reformed Churches
- Community of Protestant Churches in Europe
- Conference of European Churches
- Church and Society Commission of CEC
- Eurodiaconia
- Churches' Commission for Migrant in Europe
- World Council of Churches
- Partnerhilfe
- Gustav Adolf Werk
- HEKS (aid organization of the Protestant churches in Switzerland)
