= List of settlements in Croatian Baranja =

This is a list of settlements in Croatian Baranja sorted alphabetically by city and municipality with their respective populations. All of the following towns and municipalities and their settlements are located completely in Baranja. The only exception is the City of Osijek which has 2 of its 11 settlements located completely in Baranja (Podravlje and Tvrđavica) and a small part of one (Osijek).

== Towns and cities ==
=== Town of Beli Manastir ===
- Beli Manastir, population 8,049
- Branjin Vrh, population 993
- Šećerana, population 540
- Šumarina, population 486

total town population: 10,068

=== City of Osijek ===
- Osijek (only a small part of the settlement on the left bank of the Drava river is located in Baranja)
- Podravlje, population 357
- Tvrđavica, population 578

== Municipalities ==
=== Municipality of Bilje ===
- Bilje, population 5,642
- Kopačevo, population 559
- Kozjak, population 60
- Lug, population 764
- Podunavlje, population 1
- Tikveš, population 10
- Vardarac, population 630
- Zlatna Greda, population 5

total municipal population: 5,642

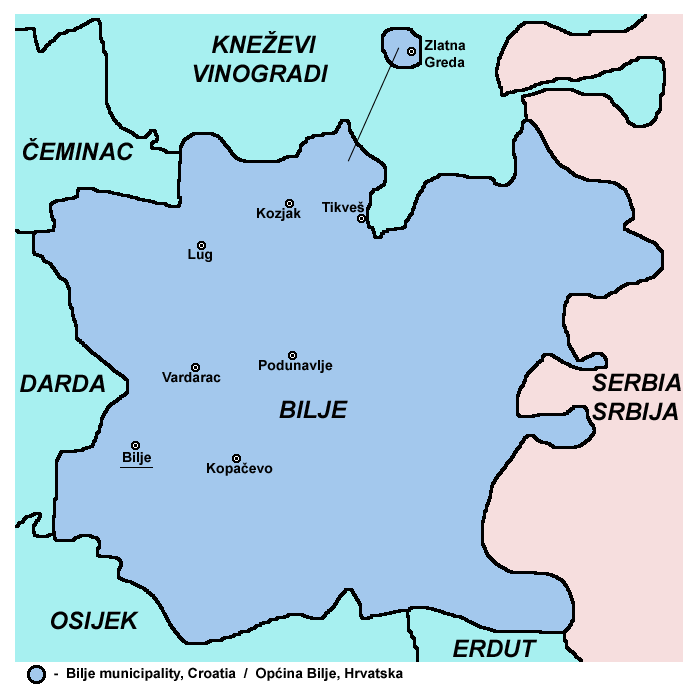
Map of Municipality of Bilje

=== Municipality of Čeminac ===
- Čeminac, population 968
- Grabovac, population 872
- Kozarac, population 730
- Mitrovac, population 20
- Novi Čeminac, population 319

total municipal population: 2,909

=== Municipality of Darda ===
- Darda, population 5,323
- Mece, population 882
- Švajcarnica, population 196
- Uglješ, population 507

total municipal population: 6,908

=== Municipality of Draž ===
- Batina, population 879
- Draž, population 505
- Duboševica, population 554
- Gajić, population 294
- Podolje, population 140
- Topolje, population 395

total municipal population: 2,767

=== Municipality of Jagodnjak ===
- Bolman, population 520
- Jagodnjak, population 1,299
- Majške Međe, population 82
- Novi Bolman, population 122

total municipal population: 2,023

=== Municipality of Kneževi Vinogradi ===
- Jasenovac, population 35
- Kamenac, population 166
- Karanac, population 926
- Kneževi Vinogradi, population 1,657
- Kotlina, population 288
- Mirkovac, population 108
- Sokolovac, population 14
- Suza, population 567
- Zmajevac, population 853

total municipal population: 4,614

=== Municipality of Petlovac ===
- Baranjsko Petrovo Selo, population 525
- Luč, population 435
- Novi Bezdan, population 300
- Novo Nevesinje, population 63
- Petlovac, population 714
- Sudaraž, uninhabited
- Širine, population 58
- Torjanci, population 276
- Zeleno Polje, population 43

total municipal population: 2,405

=== Municipality of Popovac ===
- Branjina, population 322
- Kneževo, population 803
- Popovac, population 959

total municipal population: 2,084
