= Podunavlje (disambiguation) =

Podunavlje may refer to:

- Podunavlje, the name of the Danube river basin parts located in Serbia and Croatia
- Podunavlje District, a district in Serbia
- Podunavlje, a formerly proposed new administrative division of Serbia, roughly corresponding to present-day Southern and Eastern Serbia
- Podunavlje (Novi Sad), one of seven former municipalities of Novi Sad City in Serbia
- Podunavlje, Bilje, a settlement in Croatian Baranja
- Gornje Podunavlje, a protected nature reserve in Serbian part of Bačka
