= Lug, Osijek-Baranja County =

Lug Laskó
- Village (Selo)
- Location of Lug in Croatia Lug (Croatia) Lug (Europe)
- Coordinates: 45.66305556°N 18.77305556°E
- Country: Croatia
- Region: Baranya (Podunavlje)
- County: Osijek-Baranja County
- Municipality: Bilje

Area
  - Total: 50.7 km^{2} (19.6 sq mi)

Population (2021)
  - Total: 602
  - Density: 11.9/km^{2} (30.8/sq mi)
- Time zone: UTC+1 (CET)
  - Summer (DST): UTC+2 (CEST)

Lug (Hungarian: Laskó) is a settlement in the region of Baranja, Croatia. Administratively, it is located in the Bilje municipality within the Osijek-Baranja County. Population is 852 people.

It is known for annual PaprikaFest, festival devoted to sweet and hot peppers in September.

== See also ==
- Osijek-Baranja county
- Baranja
