= Kozjak, Bilje =

Kozjak Keskenyerdő
- Village (Selo)
- Location within Osijek-Baranja County Location within Croatia Location within Europe
- Country: Croatia
- Region: Baranya (Podunavlje)
- County: Osijek-Baranja County
- Municipality: Bilje

Area
  - Total: 0.3 km^{2} (0.12 sq mi)

Population (2021)
  - Total: 22
  - Density: 73/km^{2} (190/sq mi)

Kozjak (Hungarian: Keskenyerdő) is a settlement in the region of Baranja, Croatia. Administratively, it is located in the Bilje municipality within the Osijek-Baranja County. Population is 60 people.
