= Zlatna Greda =

Zlatna Greda Bokroshát
- Village (Selo)
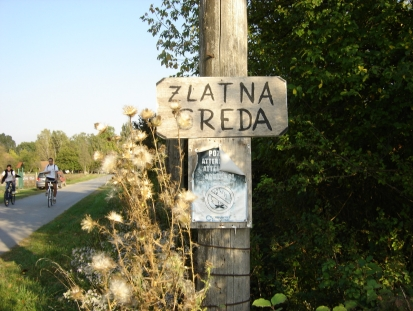

- Location within Osijek-Baranja County Location within Croatia
- Country: Croatia
- Region: Baranya (Podunavlje)
- County: Osijek-Baranja County
- Municipality: Bilje

Area
  - Total: 0.3 km^{2} (0.12 sq mi)

Population (2021)
  - Total: 5
  - Density: 17/km^{2} (43/sq mi)

Zlatna Greda (Hungarian: Bokroshát) is a settlement in the region of Baranja, Croatia. Administratively, it is located in the Bilje municipality within the Osijek-Baranja County. The population is 12.

== See also ==
- Osijek-Baranja county
- Baranja
