= Bilje, Croatia =

Bilje Bellye (Hungarian)
- Municipality
- Bilje Municipality; Općina Bilje
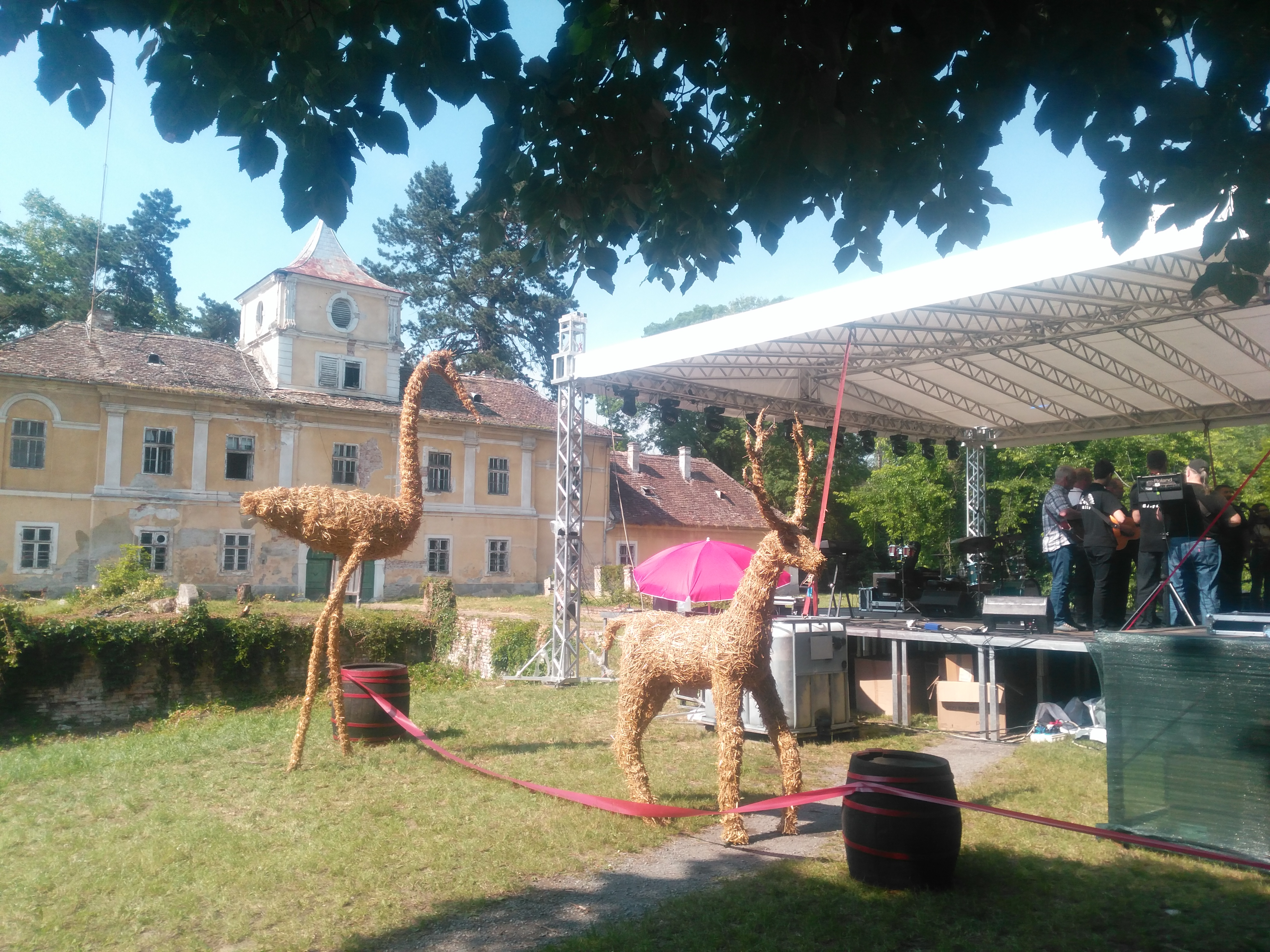

- Flag Coat of arms

- Location within Osijek-Baranja County Location within Croatia Location within Europe
- Coordinates: 45°36′25″N 18°44′38″E
- Country: Croatia
- Region: Baranja (Podunavlje)
- County: Osijek-Baranja County

Government
  - Mayor of Municipality: Željko Cickaj

Area
  - Municipality: 259.5 km^{2} (100.2 sq mi)
  - Urban: 17.3 km^{2} (6.7 sq mi)
- Elevation: 87 m (285 ft)

Population (2021)
  - Municipality: 4,772
  - Density: 18.39/km^{2} (47.63/sq mi)
  - Urban: 3,163
  - Urban density: 183/km^{2} (474/sq mi)
- Time zone: UTC+1 (Central European Time)
- Website: bilje.hr

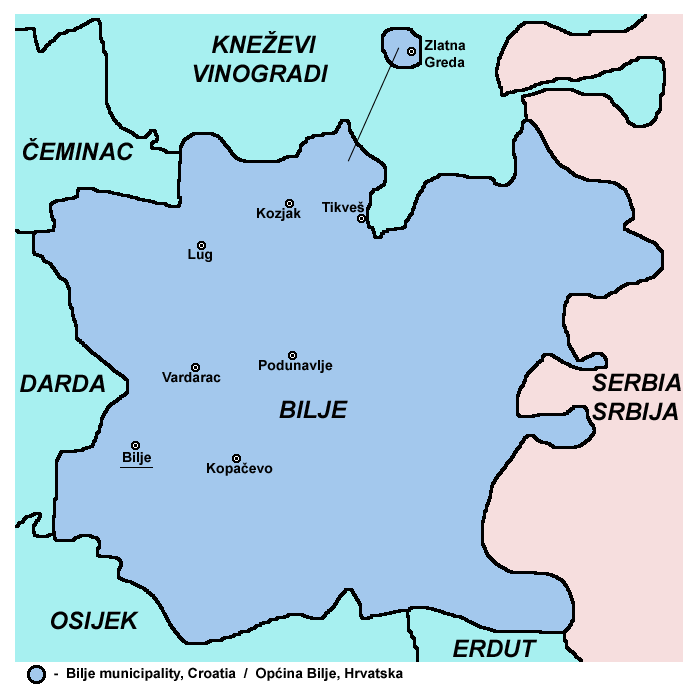
Map of Bilje municipality

Bilje (Hungarian: Bellye) is a municipality in the Baranja region of Osijek-Baranja County, in north-eastern Croatia. It is 5 km northeast of Osijek, on the edge of the Kopački Rit nature park. Prince Eugene of Savoy (1663-1736) constructed a hunting lodge here, Bilje Castle, which later became property of the Teschen branch of the Habsburg family.

== Name ==
Its name derived from the Slavic word "bilje" ("herb" in English). In German the village is known as Belje, in Hungarian as Bellye, and in Serbian Cyrillic as Биље. The area occupied by the municipality of Bilje is 260.15 km².

== Geography ==
The municipality of Bilje include following settlements and population (2011 census):

- Bilje - 3,613
- Kopačevo - 559
- Kozjak - 69
- Lug - 764
- Podunavlje - 1
- Tikveš - 10
- Vardarac - 630
- Zlatna Greda - 5

== Climate ==
Since records began in 1981, the highest temperature recorded at the local weather station was 40.1 °C (104.2 °F), on 24 August 2012.

== Demographics ==
At the 2011 census, there were 5,642 inhabitants in the municipality, including:

- 62.87% Croats
- 29.62% Hungarians
- 3.83% Serbs
- 1.05% Germans
- 0.71% Romani

== Politics ==
=== Minority councils ===
Although the Government of the Republic of Croatia does not guarantee official Croatian-Hungarian bilinguialism here, the statute of Bilje itself does. Preserving traditional Hungarian place names and assigning street names to Hungarian historical figures is legally mandated and carried out.

Directly elected minority councils and representatives are tasked with consulting tasks for the local or regional authorities in which they are advocating for minority rights and interests, integration into public life and participation in the management of local affairs. At the 2023 Croatian national minorities councils and representatives elections Hungarians and Serbs of Croatia each fulfilled legal requirements to elect 10 members municipal minority councils of the Bilje Municipality.

== History ==
In the late 19th and early 20th century, Bilje was part of the Baranya County of the Kingdom of Hungary.

== Literature ==
- Obad Šćitaroci, Mladen; Bojanić Obad Šćitaroci, Bojana; Dundović, Boris (2013). "Manors and Gardens in Northern Croatia in the Age of Historicism" (PDF). Centropa. pp. 175–186. ISSN 1532-5563. Archived from the original (PDF) on 2025-05-05.
