= Tikveš, Croatia =

Tikveš Tökös
- Village (Selo)
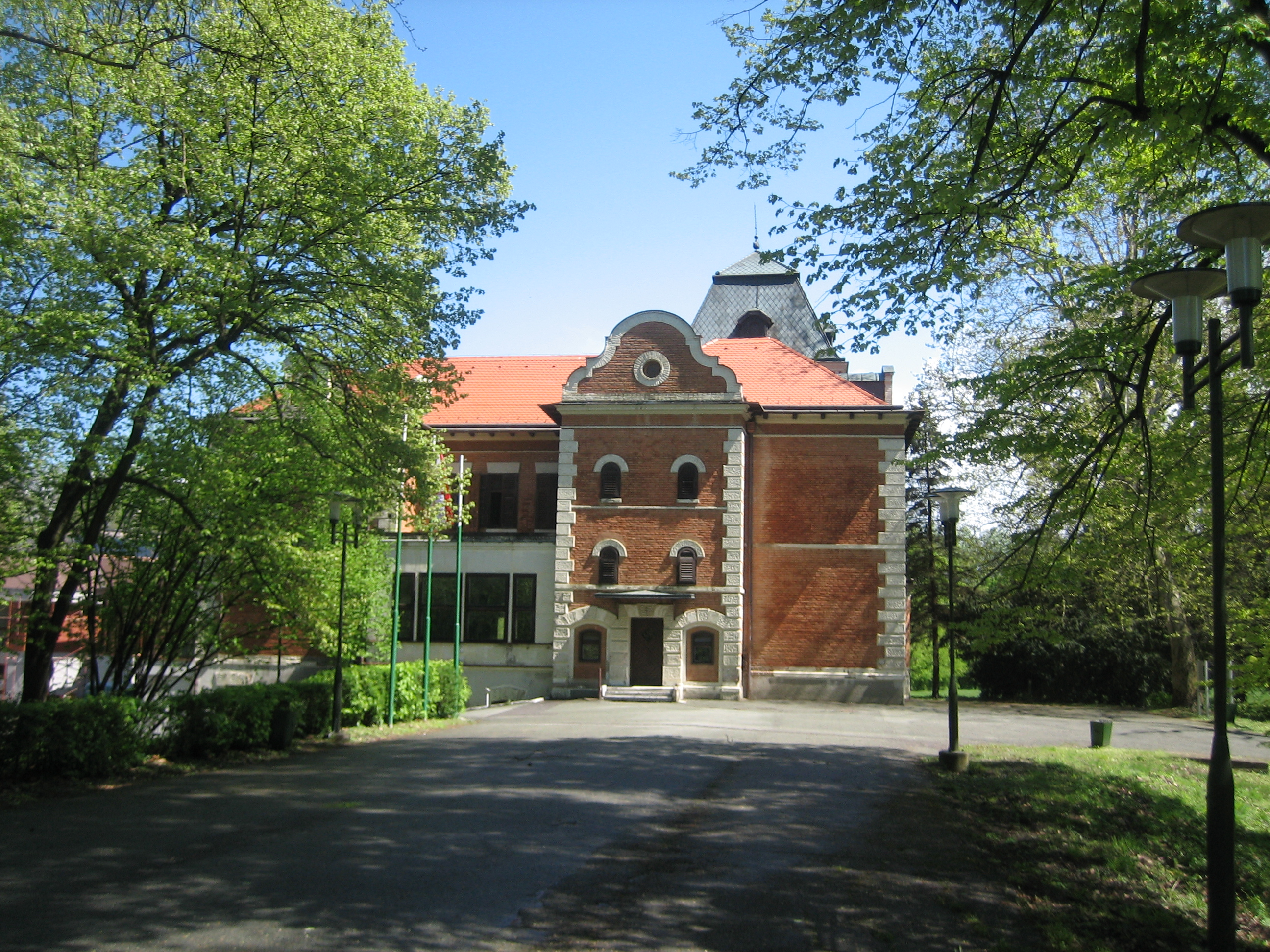
- Tikveš Castle

- Location within Croatia Location within Europe
- Coordinates: 45°40′20″N 18°50′37″E
- Country: Croatia
- Region: Baranya (Podunavlje)
- County: Osijek-Baranja County
- Municipality: Bilje

Area
  - Total: 0.2 km^{2} (0.077 sq mi)

Population (2021)
  - Total: 15
  - Density: 75/km^{2} (190/sq mi)

Tikveš (Hungarian: Tökös) is a settlement in the region of Baranja, Croatia. Administratively, it is located in the Bilje municipality within the Osijek-Baranja County. The population is 29.
