= Podunavlje, Bilje =

Podunavlje Dunai-puszta
- Village (Selo)
- Location within Osijek-Baranja County Location within Croatia Location within Europe
- Coordinates: 45.6302579°N 18.8103133°E
- Country: Croatia
- Region: Baranya (Podunavlje)
- County: Osijek-Baranja County
- Municipality: Bilje

Area
  - Total: 0.1 km^{2} (0.039 sq mi)

Population (2021)
  - Total: 1
  - Density: 10/km^{2} (26/sq mi)

Podunavlje (Hungarian: Dunai-puszta) is a settlement in the region of Baranja, Croatia. Administratively, it is located in the Bilje municipality within the Osijek-Baranja County. Population is 2 people.

== See also ==
- Osijek-Baranja county
- Baranja
