= D517 road =

Road in Croatia

D517 state road

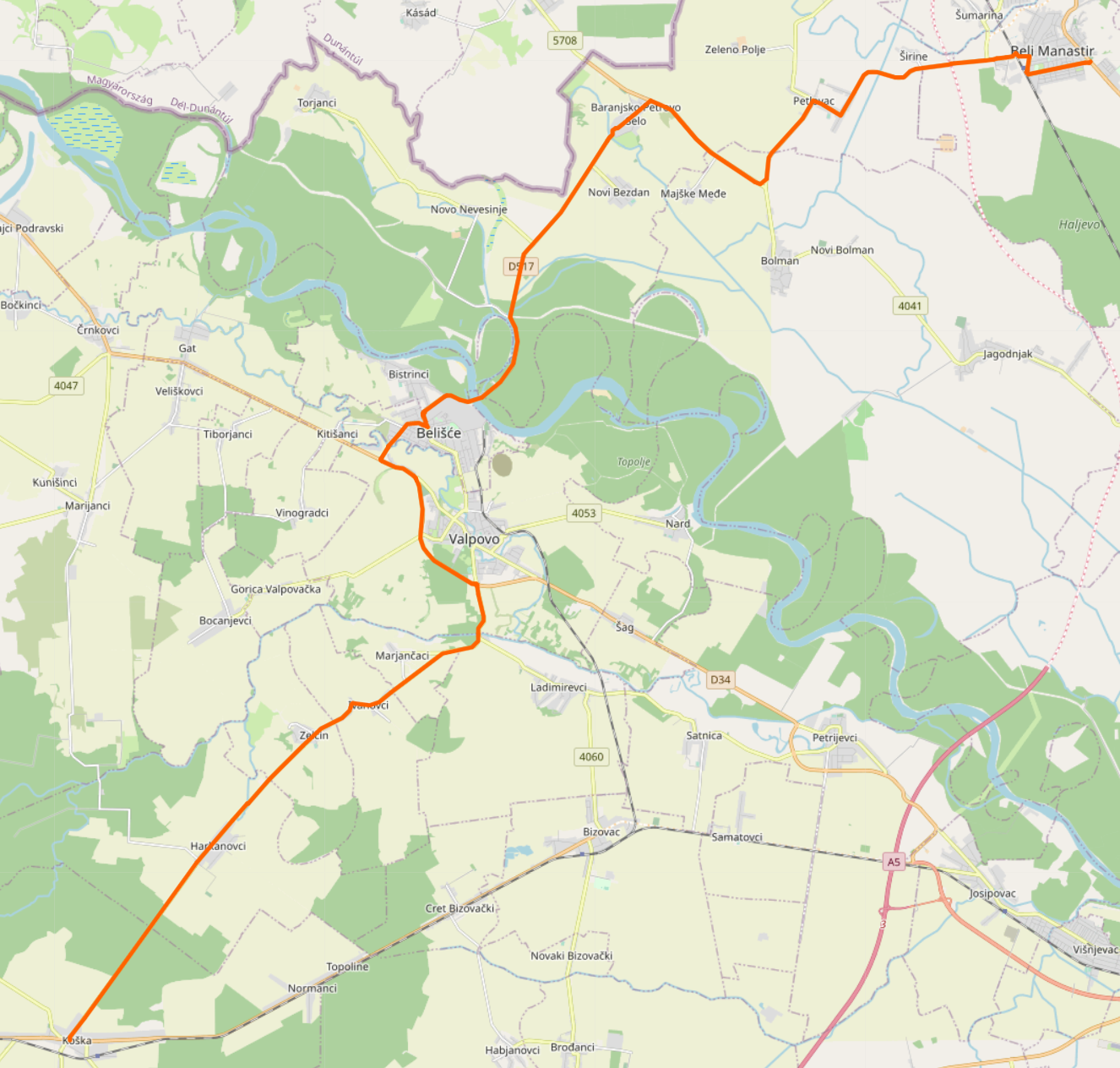

Route information
- Length: 43.76 km (27.19 mi)

Major junctions
- From: D7 in Beli Manastir
- D211 in Baranjsko Petrovo Selo; D34 near Belišće and Valpovo
- To: D2 in Koška

Location
- Country: Croatia
- Counties: Osijek-Baranja
- Major cities: Beli Manastir, Belišće, Valpovo

Highway system
- Highways in Croatia

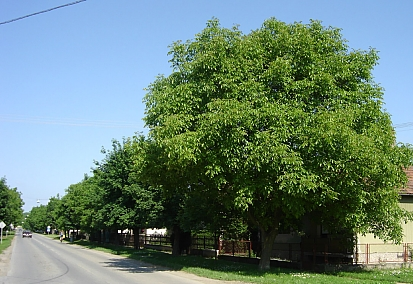
Beli Manastir, at the northern terminus of the D517 road

D517 is a state road in Slavonia and Baranja regions of Croatia connecting D7 state road in Beli Manastir to D2 state road in Koška via Belišće and Valpovo. The road is 43.76 km (27.19 mi) long.

This and all other state roads in Croatia are managed and maintained by Hrvatske ceste, state owned company.

== Traffic volume ==
Traffic is regularly counted and reported by Hrvatske ceste, operator of the road.

D517 traffic volume
Road	Counting site	AADT	ASDT	Notes
D517	2504 Majške Međe	1,551	1,770	Adjacent to the Ž4041 junction.
D517	2403 Belišće - north	1,503	1,855	Adjacent to the Ž4050 junction.

== Road junctions and populated areas ==
D517 junctions/populated areas
Type	Slip roads/Notes
	Beli Manastir; D7 to Duboševica border crossing to Mohács, Hungary (to the north) and to Osijek (D2) (to the south); The northern terminus of the road
	Ž4293 to Šumarina
	L44007 to Širine
	Petlovac; Ž4034 to Luč
	Ž4041 to Bolman and Švajcarnica (D7)
	L44030 to Majške Međe
	Baranjsko Petrovo Selo; D211 to Baranjsko Petrovo Selo border crossing to Beremend, Hungary
	Ž4040 to Novi Bezdan
	Ž4033 to Novo Nevesinje and Torjanci
	L44026 to Novo Nevesinje
	The 107th Brigade of the Croatian Army Bridge
	Belišće; Ž4050 to Valpovo; L44027 to Kitišanci
	D34 to Donji Miholjac (D53) (to the west); The D517 and D34 roads are concurrent to the east of the junction
	Valpovo bypass Ž4051 to Valpovo; Ž4059 to Valpovo (to the east) and Bocanjevci (to the west); Ž4052 to Valpovo; D34 to Osijek (D2) (to the east); The D517 and D34 roads are concurrent to the west of the junction
	Ž4050 to Ladimirevci and Bizovac (D2)
	Ž4103 to Marjačanci
	L44029 to Marjačanci
	Ivanovci; L44052 to Cret Bizovački (D2)
	Zelčin; L44023 to Bocanjevci
	Harkanovci; L44020 to Marijanci
	Koška; D2 to Našice (to the west) and to Osijek (to the east); The southern terminus of the road
