= Croatia–Hungary border =

The border between Croatia and Hungary starts in the North at the tripoint with Slovenia near Muraszemenye and continues southeastward along the Mur river to the confluence with the Drava river. It then continues along the Drava, departing northward from that river thrice, first near the town of Gola, then at the village of Križnica, where the border deviates into the Rinya river until rejoining the Drava, and finally at the village of Torjanci, where the border departs northeastward until it reaches the tripoint with Serbia at the Danube river, although the exact location of the tripoint is subject to the Croatia–Serbia border dispute. The border is roughly 329 km (204 mi) long.

The border was created in its current shape after World War I. Prior to 1919, Međimurje County and the now Croatian part of Baranya (region) north of Osijek were part of was part of Hungary, meaning that the border between the Kingdom of Croatia-Slavonia and the Kingdom of Hungary ran along the Drava river for its entire course, except for the municipalities of Križnica and Gola, which were the part of Croatia-Slavonia even though north of the Drava river.

== Border crossings ==
There are currently 10 border crossings between the two countries, two of which are railway crossings. Following the entry of Croatia into the Schengen Area, regular border checks have been suspended.

The following is a table of the crossing points, listed from North to South:

(Croatia) Croatian checkpoint	County	(Hungary) Hungarian checkpoint	County	Route in Croatia	Route in Hungary
Goričan 1	Međimurje	Letenye 1	Zala		
Goričan 2	Međimurje	Letenye 2	Zala		
Murakeresztúr	Međimurje	Kotoriba	Zala	railway	railway
Botovo	Koprivnica-Križevci	Gyékényes	Somogy	railway	railway
Gola	Koprivnica-Križevci	Berzence	Somogy		681
Terezino Polje	Virovitica-Podravina	Barcs	Somogy		
Donji Miholjac	Osijek-Baranja	Drávaszabolcs	Baranya		
Baranjsko Petrovo Selo	Osijek-Baranja	Beremend	Baranya	local road	211
Branjin Vrh	Osijek-Baranja	Ivándárda	Baranya		
Duboševica	Osijek-Baranja	Udvar	Baranya		

== See also ==
- Hungarian border barrier
