= D211 road =

Road in Croatia

D211 state road

Route information
- Length: 2.0 km (1.2 mi)

Major junctions
- From: Baranjsko Petrovo Selo border crossing to Hungary
- To: D517 in Baranjsko Petrovo Selo

Location
- Country: Croatia
- Counties: Osijek-Baranja

Highway system
- Highways in Croatia

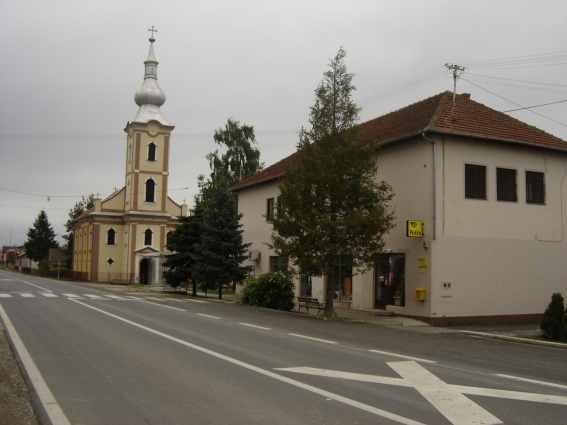
Baranjsko Petrovo Selo, at the southern terminus of the D211 road

D211 is a state road in Baranja region of Croatia connecting Baranjsko Petrovo Selo and the D517 state road to the nearby border crossing to Beremend, Hungary. The road is 2.0 km (1.2 mi) long.

Like all other state roads in Croatia, the D211 is managed and maintained by Hrvatske ceste, state owned company.

== Road junctions and populated areas ==
D211 junctions/populated areas
Type	Slip roads/Notes
	Baranjsko Petrovo Selo border crossing to Hungary. The route extends to Beremend, Hungary. The northern terminus of the road.
	Baranjsko Petrovo Selo; D517 to Beli Manastir (D7) (to the east) and to Belišće and Valpovo (D34) (to the west). The southern terminus of the road.
