= Širine =

- Village (Selo)
- Location within Osijek-Baranja County Location within Croatia Location within Europe
- Coordinates: 45°46′07″N 18°33′38″E
- Country: Croatia
- Region: Baranya
- County: Osijek-Baranja
- Municipality: Petlovac

Area
  - Total: 0.85 sq mi (2.2 km^{2})
- Elevation: 299 ft (91 m)

Population (2021)
  - Total: 26
  - Density: 31/sq mi (12/km^{2})
- Time zone: UTC+1 (CET)
  - Summer (DST): UTC+2 (CEST)
- Postal code: 31300 Beli Manastir
- Area code: (+385) 31

Širine (Hungarian: Braidaföld, Serbian Cyrillic: Ширине) is a settlement in the region of Baranja, Croatia. Administratively, it is located in the Petlovac municipality within the Osijek-Baranja County. Population is 58 people.

== History ==
Širine has existed as part of the settlement from 1869. It was formally established as an independent settlement in 1991, when it was separated from the territory of Šumarina.

== Population ==
Population data graph 1857.-2011.
v

population		121			194	190			537	322	306	311	219	170	86	58
	1857	1869	1880	1890	1900	1910	1921	1931	1948	1953	1961	1971	1981	1991	2001	2011

Sources: Croatian Bureau of Statistics publications

== Ethnic composition, 1991. census ==
Širine
1991
total: 170
1. Croats 70 (41.2%)
2. Yugoslavs 25 (14.7%)
3. Hungarians 20 (11.8%)
4. Serbs 18 (10.6%)
5. Germans 14 (8.23%)
6. Slovenes 12 (7.05%)
7. Montenegrins 4 (2.35%)
8. Albanians 1 (0.58%)
9. Turks 1 (0.58%)
10. ethnically undeclared 3 (1.76%)
11. regionaly declared 2 (1.17%)

== Literature ==
- Book: "Narodnosni i vjerski sastav stanovništva Hrvatske, 1880–1991: po naseljima, author: Jakov Gelo, izdavač: Državni zavod za statistiku Republike Hrvatske, 1998., ISBN 953-6667-07-X, ISBN 978-953-6667-07-9;

== See also ==
- Osijek-Baranja county
- Baranja
