= Petlovac =

- Municipality
- Municipality of Petlovac; Općina Petlovac
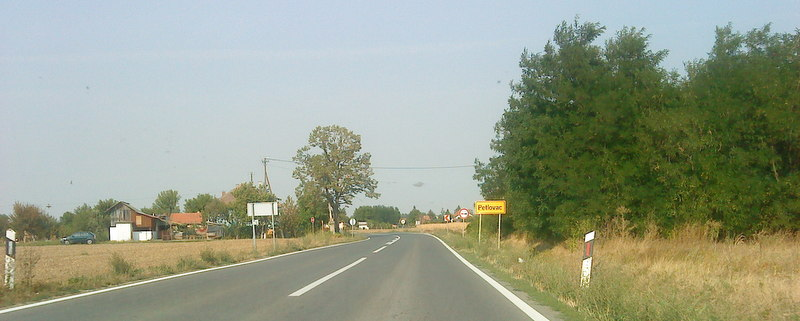

- Flag Coat of arms

- Location of Petlovac in Croatia Petlovac (Croatia) Petlovac (Europe)
- Coordinates: 45°45′31″N 18°31′41″E
- Country: Croatia
- Region: Baranja (Podunavlje)
- County: Osijek-Baranja County

Government
  - Municipal mayor: Milan Knežević

Area
  - Municipality: 93.6 km^{2} (36.1 sq mi)
  - Urban: 17.6 km^{2} (6.8 sq mi)
- Elevation: 90 m (300 ft)

Population (2021)
  - Municipality: 1,874
  - Density: 20.0/km^{2} (51.9/sq mi)
  - Urban: 532
  - Urban density: 30.2/km^{2} (78.3/sq mi)
- Time zone: UTC+1 (CET)
  - Summer (DST): UTC+2 (CEST)
- Postal codes: 31321 Petlovac
- Area code: (+385) 31
- Website: petlovac.hr

Petlovac (Hungarian: Baranyaszentistván, German: Sanktivan, Serbian Cyrillic: Петловац) is a village and municipality in the western part of Baranja, which comprise the northern part of Osijek-Baranja County in Croatia. Petlovac is underdeveloped municipality which is statistically classified as the First Category Area of Special State Concern by the Government of Croatia.

Until the end of World War II, the majority of the inhabitants was Danube Swabian, also called locally as Stifolder, because their ancestors arrived in the 17th and 18th centuries from Fulda (district). Most of the former German settlers were expelled to Allied-occupied Germany and Allied-occupied Austria in 1945-1948, as a result of the Potsdam Agreement.

== Name ==
Its name derived from the word "petao" (which means "rooster" in English). The village had different names in history. During Hungarian rule, it was called Sent Ištvan (Saint Stephen), and German settlers named it Blumendorf, which means Village of Flowers.

== Municipality of Petlovac ==
=== Population ===
Population data graph 1857.-2011.
v

population	3734	4328	4181	4294	4784	4803	4605	4765	5607	5153	5303	4930	3949	3785	2743	2405
	1857	1869	1880	1890	1900	1910	1921	1931	1948	1953	1961	1971	1981	1991	2001	2011

Sources: Croatian Bureau of Statistics publications

Municipality of Petlovac has 2,405 inhabitants (2011 census), including:

- 73.22% Croats
- 13.72% Hungarians
- 5.07% Serbs
- 4.53% Romani

=== Geography ===
It is located between border with Hungary in the north-west, Baranja municipalities of Beli Manastir and Jagodnjak in the east and Slavonia region in the south-west.

The municipality of Petlovac include following settlements:

- Petlovac
- Baranjsko Petrovo Selo
- Luč
- Novi Bezdan
- Novo Nevesinje
- Sudaraž
- Širine
- Torjanci
- Zeleno Polje

== Politics ==
=== Minority councils ===
Directly elected minority councils and representatives are tasked with consulting tasks for the local or regional authorities in which they are advocating for minority rights and interests, integration into public life and participation in the management of local affairs. At the 2023 Croatian national minorities councils and representatives elections Hungarians, Roma and Serbs of Croatia each fulfilled legal requirements to elect 10 members municipal minority councils of the Petlovac Municipality but the elections for Serb council were not held due to the lack of candidates.

== Petlovac (settlement) ==
=== History ===
Till 1991. part of settlement was Zeleno Polje which is now independent settlement.

=== Population ===
Population data graph 1857.-2011.
v

population	820	864	846	882	927	962	1196	1244	869	906	1167	1000	940	1012	801	714
	1857	1869	1880	1890	1900	1910	1921	1931	1948	1953	1961	1971	1981	1991	2001	2011

Sources: Croatian Bureau of Statistics publications

=== Ethnic composition, 1991. census ===
Petlovac
1991
total: 1,012
1. Croats 843 (83.3%)
2. Serbs 51 (5.03%)
3. Yugoslavs 37 (3.65%)
4. Hungarians 25 (2.47%)
5. Slovenes 11 (1.08%)
6. Montenegrins 7 (0.69%)
7. Germans 5 (0.49%)
8. ethnic Muslims 1 (0.09%)
9. ethnically undeclared 15 (1.48%)
10. unknown 17 (1.67%)

== Austria-Hungary 1910. census ==
Petlovac
Population by ethnicity	Population by religion
total: 962: 1. Germans 927 (96.4%); 2. Hungarians 28 (2.91%); 3. Serbs 4 (0.41%); 4. others 3 (0.31%)	total: 962: 1. Roman Catholics 944 (98.1%); 2. jewish 10 (1.03%); 3. eastern orthodox 5 (0.51%); 4. calvinists 3 (0.31%)

- In 1910. census together with settlement Zeleno Polje.

== Literature ==
- Book: "Narodnosni i vjerski sastav stanovništva Hrvatske, 1880–1991: po naseljima, autor: Jakov Gelo, izdavač: Državni zavod za statistiku Republike Hrvatske, 1998., ISBN 953-6667-07-X, ISBN 978-953-6667-07-9;
