= Šećerana =

Šećerana may refer to:

- Šećerana, Beli Manastir, a settlement in Beli Manastir municipality, Croatia
- Šećerana, Zrenjanin, a neighborhood in Zrenjanin, Serbia
