= Seecheran =

Seecheran is a surname. Notable people with the surname include:

- Clem Seecharan (born 1950), Guyanese writer
- Rishad Seecheran, Trinidad and Tobago politician

== See also ==
- Šećerana (disambiguation)
