= Croatian Romani Union "Kali Sara" =

- Romani name: Rromengi Unia Ani Kroacia "Kali Sara"
- Croatian name: Savez Roma u Republici Hrvatskoj "Kali Sara"
- Abbreviation: Kali Sara
- Leader (Note: Also representative in Sabor of the Roma and eleven other minorities such as Austrians, Bulgarians, Germans, Poles, Romanians, Ruthenians, Russians, Turks, Ukrainians, Vlachs and Jews): Veljko Kajtazi
- Founded: 2011; 15 years ago (Note: As "Centre for the Implementation of Integration into the European Union")
- Headquarters: Zagreb, Croatia
- Ideology: Romani minority interests
- Political position: Centre
- Colours: Red
- Sabor: 1 / 151

Party flag

Website
- kalisara.hr

Croatian Romani Union "Kali Sara" (as organization)
- Formation: July 2007; 19 years ago
- Type: National coordination of the Romani people in Croatia
- Legal status: Minority self-government organization

The Croatian Romani Union "Kali Sara" (Croatian: Savez Roma u Republici Hrvatskoj "Kali Sara", Romani: Rromengi Unia Ani Kroacia "Kali Sara") is a political and self-government organization of the Romani people in Croatia. Its seat is located in Croatian capital city of Zagreb.

== History ==
The organization was established in July 2007 and its first president was Veljko Kajtazi, future member of the Croatian Parliament. On the occasion of publication of the first Romani-Croatian dictionary in 2008, the Alliance initiated the signing of the Charter of the Romani Language which was signed by 157 individuals. On the date of the publication of the dictionary on November 5 (authored by the Alliance's president), the local and international Roma community celebrated the World Day of Romani Language. The Croatian Parliament formally recognized Romani Language Day on May 25, 2012. In 2015 UNESCO accepted the alliance's initiative to recognize the Romani language as a part of global cultural heritage by recognizing the World Day of Romani Language. The formal proposal to UNESCO was made by the Republic of Croatia. In 2018, the Alliance published the monograph "Kali Sara - The First Ten Years".

== Electoral performance ==
Sabor
Year	Popular vote	% of vote	Overall seats won	Others seat (Note: Other seats in the Sabor are for Roma and eleven other minorities such as Austrians, Bulgarians, Germans, Poles, Romanians, Ruthenians, Russians, Turks, Ukrainians, Vlachs and Jews)	Seat change	Government
As "Centre for the Implementation of Integration into the European Union"
2011	863	18.88	1 / 151	1 / 1	▲1	Government support
As "Croatian Romani Union "Kali Sara"
2015	1.913	41.41	1 / 151	1 / 1	Steady	Government support
2015	1.913	41.41	1 / 151	1 / 1	Steady	Opposition
2016	2.010	53.16	1 / 151	1 / 1	Steady	Government support
2020	3.745	78.48	1 / 151	1 / 1	Steady	Government support
2024	3.017	62.11	1 / 151	1 / 1	Steady	Government support

== See also ==
- Minority languages of Croatia
- Rights of the Roma in the European Union
- Roma Memorial Center Uštica
