= Uštica =

- Village
- Interactive map of Uštica
- Location in Croatia
- Coordinates: 45°15′47″N 16°54′18″E
- Country: Croatia
- Region: Continental Croatia
- County: Sisak-Moslavina
- Municipality: Jasenovac

Area
  - Total: 2.6 km^{2} (1.0 sq mi)
- Elevation: 93 m (305 ft)

Population (2021)
  - Total: 118
  - Density: 45/km^{2} (120/sq mi)
- Time zone: UTC+1 (CET)
  - Summer (DST): UTC+2 (CEST)
- Postal code: 44324 Jasenovac
- Area code: (+385) 44

Uštica is a village in central Croatia, in the municipality of Jasenovac, Sisak-Moslavina County.

It is located just west of the confluence of the Una into the Sava, and connected by the D47 highway to Jasenovac in the north, and Dubica in the southwest. Across the border with Bosnia is the village of Donja Gradina.

== Demographics ==
According to the 2011 census, the village of Uštica has 177 inhabitants. This represents 38.15% of its pre-war population.

By 1991 census, 234 of its residents were ethnic Serbs (50.43%), 213 were ethnic Croats (45.90%), 6 were Yugoslavs (1.29%), 1 was Muslim (0.21%), 1 Montenegrin (0.21%) and 9 were of other ethnic origin (1.93%).

Population change 1857–2011
v

population	960	1129	1155	1216	1126	1194	968	999	754	766	744	639	554	464	214	177
	1857	1869	1880	1890	1900	1910	1921	1931	1948	1953	1961	1971	1981	1991	2001	2011

Sources: Croatian Bureau of Statistics publications

== Sights ==
- Monument and memorial to the victims of the Jasenovac concentration camp
- Roma Memorial Center Uštica
