= Luč =

- Village (Selo)
- Location within Osijek-Baranja County Location within Croatia Location within Europe
- Coordinates: 45°47′07″N 18°32′08″E
- Country: Croatia
- Region: Baranya
- County: Osijek-Baranja
- Municipality: Petlovac

Area
  - Total: 3.6 sq mi (9.4 km^{2})
- Elevation: 300 ft (90 m)

Population (2021)
  - Total: 322
  - Density: 89/sq mi (34/km^{2})
- Time zone: UTC+1 (CET)
  - Summer (DST): UTC+2 (CEST)
- Postal code: 31300 Beli Manastir
- Area code: (+385) 31

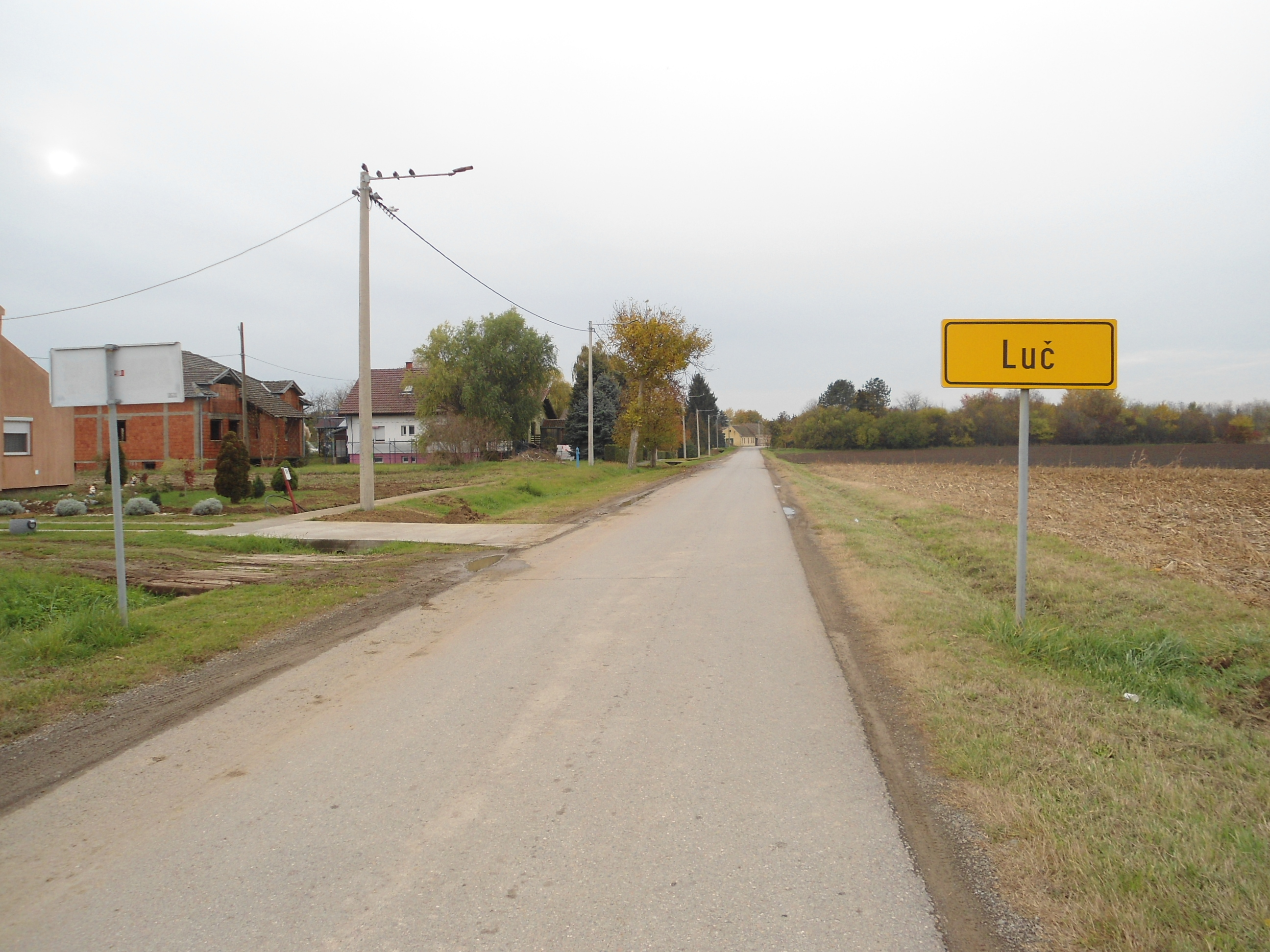
A street in Luc.

Luč (Hungarian: Lőcs, German: Lutsch, Serbian Cyrillic: Луч) is a settlement in the Petlovac municipality of Osijek-Baranja County in the region of Baranya, Croatia. The population was 322 people in 2011.

Until the end of World War II the most inhabitants were German Danube Swabians, also known locally as Stifolder because their ancestors arrived in the 17th and 18th centuries from Fulda (district). Most of them were expelled to Allied-occupied Germany and Allied-occupied Austria in 1945–1948 under the Potsdam Agreement.

== Population ==
Population data graph 1857.-2021.
v

| population | 1226 | 1172 | 1119 | 1133 | 1111 | 1138 | 1050 | 1076 | 1014 | 947 | 987 | 896 | 726 | 735 | 487 | 435 | 322 |
| | 1857 | 1869 | 1880 | 1890 | 1900 | 1910 | 1921 | 1931 | 1948 | 1953 | 1961 | 1971 | 1981 | 1991 | 2001 | 2011 | 2021 |

Sources: Croatian Bureau of Statistics publications

== Ethnic composition, 1991. census ==
Luč
1991
total: 735
1. Croats 615 (83.7%)
2. Yugoslavs 54 (7.34%)
3. Serbs 31 (4.21%)
4. Hungarians 9 (1.22%)
5. Slovenes 8 (1.08%)
6. Albanians 4 (0.54%)
7. Ruthenians 3 (0.40%)
8. Germans 2 (0.27%)
9. Montenegrins 2 (0.27%)
10. ethnic Muslims 1 (0.13%)
11. ethnically undeclared 4 (0.54%)
12. unknown 2 (0.27%)

== Austria-Hungary 1910. census ==
Luč
| Population by ethnicity | Population by religion |
| total: 1,138: 1. Šokci 730 (64.1%); 2. Germans 276 (24.2%); 3. Hungarians 107 (9.40%); 4. Slovaks 18 (1.58%); 5. Serbs 6 (0.52%); 6. Croats 1 (0.08%) | total: 1,138: 1. Roman Catholics 1,115 (98.0%); 2. Jewish 13 (1.14%); 3. Eastern Orthodox 6 (0.52%); 4. Calvinists 4 (0.35%) |

== Bibliography ==
- Book: "Narodnosni i vjerski sastav stanovništva Hrvatske, 1880–1991: po naseljima, author: Jakov Gelo, izdavač: Državni zavod za statistiku Republike Hrvatske, 1998., ISBN 953-6667-07-X, ISBN 978-953-6667-07-9;
