= Harkanovci =

- Village (Selo)
- Location within Osijek-Baranja County Location within Croatia Location within Europe
- Country: Croatia
- County: Osijek-Baranja
- Municipality: Valpovo

Area
  - Total: 31.1 km^{2} (12.0 sq mi)

Population (2021)
  - Total: 400
  - Density: 13/km^{2} (33/sq mi)
- Time zone: UTC+1 (CET)
  - Summer (DST): UTC+2 (CEST)

Harkanovci is a village in Croatia. It is connected by the D517 highway. Until the end of the World War II, the majority of the inhabitants were Danube Swabians, some of them came around 1865 - 1880 from Tolna County (former)-Hungary, who named the village once Kawinz. Most of the former German settlers were expelled to Allied-occupied Germany and Allied-occupied Austria in 1946-1948, following the Potsdam Agreement. Some of them went then to USA, Canada and Australia in the 1950s. Today few Germans of Croatia live there.
