= Ivanovci, Osijek-Baranja County =

Ivanovci
- Village (Selo)
- Location within Osijek-Baranja County Location within Croatia Location within Europe
- Country: Croatia
- County: Osijek-Baranja
- Town: Valpovo

Area
  - Total: 11.7 km^{2} (4.5 sq mi)

Population (2021)
  - Total: 405
  - Density: 34.6/km^{2} (89.7/sq mi)
- Time zone: UTC+1 (CET)
  - Summer (DST): UTC+2 (CEST)

Ivanovci is a village in Croatia. It is connected by the D517 highway.
