= Roma Memorial Center Uštica =

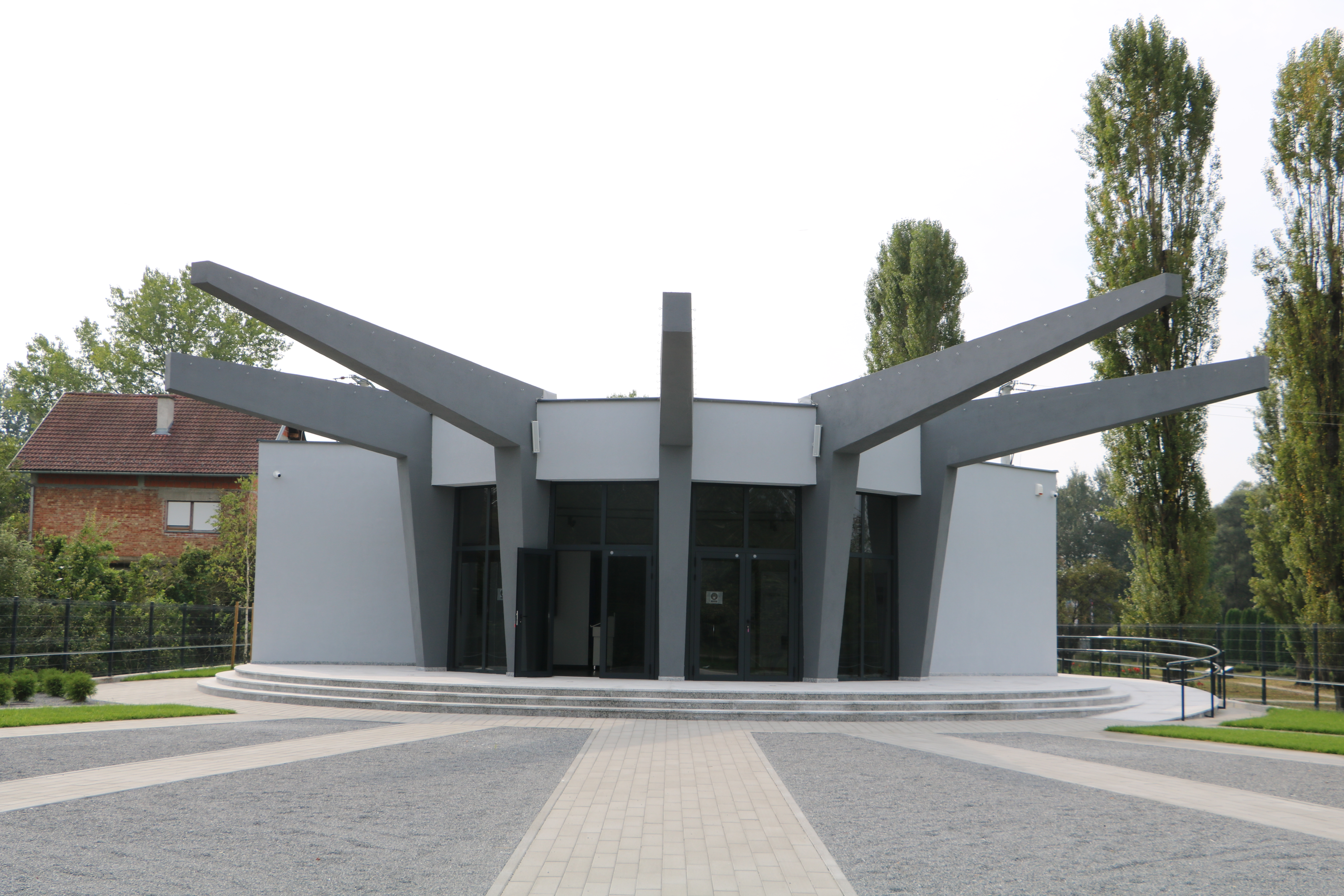
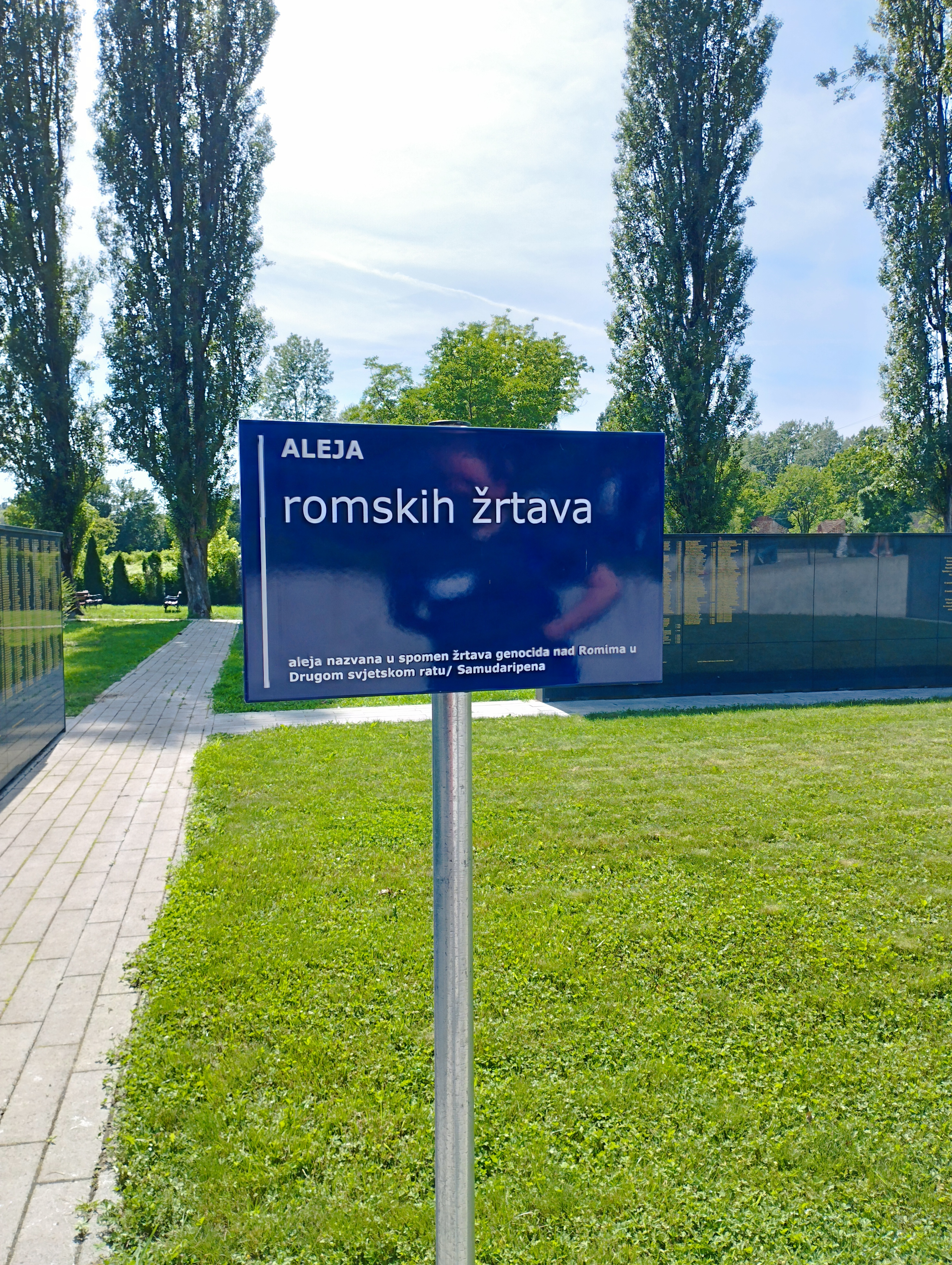
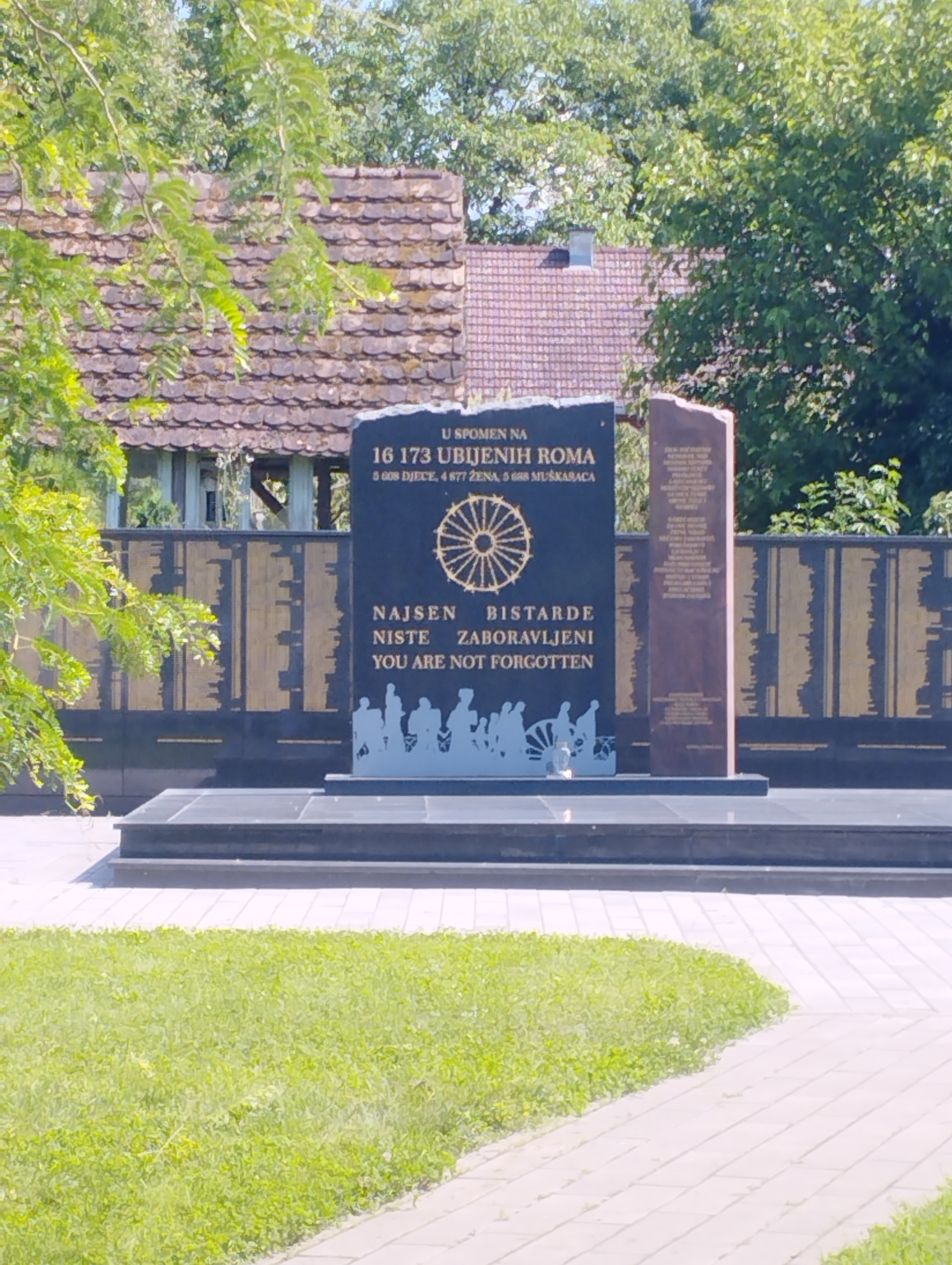
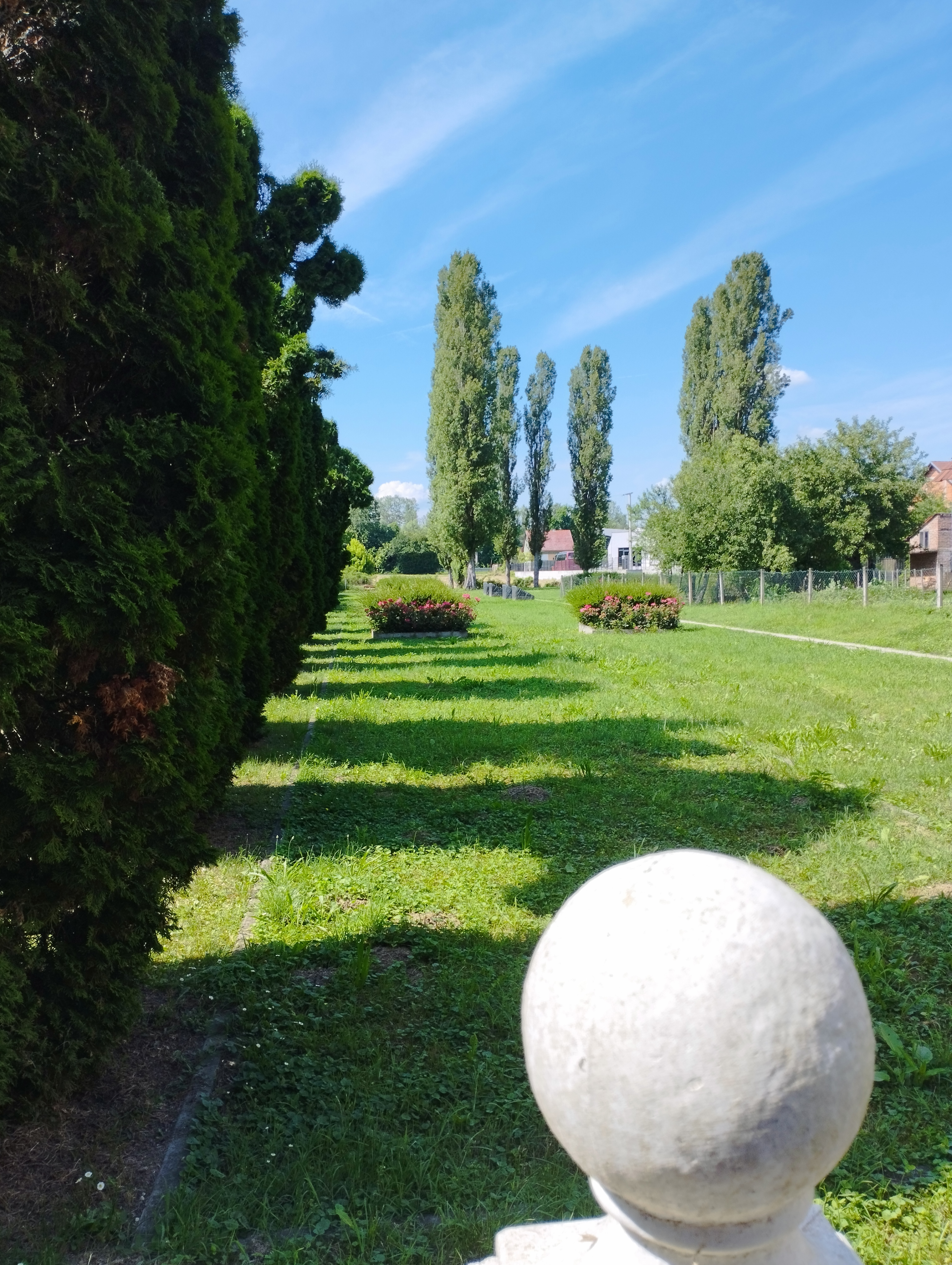
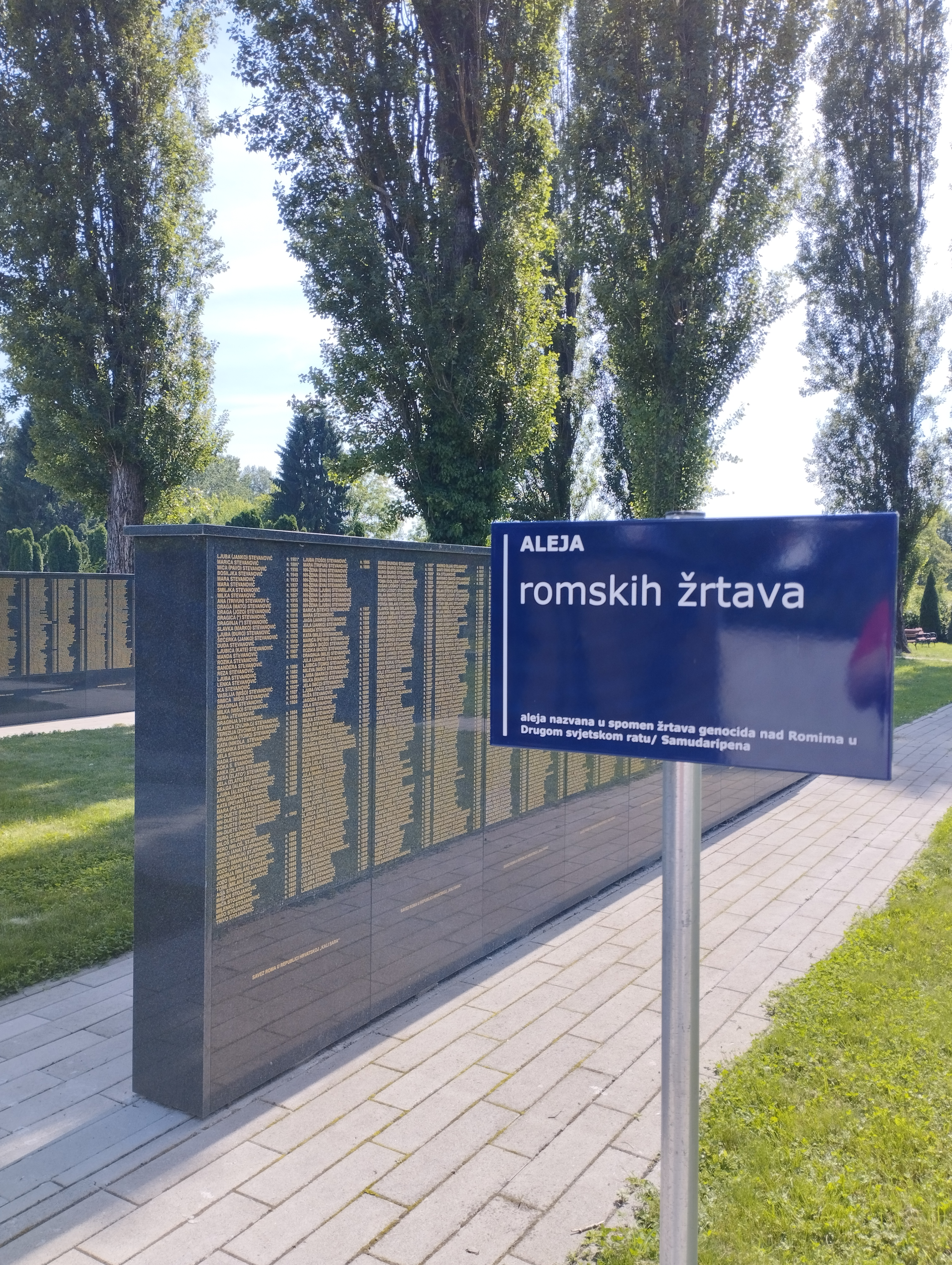
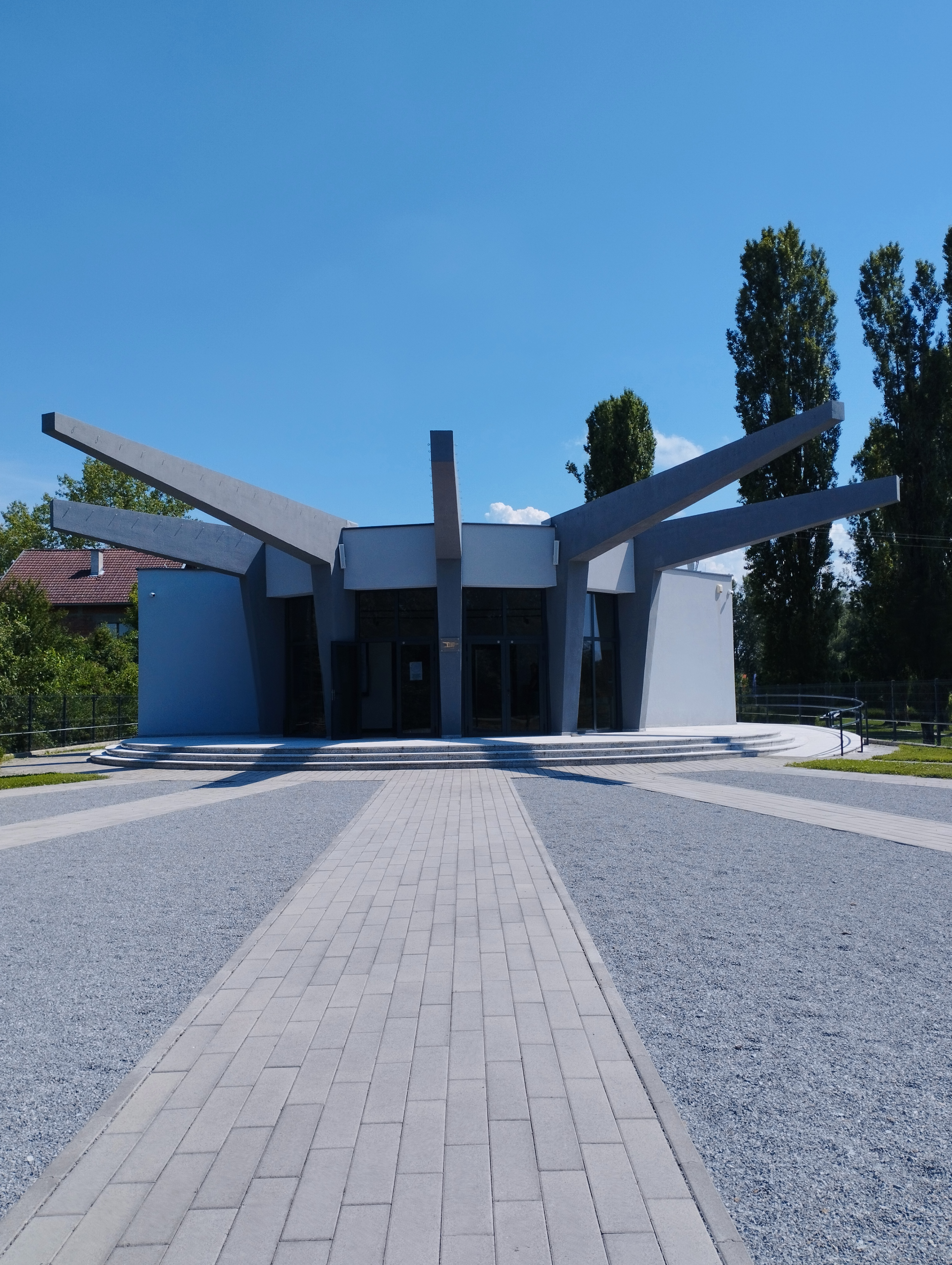
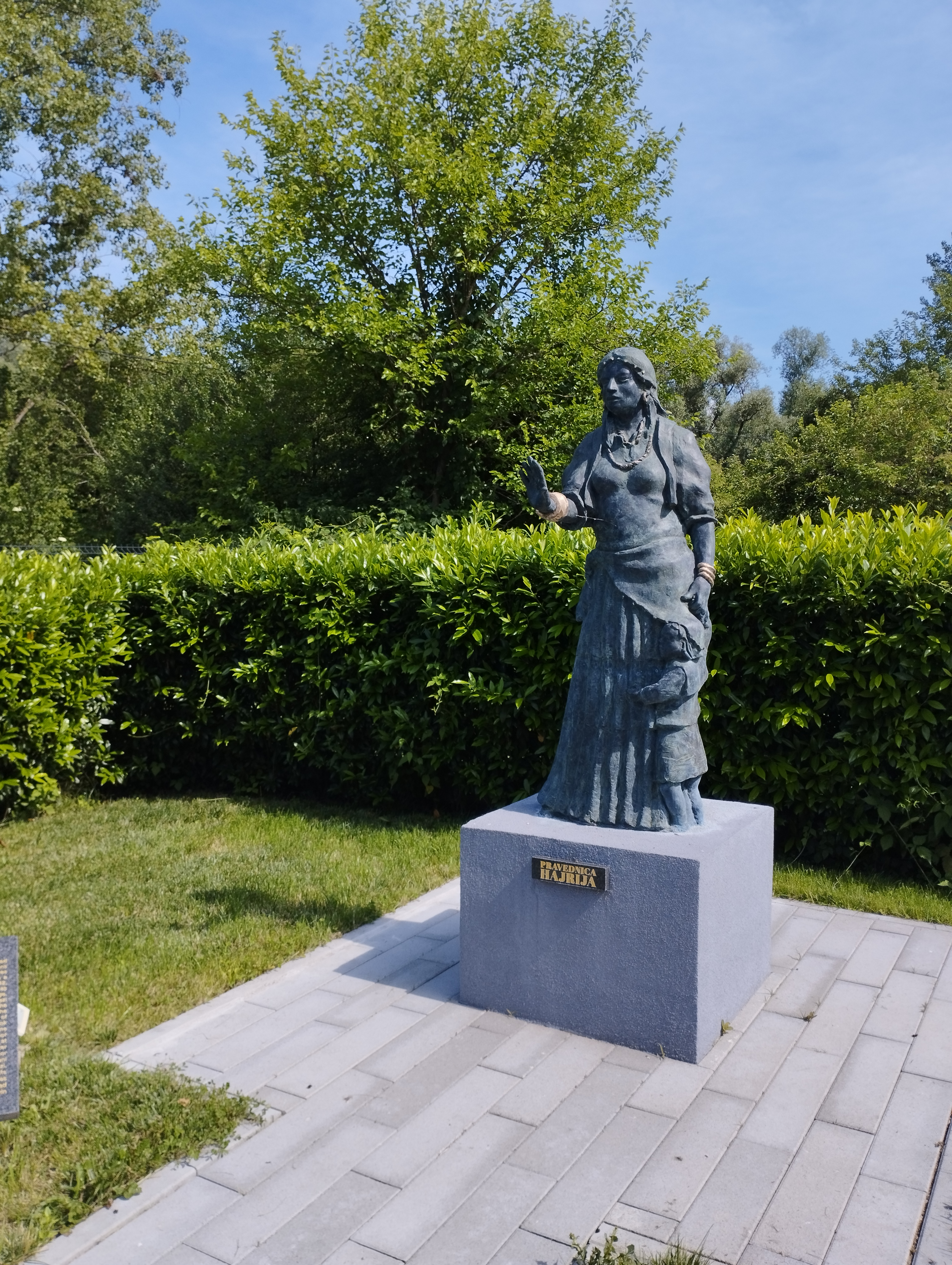
- Interactive map of Roma Memorial Center Uštica
- Location: Uštica, Croatia
- Coordinates: 45°15′44″N 16°54′1″E
- Type: Genocide memorial
- Website: rmcu.hr

The Roma Memorial Center Uštica commemorates the Romani victims of genocide in Croatia during World War II. Uštica, located near Jasenovac, where thousands of Roma were executed by the Ustaše regime, the site was largely neglected until recent years. Initially marked by a memorial plaque in 1971, the area gained renewed attention in 2012, leading to efforts by the Croatian Romani Union "Kali Sara" to establish a permanent museum. Opened on August 2, 2020, the center serves as a site of remembrance and education, coinciding with the International Roma Genocide Remembrance Day. Uštica, situated approximately 110 km southeast of Zagreb, was a site of mass executions where Roma deported to the Jasenovac concentration camp by the Ustaše regime of the Independent State of Croatia during the World War II.

== History ==
The exact number of Roma killed under the Nazi-allied Ustasa regime in the Independent State of Croatia remains unknown. Estimates from the Jasenovac Memorial Site suggest over 16,000 victims, but the true figure is likely higher. The Roma genocide has been largely overlooked, both during and after the war. The post-war Yugoslav Communist authorities emphasized "brotherhood and unity," downplaying ethnic-specific victimhood.

The Uštica site, part of the Jasenovac Memorial Area, was opened in July 1971 with the installation of a memorial plaque. The area covers 4,700 m² and contains 21 mass graves with the remains of most of the 16,173 Roma victims identified by name, who were murdered within the Jasenovac concentration camp system.

Despite its historical significance, no commemorations were held at Uštica until 2012. In 2011, representatives of the Croatian Romani Union "Kali Sara", including its then-president Veljko Kajtazi, visited the site and found it in a neglected state. In 2014, Kajtazi, as a member of the Croatian Parliament, successfully proposed the recognition of August 2 as the International Day of Remembrance for Roma Genocide Victims. In 2018, in collaboration with the Government of Croatia and the City of Zagreb, Kali Sara launched campaign to establish the Roma Memorial Centre Uštica as a permanent museum. The Roma Memorial Center Uštica was inaugurated on August 2, 2020, to mark the International Roma Genocide Remembrance Day. The center was officially opened by Suzana Krčmar, Veljko Kajtazi and Milan Bandić with presence of religious leaders from Serbian Orthodox Church, Roman Catholic Church and Muslim community.

== See also ==
- Romani people in Croatia
