= Zelčin =

- Village (Selo)
- Location within Osijek-Baranja County Location within Croatia
- Country: Croatia
- County: Osijek-Baranja
- Municipality: Valpovo

Area
  - Total: 10.6 km^{2} (4.1 sq mi)

Population (2021)
  - Total: 297
  - Density: 28.0/km^{2} (72.6/sq mi)
- Time zone: UTC+1 (CET)
  - Summer (DST): UTC+2 (CEST)

Zelčin is a village in Croatia. It is connected by the D517 highway.
