= Sudaraž =

- Village (Selo)
- Location within Osijek-Baranja County Location within Croatia Location within Europe
- Coordinates: 45°44′59″N 18°34′20″E
- Country: Croatia
- Region: Baranya
- County: Osijek-Baranja
- Municipality: Petlovac

Area
  - Total: 0.077 sq mi (0.2 km^{2})
- Elevation: 300 ft (90 m)

Population (2021)
  - Total: 0
  - Density: 0.0/sq mi (0.0/km^{2})
- Time zone: UTC+1 (CET)
  - Summer (DST): UTC+2 (CEST)
- Postal code: 31300 Beli Manastir
- Area code: (+385) 31

Sudaraž (Hungarian: Szudarázs, Serbian Cyrillic: Судараж) is an uninhabited settlement in the region of Baranja, Croatia. Administratively, it is located in the Petlovac municipality within the Osijek-Baranja County.

== History ==
Sudaraž has existed as part of the settlement from 1880. Its name was Sudaraš from 1880-1991. It was formally established as an independent settlement in 1991, when it was separated from the territory of Beli Manastir.

== Population ==
Population data graph 1857.-2011.
v

population					108	141			270	285	240	261
	1857	1869	1880	1890	1900	1910	1921	1931	1948	1953	1961	1971	1981	1991	2001	2011

Sources: Croatian Bureau of Statistics publications

== Literature ==
- Book: "Narodnosni i vjerski sastav stanovništva Hrvatske, 1880-1991: po naseljima, author: Jakov Gelo, izdavač: Državni zavod za statistiku Republike Hrvatske, 1998., ISBN 953-6667-07-X, ISBN 978-953-6667-07-9;
