= Novi Bezdan =

Novi Bezdan Újbezdán
- Village (Selo)
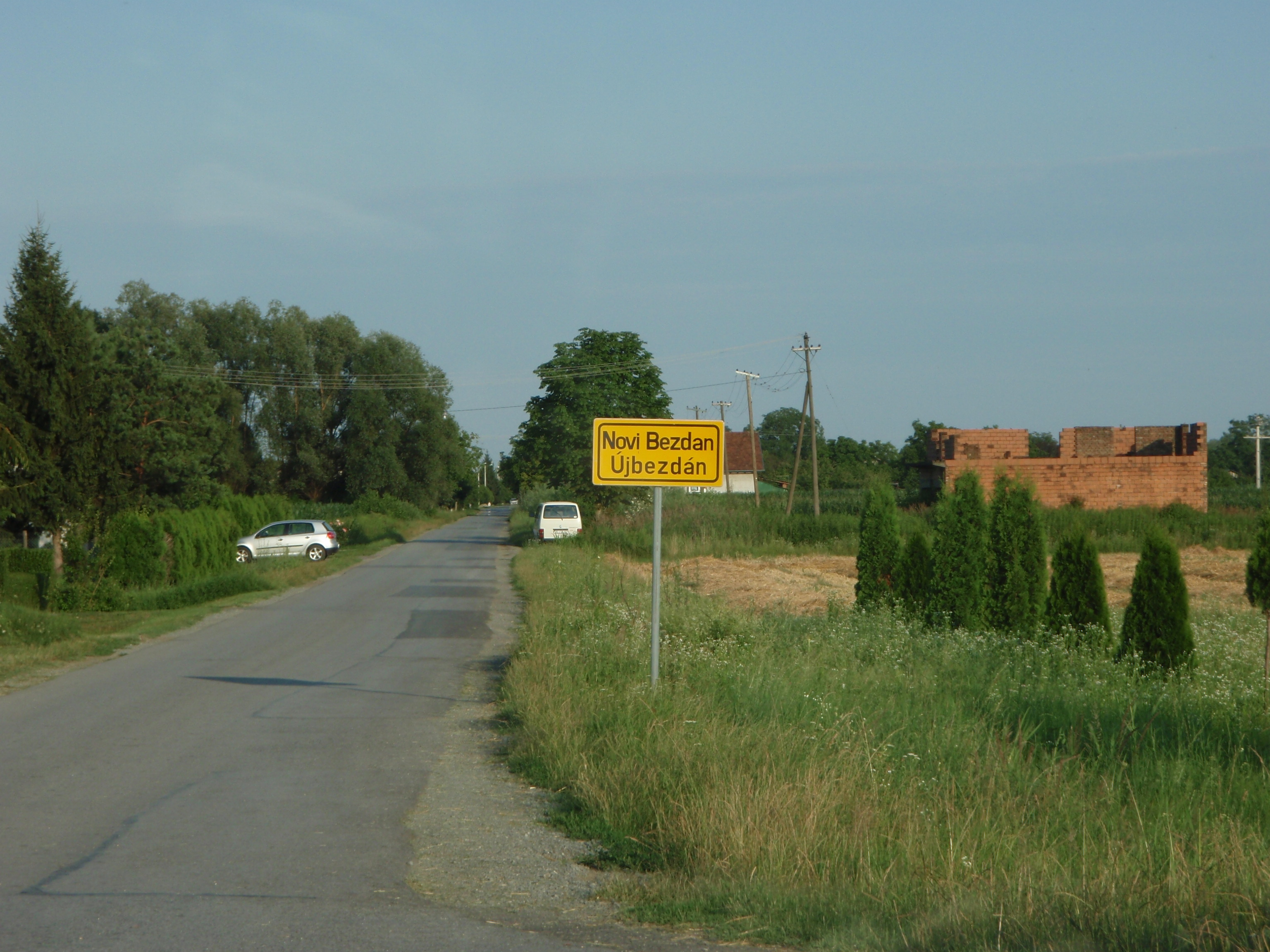

- Location within Osijek-Baranja County Location within Croatia Location within Europe
- Coordinates: 45°44′17″N 18°27′52″E
- Country: Croatia
- Region: Baranya
- County: Osijek-Baranja
- Municipality: Petlovac

Area
  - Total: 2.0 sq mi (5.2 km^{2})
- Elevation: 276 ft (84 m)

Population (2021)
  - Total: 262
  - Density: 130/sq mi (50/km^{2})
- Time zone: UTC+1 (CET)
  - Summer (DST): UTC+2 (CEST)
- Postal code: 31322 Baranjsko Petrovo Selo
- Area code: (+385) 31

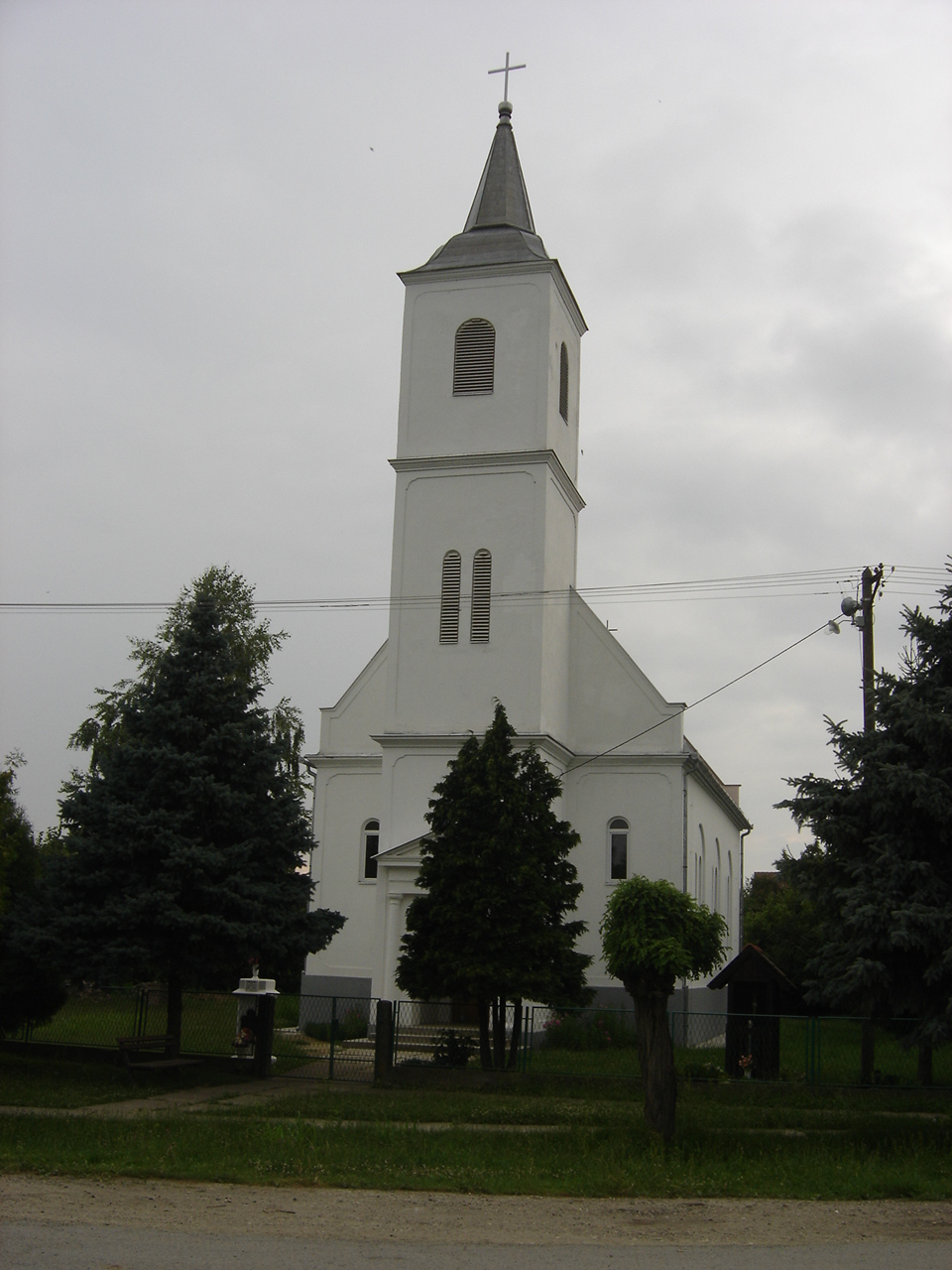
Roman Catholic church "St. Michael"

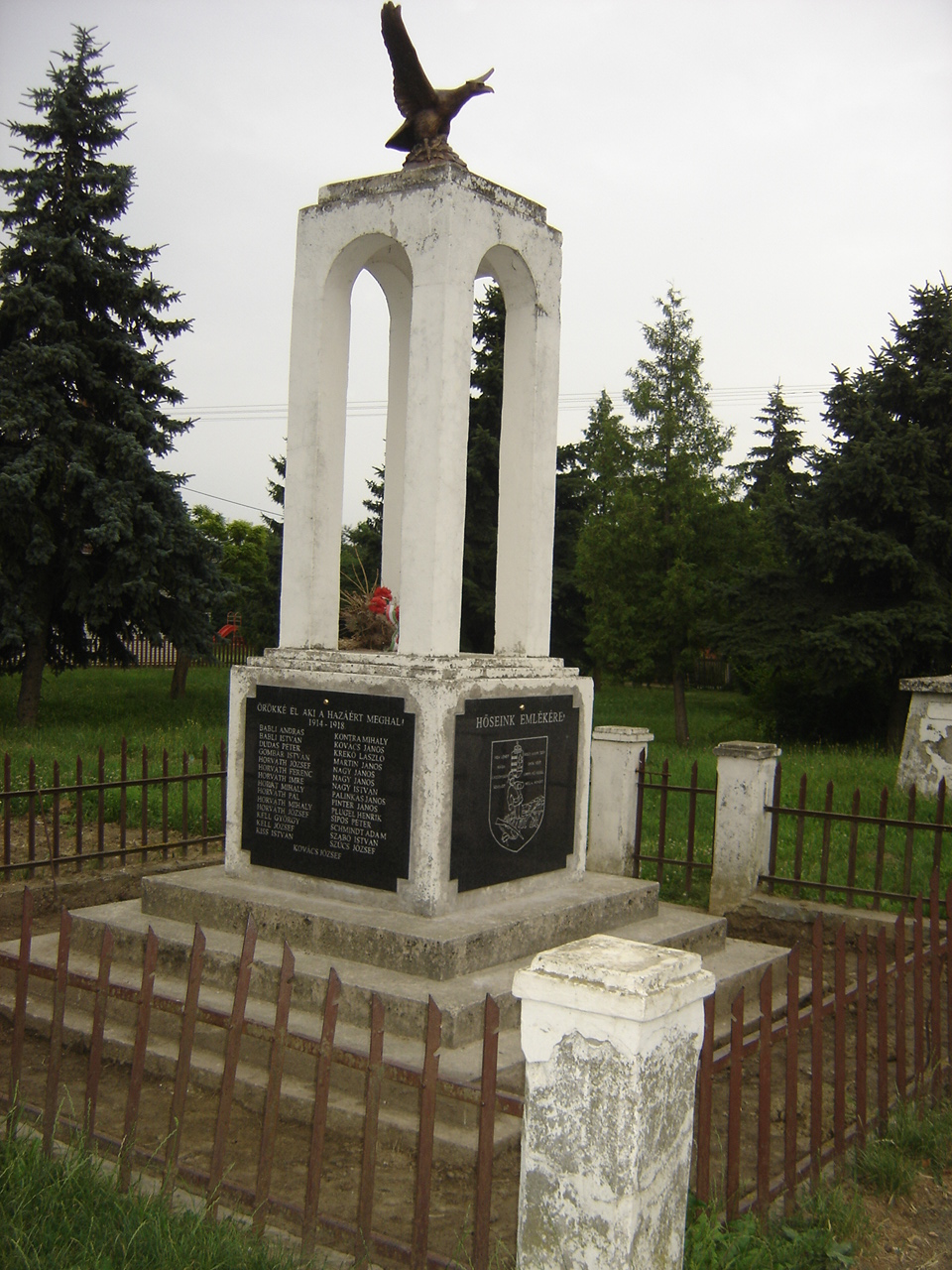
Monument to World War II victims

Novi Bezdan (Hungarian: Újbezdán) is a settlement in the region of Baranja, Croatia. Administratively, it is located in the Petlovac municipality within the Osijek-Baranja County. Population is 300 people.

== Population ==
Population data graph 1857.-2011.
v

population		415	521	511	608	596	681	624	600	592	541	520	444	376	329	300
	1857	1869	1880	1890	1900	1910	1921	1931	1948	1953	1961	1971	1981	1991	2001	2011

Sources: Croatian Bureau of Statistics publications

== Ethnic composition, 1991. census ==
Novi Bezdan
1991
total: 376
1. Hungarians 329 (87.5%)
2. Croats 20 (5.31%)
3. Serbs 3 (0.79%)
4. ethnically undeclared 4 (1.06%)
5. unknown 20 (5.31%)

== Austria-Hungary 1910. census ==
Novi Bezdan
Population by ethnicity	Population by religion
total: 596: 1. Hungarians 585 (98.2%); 2. Germans 11 (1.84%)	total: 596: 1. Roman Catholics 575 (96.5%); 2. jewish 5 (0.83%); 3. others 16 (2.68%)

== Literature ==
- Book: "Narodnosni i vjerski sastav stanovništva Hrvatske, 1880–1991: po naseljima, autor: Jakov Gelo, izdavač: Državni zavod za statistiku Republike Hrvatske, 1998., ISBN 953-6667-07-X, ISBN 978-953-6667-07-9;

== See also ==
- Osijek-Baranja county
- Baranja
