= Zeleno Polje =

- Village (Selo)
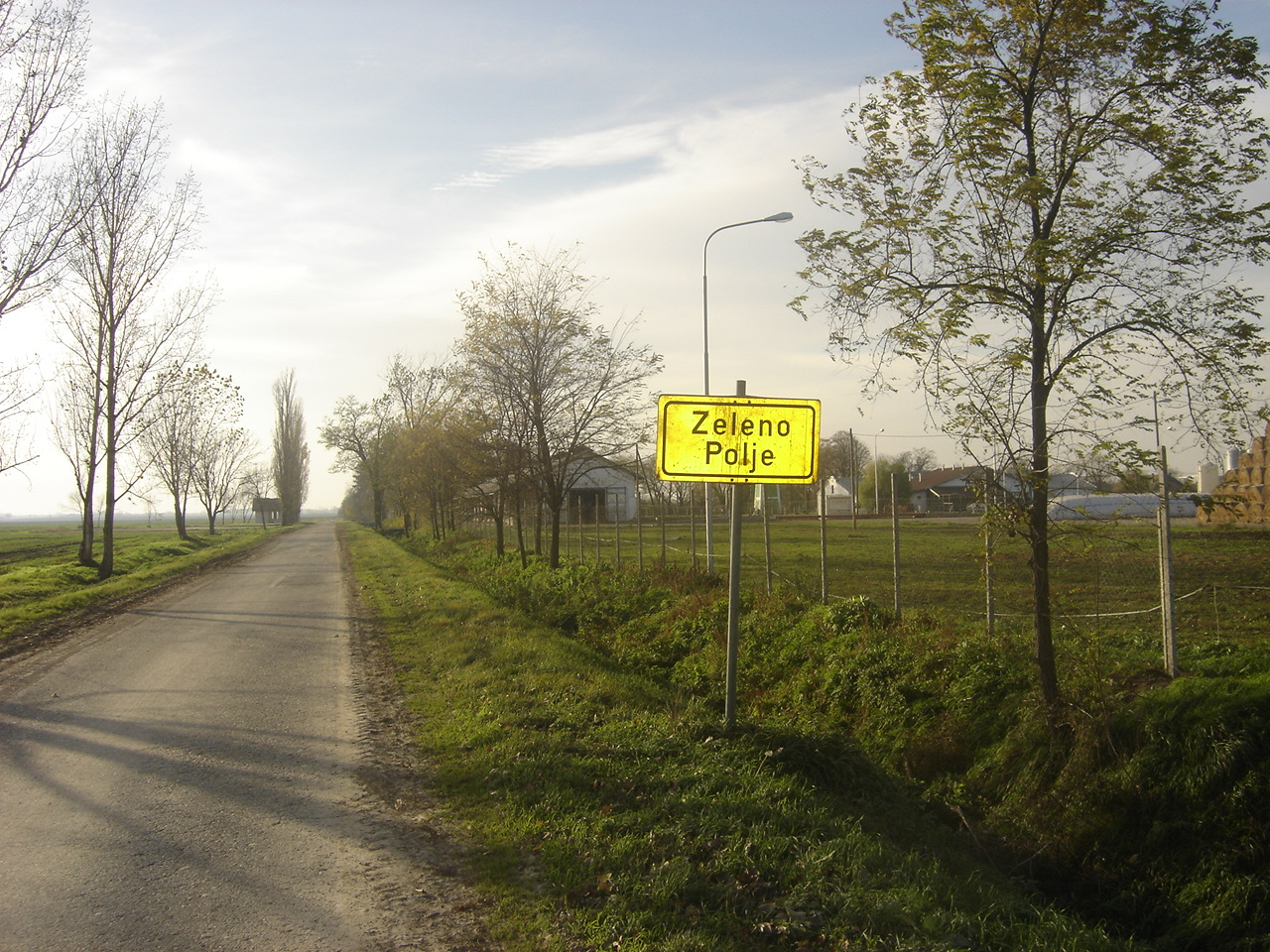
- Zeleno Polje in 2010

- Location within Osijek-Baranja County Location within Croatia Location within Europe
- Coordinates: 45°46′13″N 18°30′14″E
- Country: Croatia
- Region: Baranya
- County: Osijek-Baranja
- Municipality: Petlovac

Area
  - Total: 0.15 sq mi (0.4 km^{2})
- Elevation: 299 ft (91 m)

Population (2021)
  - Total: 13
  - Density: 84/sq mi (33/km^{2})
- Time zone: UTC+1 (CET)
  - Summer (DST): UTC+2 (CEST)
- Postal code: 31321 Petlovac
- Area code: (+385) 31

Zeleno Polje (Hungarian: Szentistvánpuszta, Serbian Cyrillic: Зелено Поље) is a settlement in the region of Baranja, Croatia. Administratively, it is located in the Petlovac municipality within the Osijek-Baranja County. Population is 43 people.

== History ==
Zeleno Polje has existed as part of the settlement from 1948. It was formally established as an independent settlement in 1991, when it was separated from the territory of Petlovac.

== Population ==
Population data graph 1857.-2011.
v

population									358	278	252	277	178	122	80	43
	1857	1869	1880	1890	1900	1910	1921	1931	1948	1953	1961	1971	1981	1991	2001	2011

Sources: Croatian Bureau of Statistics publications

== Ethnic composition, 1991. census ==
Zeleno Polje
1991
total: 122
1. Croats 73 (59.8%)
2. Serbs 30 (24.6%)
3. Yugoslavs 9 (7.37%)
4. Slovenes 7 (5.73%)
5. Germans 1 (0.81%)
6. Hungarians 1 (0.81%)
7. unknown 1 (0.81%)

== Literature ==
- Book: "Narodnosni i vjerski sastav stanovništva Hrvatske, 1880–1991: po naseljima, author: Jakov Gelo, izdavač: Državni zavod za statistiku Republike Hrvatske, 1998., ISBN 953-6667-07-X, ISBN 978-953-6667-07-9;

== See also ==
- Osijek-Baranja county
- Baranja
