= Šećerana, Zrenjanin =

Šećerana (Serbian: Шећерана) is a neighbourhood of Zrenjanin, Serbia. The neighbourhood is both residential and industrial.

Local industries include a sugar refinery ("šećer" means sugar in Serbian, that is why neighbourhood is called "Šećerana"), heating plant company, electric transformer company, chemical factory, leather factory, medicine preparations plant, cosmetic preparations plant, cattle food factory, corn factory, abattoir, trucking company, seed factory, machine and container factory.

== See also ==
- Zrenjanin
