= Romani people in Croatia =

Ethnic group

Romi u Hrvatskoj
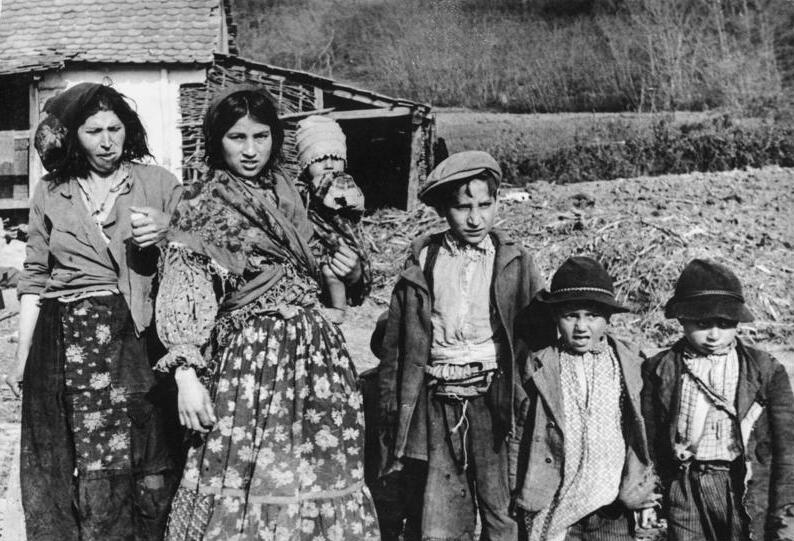
- Romani women wearing traditional dresses and their children near Zagreb in 1941

Total population
- 17,980 (2021 census)

Regions with significant populations
- Međimurje, Osijek-Baranja, Sisak-Moslavina County and Zagreb

Languages
- Majority: Croatian, Romanian (Boyash dialect); Minority: Balkan Romani; Others: Albanian

Religion
- Catholicism (49%); Sunni Islam (30%); Eastern Orthodoxy (14%)

Related ethnic groups
- Roma in Bosnia and Herzegovina, Roma in Serbia and Roma in Hungary

There have been Romani people in Croatia for more than 600 years and they are concentrated mostly in the northern regions of the country.

A considerable number of Romani refugees in Croatia are from the ethnic conflict in Bosnia and Herzegovina.

There are more than 120 Romani minority NGOs in Croatia. One of the most prominent is Croatian Roma Union and Alliance of Roma in the Republic of Croatia "Kali Sara".

== History ==
=== Origin ===
The Romani people originally came to Europe from Northern India, presumably from the northwestern Indian states of Rajasthan and Punjab.

The linguistic evidence has indisputably shown that roots of the Romani language lie in India: the language has grammatical characteristics of Indian languages and shares with them a big part of the basic lexicon, for example, body parts or daily routines.

More exactly, Romani shares the basic lexicon with Hindi and Punjabi. It shares many phonetic features with Marwari, while its grammar is closest to Bengali.

Genetic findings in 2012 suggest the Romani originated in northwestern India and migrated as a group. According to a genetic study in 2012, the ancestors of present scheduled tribes and scheduled caste populations of northern India, traditionally referred to collectively as the Ḍoma, are the likely ancestral populations of the modern European Roma.

In February 2016, during the International Roma Conference, the Indian Minister of External Affairs stated that the people of the Roma community were children of India. The conference ended with a recommendation to the Government of India to recognize the Roma community spread across 30 countries as a part of the Indian diaspora.

=== Migration to Croatia ===
Romani people were mentioned for the first time in the Republic of Ragusa in 1362 in some commercial records. Ten years later, Romani were recorded as being in Zagreb, where they were merchants, tailors and butchers.

Various Romani groups have lived in Croatia since the 14th century. In the second half of the 14th century, They settled in places like Dubrovnik, Zagreb, Pula, and Šibenik and worked as traders, craftsmen and entertainers.

In the Middle Ages Roma living in cities lived together with rest of the population. According to litteras promotorias, nomad Romani groups also had the authority to resolve independently all intragroup conflicts.

Maria Theresa and Joseph II, in regulations issued in 1761, 1767 and 1783, outlawed the Romani nomadic lifestyle, forced them to accept local clothing codes and languages, made regulations regarding personal and family names and limited their choice of professions.

Large groups of Roma arrived in Croatia in the 19th century from Romania after the abolition of Romani slavery there in 1855.

=== World War II ===
Between about 20,000 and about 30,000 Croatian Romani were executed by Ustasha police officers in Independent State of Croatia during World War II.

== Demographics ==
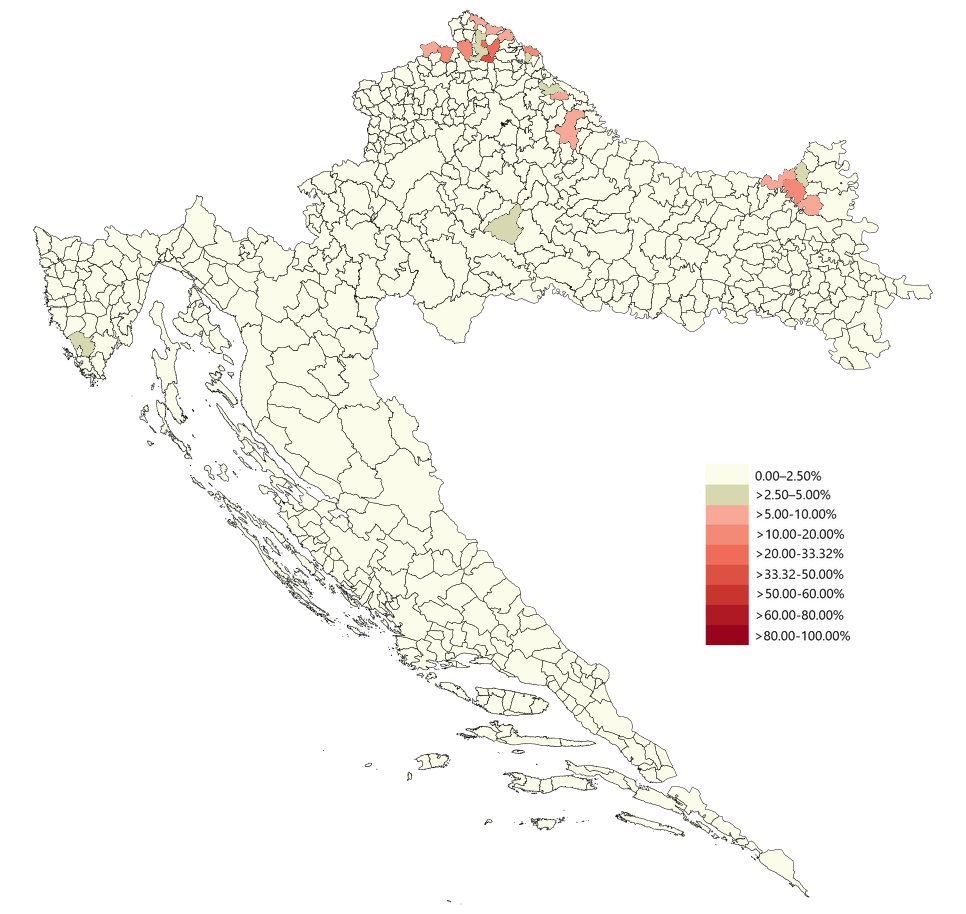
Romani by municipality, according to the 2021 Croatian census

The 2011 Croatian census found 16,675 Romani in Croatia or 0.4% of the population. In 2001, more than half of the Romani population was located in the Međimurje County and the City of Zagreb.

In the 2011 census, the largest religious groups among the Romani were Catholics (8,299 or 49.77% of them), Muslims (5,039 or 30.22% of them) and Eastern Orthodox (2,381 or 14.02% of them).

Surnames of Romani origin Oršoš and Oršuš are the third and fourth most common surnames in the Međimurje County.

== Culture ==
=== Language ===
The majority of the Romani people in Croatia speak the Boyash dialect of the Romanian language. It is estimated that around 80 percent of the Romani people in Croatia speak this variety of Romanian. There are also minor groups that speak the Romani language which originates from present-day India, and the Albanian language.

The Romani population in the counties of Međimurje, Osijek-Baranja and Brod-Posavina speaks the Boyash dialect of the Romanian language, while the Romani language is more present amongst the recent Romani immigrants who live in major urban centres.

The European Charter on Minority Languages is a very important document of the Council of Europe that promotes the use and protection of minority languages, and the Government of Croatia has for a long time placed a reservation on the part of the Romani language in order to exclude it from the protection of the Charter. The reason for that is that a majority of the Romani populace in Croatia speaks the Boyash dialect of the Romanian language and not the Romani language, and the reservation serves to protect the Boyash dialect of the Romanian language from the imposition of the Romani language.

The official representative of the Romani people in the Parliament of Croatia Veljko Kajtazi enforced and tried to impose the Romani language, which encountered resistance from the Boyash majority. An official in the Ministry of Education Nada Jakir commented on his efforts stating that Kajtazi wants the Romani people of Croatia to learn the Romani language, which is not their mother tongue, but a foreign one. After Jakir retired, Kajtazi pushed his efforts to implement the Romani language for the Romani minority in schools.

Moreover, the Romani-speaking minority doesn't consider the Boyash majority to be the real Romanis and considers them to be Romanians. On the other hand, the Boyash community scolds the Romanis that arrived from Kosovo for their lack of "Croathood".

=== Religion ===
In the 2011 census, the largest religious groups among the Romani were Catholics (8,299 or 49.77% of them), Muslims (5,039 or 30.22% of them) and Eastern Orthodox (2,381 or 14.02% of them).

== Romani in modern Croatia ==
In the Republic of Croatia, Romani have remained largely marginalized, so the government has a programme to provide them with systematic assistance in order to improve their living conditions and to include them in the social life. According to a survey conducted in 1998, 70% of surveyed families at the time did not have any permanently employed family members, 21% had one member, and 6% had two permanently employed members. Additional risks include poor housing conditions, inadequate clean water supplies and inadequate electricity infrastructure in Romani settlements, poor health care and low average level of education.

The Romani elect a special representative to the Croatian Parliament shared with members of eleven other national minorities. The first such member of parliament, Nazif Memedi, was elected in the 2007 parliamentary election. In 2010, Romani were added to the preamble of the Croatian Constitution and thereby recognized as one of the autochthonous national minorities. In 2012 the Faculty of Humanities and Social Sciences, University of Zagreb introduced for the first time courses titled Romani language I and Literature and culture of Roma.

=== Roma in Međimurje County ===
According to estimates and available data, at the beginning of 2009 in Međimurje County there lived about 5,500 Roma, 4.7% of the total population, which made them the largest national minority group in the county. According to the census in 2011, 2,887 people (2.44%) identified themselves as Romani. The difference between the census data and the actual Roma population can be explained by the fact that many Roma choose not to reveal their minority affiliation due to stigmatization. For example, in Donja Dubrava municipality, according to the 2001 census there wasn't a single Roma living there, even though at that time in the municipality there were little Romani settlements with about 70 people.

Altogether there are twelve settlements in Međimurje where the Romani minority live. A concentration of Roma in some settlements, and in certain peripheral streets of some settlements show territorial segregation of Roma within the county. In more than half of Međimurje municipalities, Roma are not present or are present in very small numbers.

== Notable people ==
- Duško Kostić, academic
- Severina Lajtman, actress
- Nazif Memedi, politician

== See also ==
- Oršuš and Others v. Croatia
- Roma Memorial Center Uštica
