= Šećerana, Beli Manastir =

Šećerana
- Village (Selo)
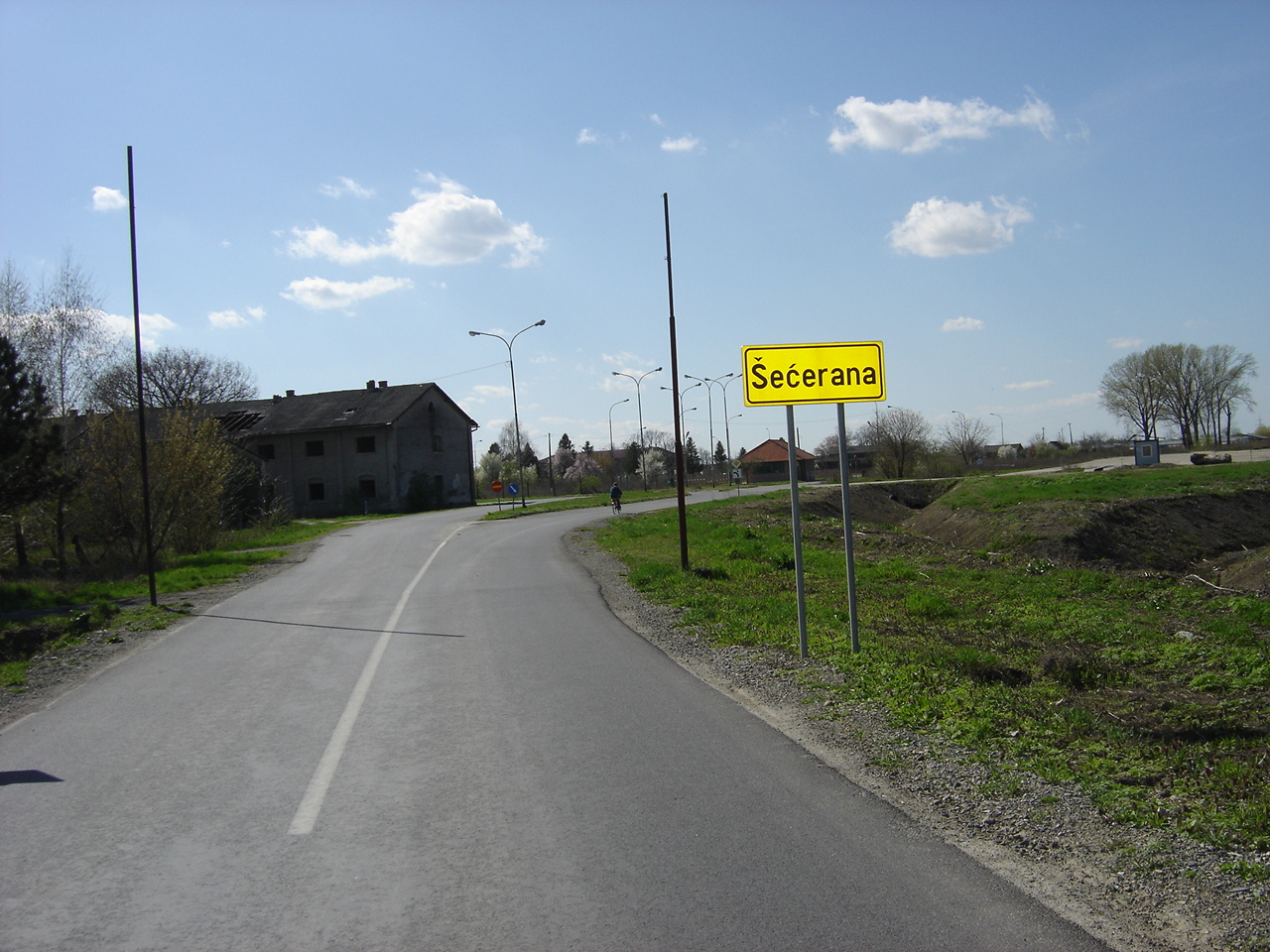
- Entrance to Šećerana

- Location within Osijek-Baranja County Location within Croatia Location within Europe
- Country: Croatia
- County: Osijek-Baranja
- Municipality: Beli Manastir

Area
  - Total: 2.8 km^{2} (1.1 sq mi)

Population (2021)
  - Total: 461
  - Density: 160/km^{2} (430/sq mi)

Šećerana (Hungarian: Cukorgyár, Serbian Cyrillic: Шећерана) is a settlement in the region of Baranja, Croatia. Administratively, it is located in the Beli Manastir municipality within the Osijek-Baranja County.
