= Torjanci =

- Village (Selo)
- Location within Osijek-Baranja County Location within Croatia Location within Europe
- Coordinates: 45°45′30″N 18°21′55″E
- Country: Croatia
- Region: Baranya
- County: Osijek-Baranja
- Municipality: Petlovac

Area
  - Total: 10.5 sq mi (27.1 km^{2})
- Elevation: 289 ft (88 m)

Population (2021)
  - Total: 244
  - Density: 23.3/sq mi (9.00/km^{2})
- Time zone: UTC+1 (CET)
  - Summer (DST): UTC+2 (CEST)
- Postal code: 31322 Baranjsko Petrovo Selo
- Area code: (+385) 31

Torjanci (Hungarian: Torjánc) is a settlement in the region of Baranja, Croatia. Administratively, it is located in the Petlovac municipality within the Osijek-Baranja County. Population is 267 people.

== Parts of settlement ==
Former parts of settlement are: Greda, Medrović-Lugarna, Pik and Verbak.

== Population ==
Population data graph 1857.-2011.
v

population	708	684	668	709	770	769	718	716	711	684	701	608	509	476	317	267
	1857	1869	1880	1890	1900	1910	1921	1931	1948	1953	1961	1971	1981	1991	2001	2011

Sources: Croatian Bureau of Statistics publications

== Ethnic composition, 1991. census ==
Torjanci
1991
total: 476
1. Croats 291 (61.1%)
2. Roma 135 (28.4%)
3. Hungarians 15 (3.15%)
4. Serbs 7 (1.47%)
5. Yugoslavs 4 (0.84%)
6. Slovenes 1 (0.21%)
7. ethnically undeclared 5 (1.05%)
8. regionally declared 1 (0.21%)
9. unknown 17 (3.57%)

== Austria-Hungary 1910. census ==
Torjanci
Population by ethnicity	Population by religion
total: 769: 1. Croats 563 (73.2%); 2. Germans 76 (9.88%); 3. Roma 72 (9.36%); 4. Hungarians 58 (7.54%)	total: 769: 1. Roman Catholics 743 (96.6%); 2. Calvinists 11 (1.43%); 3. eastern orthodox 7 (0.91%); 4. lutherans 6 (0.78%); 5. eastern Catholics 2 (0.26%)

== See also ==
- Osijek-Baranja county
- Baranja

== Literature ==
- Book: "Narodnosni i vjerski sastav stanovništva Hrvatske, 1880–1991: po naseljima, autor: Jakov Gelo, izdavač: Državni zavod za statistiku Republike Hrvatske, 1998., ISBN 953-6667-07-X, ISBN 978-953-6667-07-9;
