= Nazif Memedi =

Croatian politician

Nazif Memedi (born 6 January 1956) is a Croatian politician of Romani ethnicity. He was born in Pršovce, Tetovo Municipality, PR Macedonia, FPRY.

He had graduated from a secondary school for agricultural machine mechanics. In the Croatian parliamentary elections of 2007 he was elected to the Croatian Sabor. He is the first person of Roma ethnicity to become a member of the parliament.
