= Novo Nevesinje =

Novo Nevesinje Ново Невесиње
- Village (Selo)
- Location within Osijek-Baranja County Location within Croatia Location within Europe
- Coordinates: 45°44′05″N 18°24′58″E
- Country: Croatia
- Region: Baranya
- County: Osijek-Baranja
- Municipality: Petlovac

Area
  - Total: 3.2 sq mi (8.2 km^{2})
- Elevation: 282 ft (86 m)

Population (2021)
  - Total: 41
  - Density: 13/sq mi (5.0/km^{2})
- Demonym(s): Nevesinjanin (♂) Nevesinjanka (♀) (per grammatical gender)
- Time zone: UTC+1 (CET)
  - Summer (DST): UTC+2 (CEST)
- Postal code: 31322 Baranjsko Petrovo Selo
- Area code: (+385) 31

Novo Nevesinje (Serbian: Ново Невесиње, Hungarian: Botond) is a settlement in the region of Baranja, Croatia. Administratively, it is located in the Petlovac municipality within the Osijek-Baranja County. Population is 63 people.

== History ==
Novo Nevesinje has existed as part of the settlement from 1880. Its name was Piskora from 1880–1931. It was formally established as an independent settlement in 1991, when it was separated from the territory of Baranjsko Petrovo Selo.

== Population ==
Population data graph 1857.-2011.
v

population					60	64			189	184	198	179	145	115	73	63
	1857	1869	1880	1890	1900	1910	1921	1931	1948	1953	1961	1971	1981	1991	2001	2011

Sources: Croatian Bureau of Statistics publications

== Ethnic composition, 1991. census ==
Novo Nevesinje
1991
total: 115
1. Serbs 104 (90.4%)
2. Hungarians 8 (6.95%)
3. ethnic Muslims 1 (0.86%)
4. unknown 2 (1.73%)

== Literature ==
- Book: "Narodnosni i vjerski sastav stanovništva Hrvatske, 1880–1991: po naseljima, author: Jakov Gelo, izdavač: Državni zavod za statistiku Republike Hrvatske, 1998., ISBN 953-6667-07-X, ISBN 978-953-6667-07-9;

== See also ==
- Osijek-Baranja county
- Baranja
