= Drávaszabolcs =

- Village
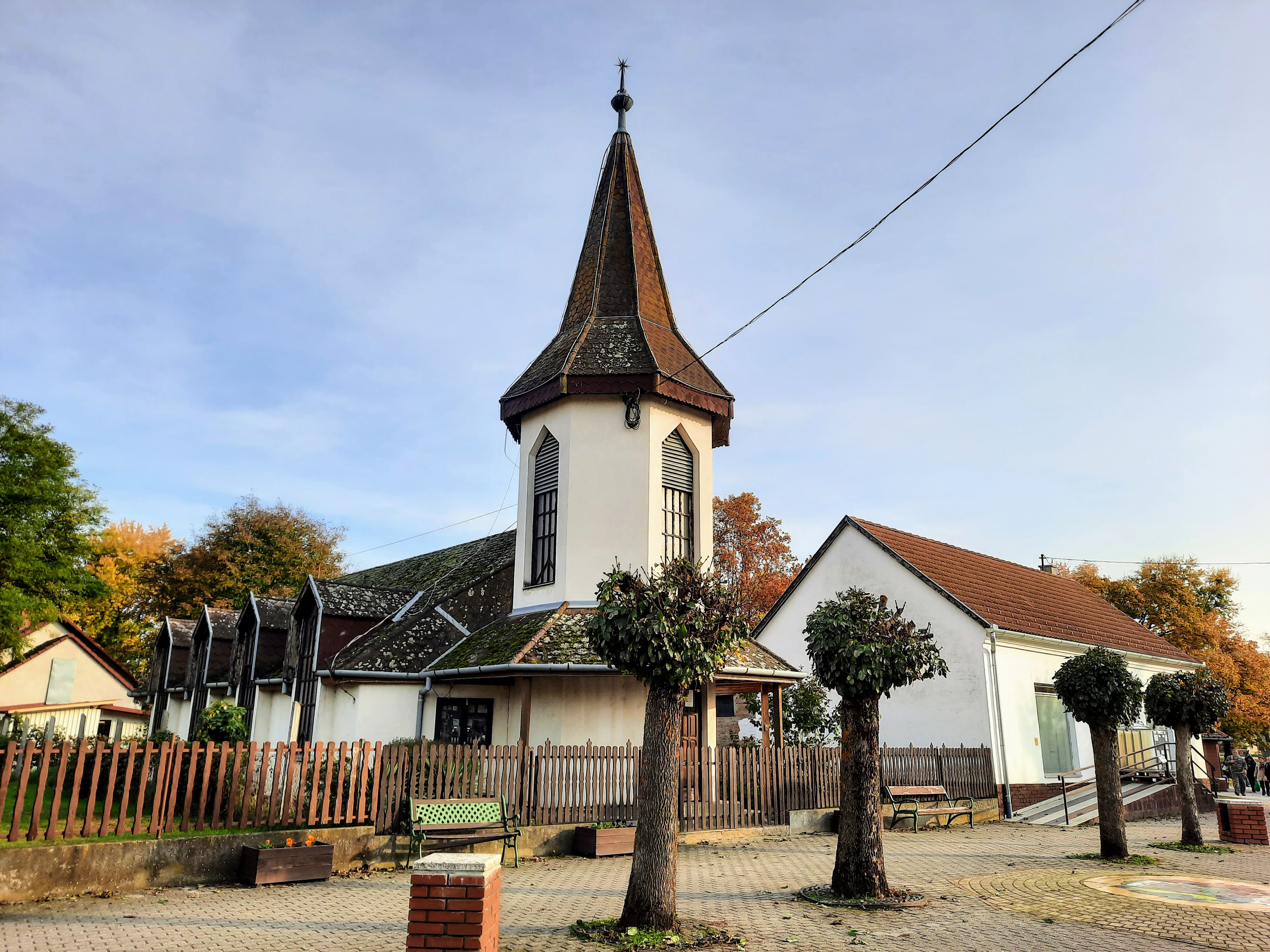
- Drávaszabolcs
- Interactive map of Drávaszabolcs
- Coordinates: 45°48′N 18°13′E
- Country: Hungary
- County: Baranya
- Time zone: UTC+1 (CET)
  - Summer (DST): UTC+2 (CEST)

Drávaszabolcs is a village in Baranya county, Hungary.
