= Šumarina =

- Village (Selo)
- Location within Osijek-Baranja County Location within Croatia Location within Europe
- Country: Croatia
- County: Osijek-Baranja
- Municipality: Beli Manastir

Area
  - Total: 5.2 km^{2} (2.0 sq mi)

Population (2021)
  - Total: 421
  - Density: 81/km^{2} (210/sq mi)

Šumarina (Hungarian: Benge, Serbian Cyrillic: Шумарина) is a settlement in the region of Baranja, Croatia. Administratively, it is located in the Beli Manastir municipality within the Osijek-Baranja County.
