= Beremend =

Beremend Behrend
- Large village
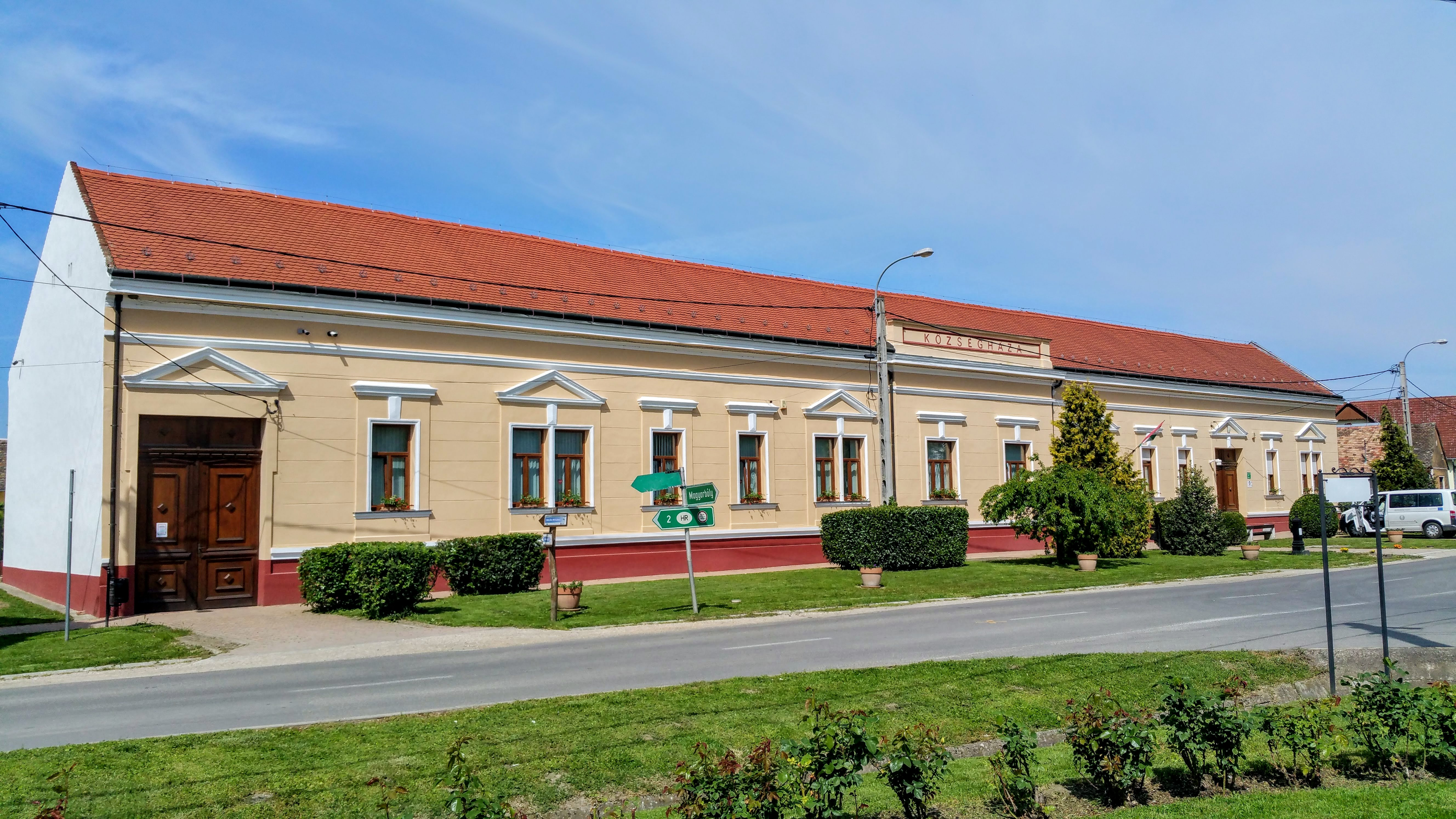
- Village hall

- Flag Coat of arms
- Interactive map of Beremend
- Location of Beremend
- Coordinates: 45.78384°N 18.43233°E
- Country: Hungary
- County: Baranya
- District: Siklós

Area
  - Total: 48.26 km^{2} (18.63 sq mi)

Population (2014)
  - Total: 2,467
  - Density: 58.18/km^{2} (150.7/sq mi)
- Time zone: UTC+1 (CET)
  - Summer (DST): UTC+2 (CEST)
- Postal code: 7827
- Area code: (+36) 72

Beremend (German: Behrend; Serbian: Бреме, Breme; Croatian: Breme, Bremen, Brime) is a village in Baranya County, Hungary on the Croatian border, it constitutes the southernmost point of the country.

== History ==
In the 17th and 18th century, the village was settled by Germans, Serbs and Hungarians after a victory over the Ottoman Empire.

Until the end of World War II, the town's inhabitants were Danube Swabians, also referred to locally as Stifolder, because their ancestors arrived in the 17th and 18th centuries from the German district of Fulda. Most of the former German settlers were expelled to Allied-occupied Germany and Allied-occupied Austria in 1945–1948, consequent to the Potsdam Agreement.

Few Germans remain today. The majority of the modern population are the descendants of Hungarians from the Czechoslovak–Hungarian population exchange. They occupied the houses of the former Danube Swabian inhabitants.

== Weather ==
In Beremend, it is partly cloudy year round. Over the course of the year, the temperature typically varies from 28 °F to 83 °F and is rarely below 16 °F or above 92 °F.

== EU Refugee Crisis ==
Thousands of refugees arrived from Croatia enter Hungary as Hungarian army members take security measures at Hungarian-Croatian border on September 19, 2015. Thousands drowned while trying the cross the Mediterranean from Libya and Turkey to Europe, prompting an EU-wide mission to intercept people attempting to make the crossing. However, Hungary sent armored vehicles to its border with Croatia, as tensions mounted between the neighboring countries over the migrant crisis.

== Demographics ==
As of 2022, the town was 93.8% Hungarian, 2.4% German, 2.1% Roma, 1.2% Croatian, and 0.8% of non-European origin. The population was 39.8% Roman Catholic, and 8.3% Reformed, and 14.6% nondenominational.

== Sport ==
- Beremendi Építők SK, association football club
