= Beli Manastir =

- Town
- Grad Beli Manastir; Town of Beli Manastir
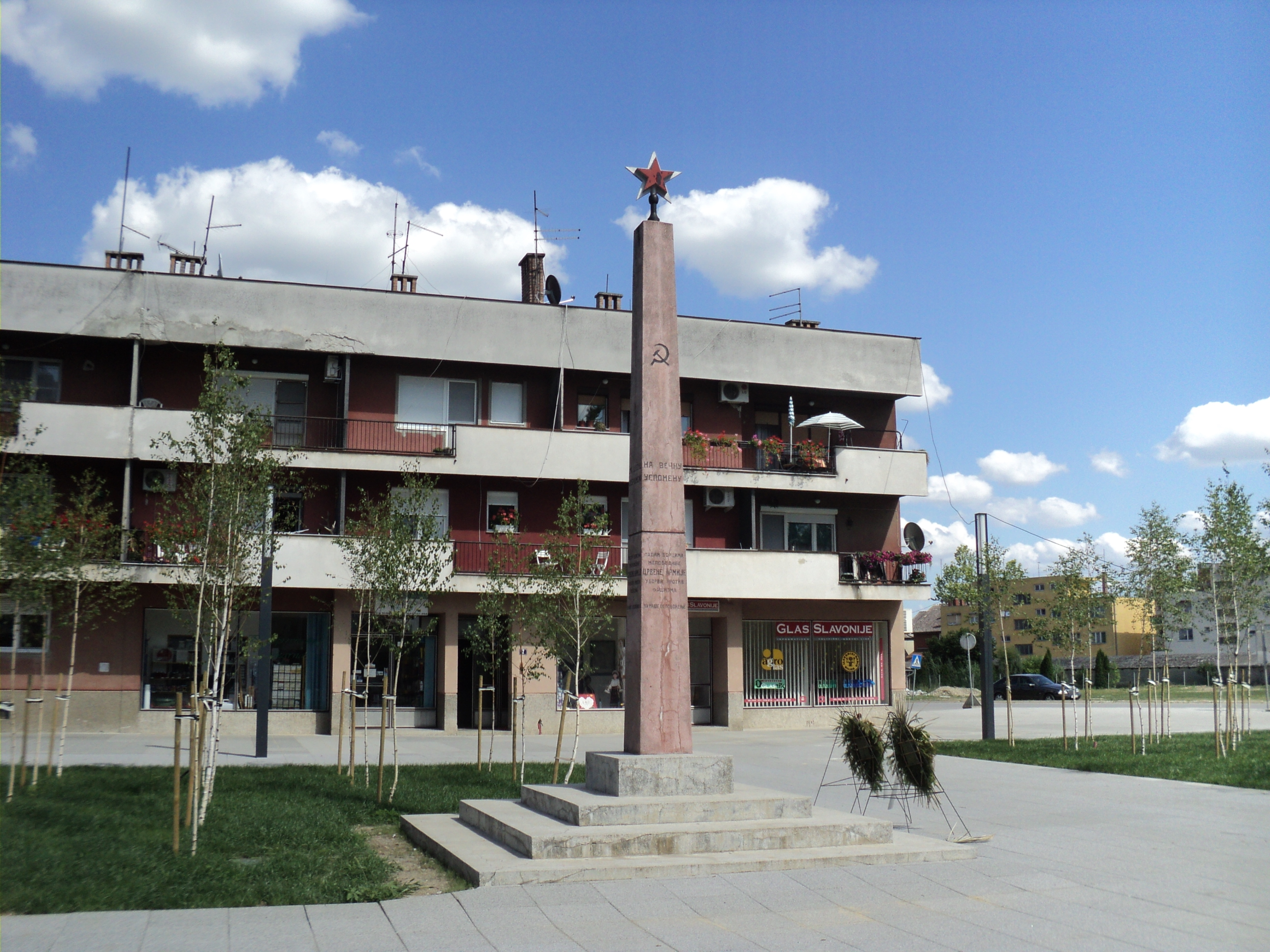
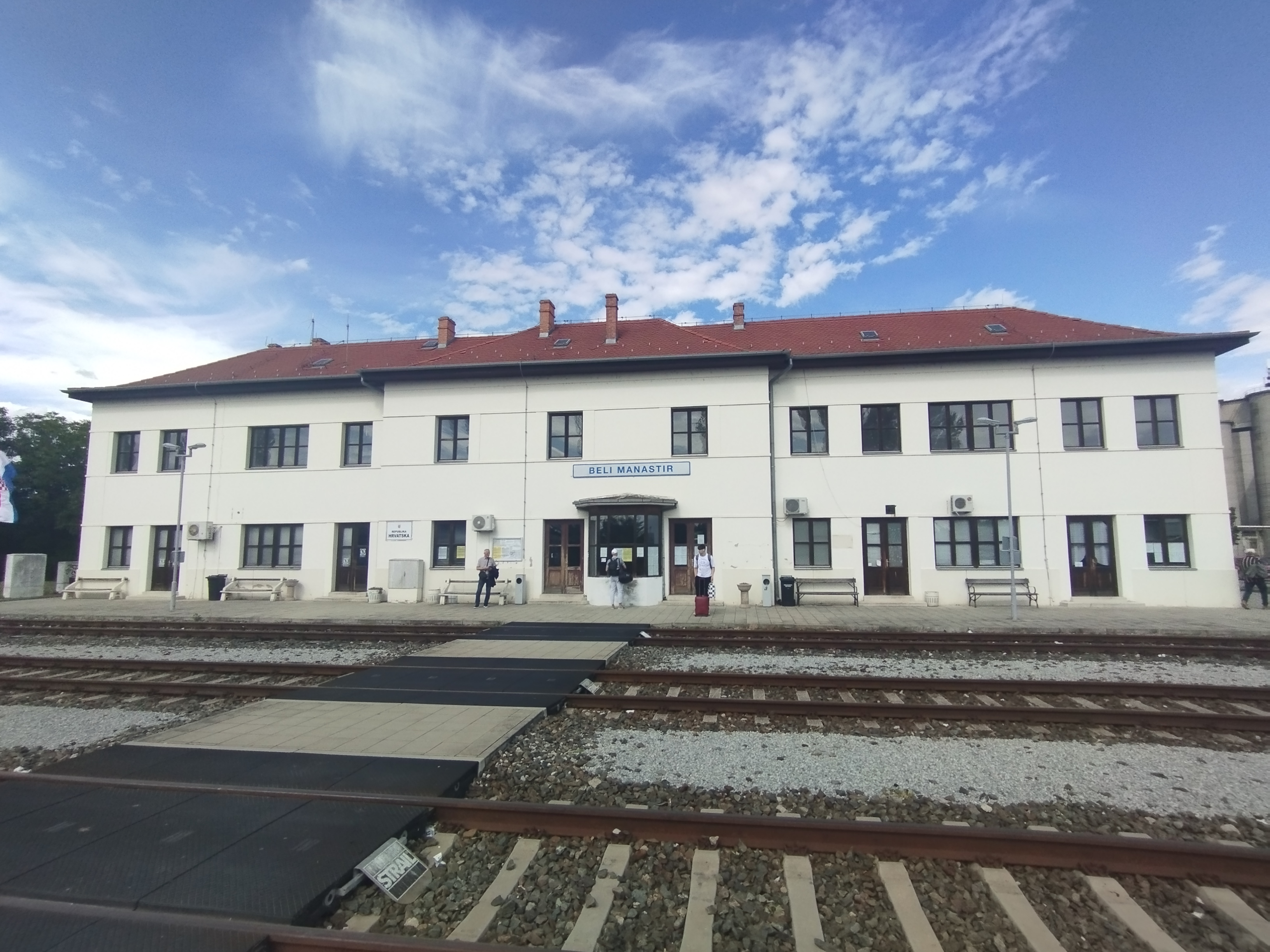
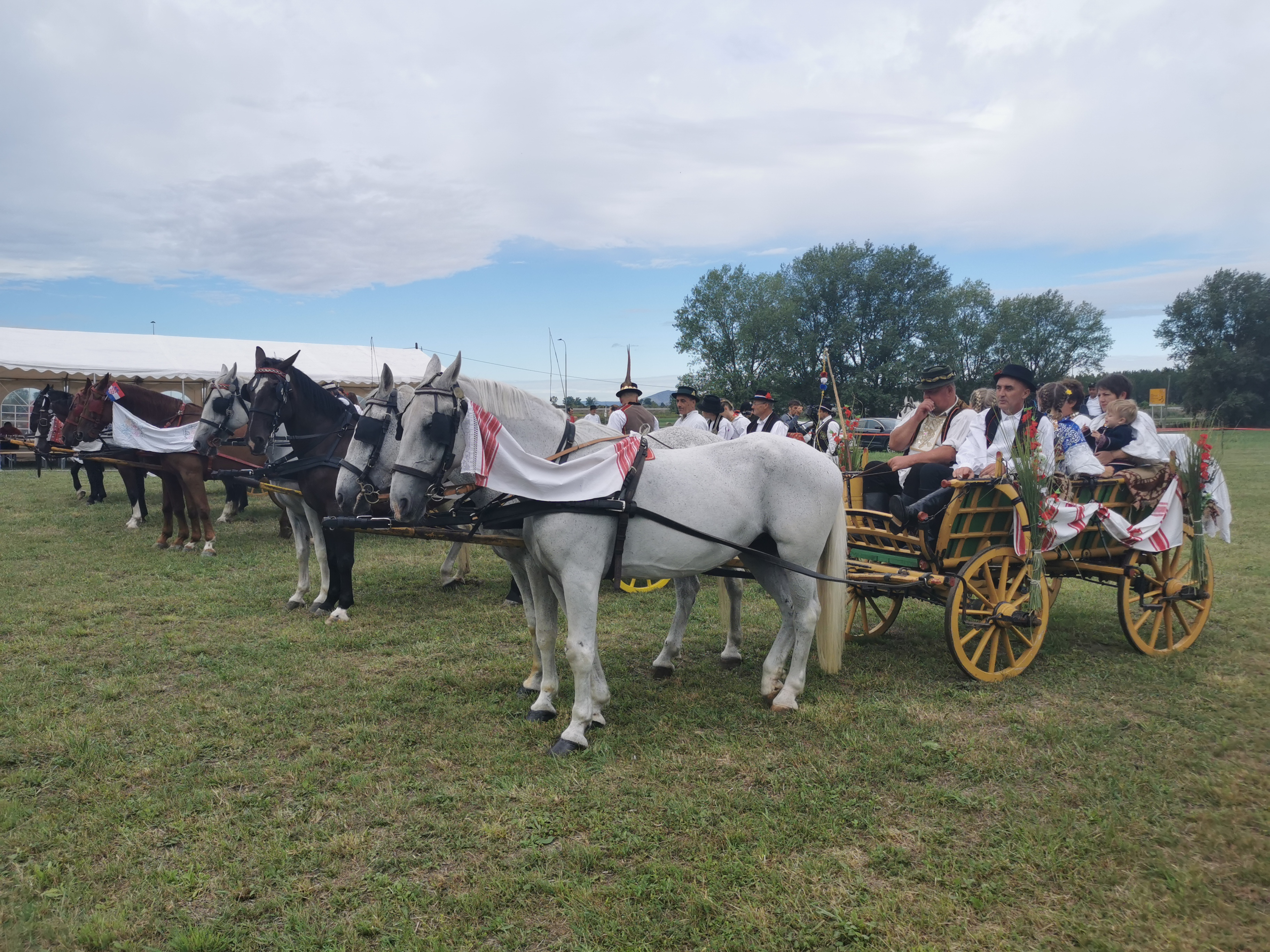
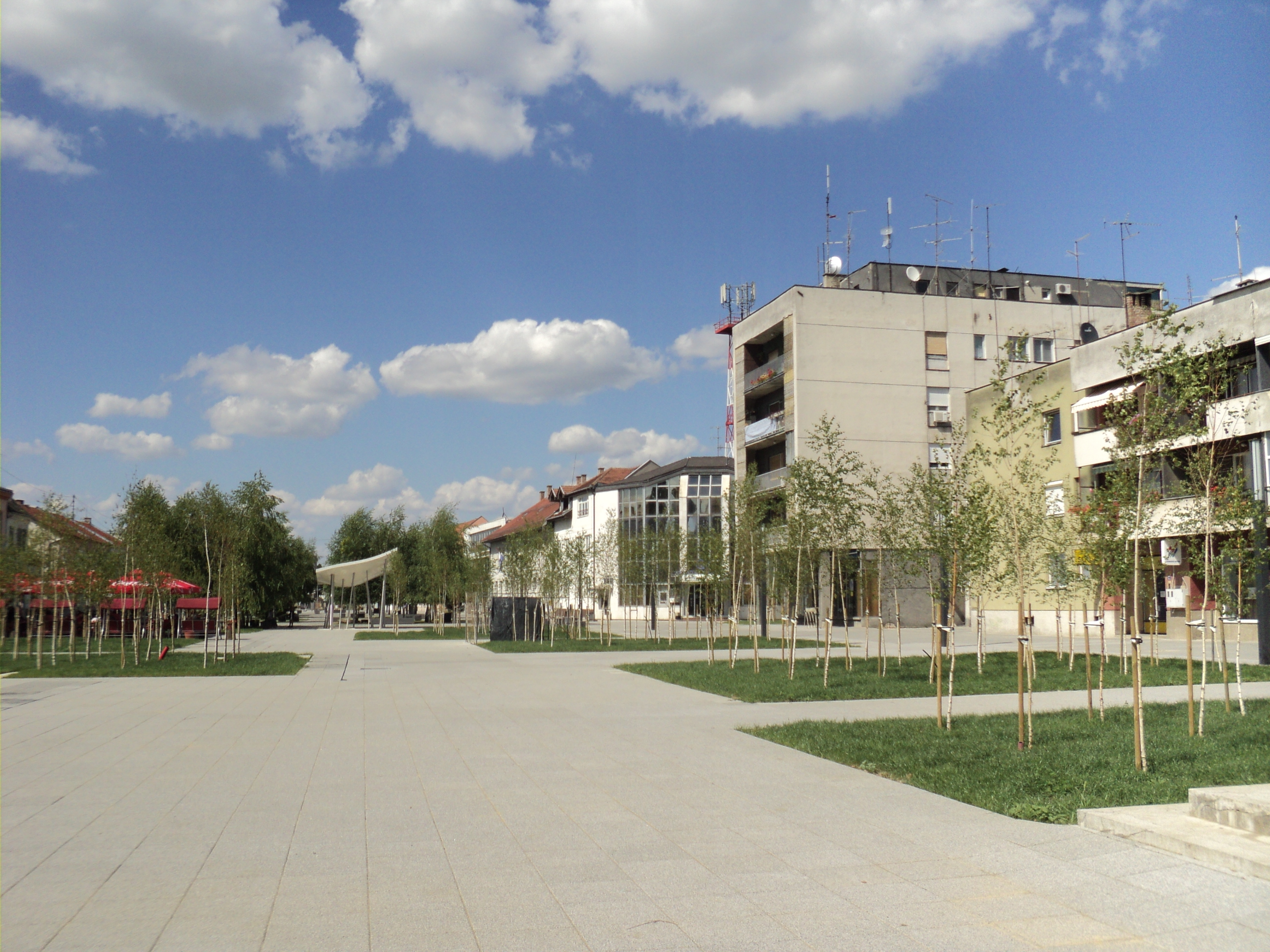
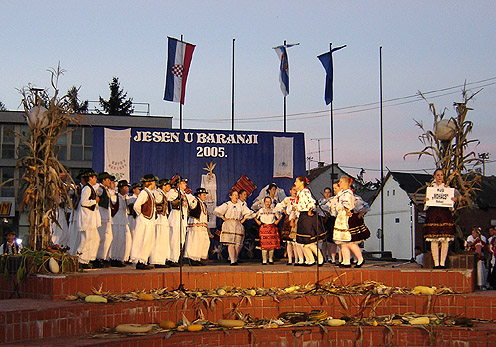
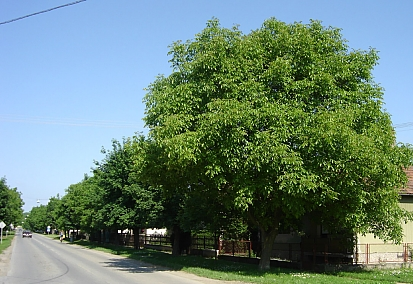
- Beli Manastir

- Coat of arms

- Location of Beli Manastir in Croatia Beli Manastir (Croatia) Beli Manastir (Europe)
- Coordinates: 45°46′N 18°36′E
- Country: Croatia
- Region: Baranja (Podunavlje)
- County: Osijek-Baranja County

Government
  - Mayor: Igor Pavelić (HDZ)
  - City Council: 15 members: • HDZ, HSU (10); • SDP (4); • SDSS (1)

Area
  - Town: 62.4 km^{2} (24.1 sq mi)
  - Urban: 36.1 km^{2} (13.9 sq mi)
- Elevation: 100 m (330 ft)

Population (2021)
  - Town: 7,973
  - Density: 128/km^{2} (331/sq mi)
  - Urban: 6,327
  - Urban density: 175/km^{2} (454/sq mi)
- Demonym(s): Belomanastirac (♂) Belomanastirka (♀) (per grammatical gender)
- Time zone: UTC+1 (CET)
  - Summer (DST): UTC+2 (CEST)
- Postal code: 31300 Beli Manastir
- Area code: (+385) 31
- Website: www.beli-manastir.hr

Beli Manastir (Hungarian: Pélmonostor) is a town in eastern Croatia. It is the principal town of the Croatian part of Baranja, located in the Osijek-Baranja County.

== Name ==
The name means "white monastery" in Serbo-Croatian. Originally called Monoštor, the current name was adopted in 1923. It is also known as Pélmonostor in Hungarian, and Manoster in German. The name Beli Manastir was first mentioned in 1227, when Moys de Daro, Hungarian Palatine, built a monastery on his estate in Pelu.

Other names formerly used for the town were: Pél, Bell, and Monostor. All names are connected with monasteries that existed in history at this location. The first monastery was built in the 9th century during the rule of Slavic duke Kocelj but was later razed, and all that remained of it was pil (obelisk in English), hence the later Hungarian name Pél, which was a version of the Slavic word.

== History ==
In the 9th century, this area was part of the Slavic Principality of Lower Pannonia and a Slavic monastery was situated here. The monastery was founded during the visit of Cyril and Methodius, who spread Christianity among Slavs. After Methodius died, his students were expelled and the monastery was razed.

After the arrival of the Hungarians in the 10th century, this area was included in the newly founded Hungarian state and the settlement was built at this locality. The town was first mentioned in 1212 under name Pél. During Hungarian administration, another monastery was built here (in the 13th century), but it was destroyed by the Mongols in 1241. It was later rebuilt, but was again destroyed during the Ottoman conquest in the 16th century. Between 11th and 16th centuries, the area administratively belonged to the Baranya county.

In the 16th–17th century, the area was part of the Ottoman Empire and administratively belonged to the Sanjak of Mohaç. Since the end of the 17th century, the area was part of the Habsburg monarchy and administratively belonged to the Baranya county, which was part of the Habsburg Kingdom of Hungary.

Until the end of World War II, the inhabitants were Danube Swabians, also called locally as Stifolder, because their ancestors arrived around 1720 from Fulda (district). Most of the former German settlers were expelled to Allied-occupied Germany and Allied-occupied Austria in 1945-1948, consequent to the Potsdam Agreement.

Since 1918, the town was part of the Kingdom of Serbs, Croats and Slovenes (later renamed to Yugoslavia). From 1918 to 1922, it was part of the Novi Sad county, from 1922 to 1929 part of the Bačka Oblast, and from 1929 to 1941 part of the Danube Banovina. From 1941 to 1944, it returned to Hungary and was administratively included into Baranya county. It was re-occupied by Yugoslav control in 1944 and was administratively part of Vojvodina until 1945, when it was transferred to the People's Republic of Croatia.

During the Croatian War of Independence (1991–1995), Beli Manastir was occupied by Serbian paramilitaries and incorporated into the Republic of Serbian Krajina. It was returned to Croatian control after the war, following the short period of UN administration (1996–1998). Beli Manastir is an underdeveloped municipality which is statistically classified as the First Category Area of Special State Concern by the Government of Croatia.

== Town of Beli Manastir ==
=== Geography ===
The Town of Beli Manastir is composed of 4 settlements:

- Beli Manastir, population 8,049
- Branjin Vrh, population 993
- Šećerana, population 540
- Šumarina, population 486

=== Climate ===
Since records began in 2004, the highest temperature recorded at the local weather station was 40.2 °C (104.4 °F), on 6 August 2012. The coldest temperature was −25.4 °C (−13.7 °F), on 9 February 2012.

=== Demographics ===
==== 1910 ====
According to the 1910 census, the town had 2,447 inhabitants, of which:

- Germans – 1,496 (61.1%)
- Serbs – 478 (19.5%)
- Hungarians – 443 (18.1%)
- Croats – 6 (0.24%)
- others – 24 (0.98%)

==== 1929 ====
In 1929 the population was made of:

- Hungarians – 33.8%
- Germans – 32.6%
- Croats – 18.8%
- Serbs – 12%

==== 1981 ====
53,409 total

- Croats – 19,136 (35.83%)
- Serbs – 12,857 (24.07%)
- Hungarians – 9,920 (18.57%)
- Yugoslavs – 8,850 (16.57%)
- Slovenes – 353 (0.66%)
- Montenegrins – 276 (0.52%)
- Romani – 262 (0.49%)
- Muslims – 82 (0.15%)
- Albanians – 56 (0.11%)
- Macedonians – 45 (0.08%)

==== 2001 ====
The town had a population of 8,671, while total municipality population was 10,986. Ethnic composition of Beli Manastir municipality by 2001 census was:

- Croats = 6,085 (55.39%)
- Serbs = 2,920 (26.58%)
- Hungarians = 933 (8.49%)
- Romani = 153 (1.39%)
- Germans = 122 (1.11%)

=== Buildings and structures ===
In 1966, a broadcasting mast standing 202 metres high was erected.

=== Economy ===
Beli Manastir is home to the STARCO Beli steel wheel factory.

== Politics ==
=== Minority councils ===
Directly elected minority councils and representatives are tasked with consulting tasks for the local or regional authorities in which they are advocating for minority rights and interests, integration into public life and participation in the management of local affairs. At the 2023 Croatian national minorities councils and representatives elections Hungarians, Roma and Serbs of Croatia each fulfilled legal requirements to elect 15 members minority councils of the Town of Beli Manastir.

== Beli Manastir (settlement) ==
=== Parts of settlement (hamlets) ===
Beli Manastir, Beli Manastir-Planina, Haljevo and Palača. Till 1991. part of settlement was also Sudaraž which is now independent settlement.

=== Population ===
Population data graph 1857–2011
v

population	1393	1532	1475	1584	1612	2306	2892	3093	3191	3520	4804	7206	9118	10146	8671	8049
	1857	1869	1880	1890	1900	1910	1921	1931	1948	1953	1961	1971	1981	1991	2001	2011

Sources: Croatian Bureau of Statistics publications

=== Ethnic composition, 1991. census ===
Beli Manastir
1991
total: 10,146
1. Serbs 3,770 (37.1%)
2. Croats 3,262 (32.1%)
3. Yugoslavs 1,303 (12.8%)
4. Hungarians 865 (8.52%)
5. Montenegrins 146 (1.43%)
6. Germans 86 (0.84%)
7. Slovenes 78 (0.76%)
8. Muslims by nat. 58 (0.57%)
9. Albanians 55 (0.54%)
10. Slovaks 18 (0.17%)
11. Roma 11 (0.10%)
12. Macedonians 10 (0.09%)
13. Ukrainians 9 (0.08%)
14. Romanians 8 (0.07%)
15. Czechs 5 (0.04%)
16. Russians 5 (0.04%)
17. Poles 4 (0.03%)
18. Bulgarians 2 (0.01%)
19. Ruthenians 2 (0.01%)
20. Greeks 1 (0.00%)
21. Italians 1 (0.00%)
22. others 11 (0.10%)
23. ethnically undecl. 369 (3.63%)
24. regionally declared 11 (0.10%)
25. unknown 56 (0.55%)

== Austria-Hungary 1910. census ==
Beli Manastir
Population by ethnicity	Population by religion
total: 2,447: 1. Germans 1,496 (61.1%); 2. Serbs 478 (19.5%); 3. Hungarians 443 (18.1%); 4. Croats 6 (0.24%); 5. others 24 (0.98%)	total: 2,447: 1. Roman Catholics 1,871 (76.5%); 2. Eastern Orthodox 478 (19.5%); 3. Lutherans 40 (1.63%); 4. Jewish 34 (1.38%); 5. Calvinists 21 (0.85%); 6. Eastern Catholics 2 (0.08%); 7. Unitarians 1 (0.04%)

- In 1910. census together with settlement Sudaraž.

== Notable people ==
- Milan Kašanin
- Duško Kostić
- Aleksandra Prijović

== See also ==
- Osijek-Baranja County
- Baranya
- Baranya County (former)

== Literature ==
- Book: "Narodnosni i vjerski sastav stanovništva Hrvatske, 1880–1991: po naseljima, autor: Jakov Gelo, izdavač: Državni zavod za statistiku Republike Hrvatske, 1998., ISBN 953-6667-07-X, ISBN 978-953-6667-07-9;
