= Baranjsko Petrovo Selo =

- Village (Selo)
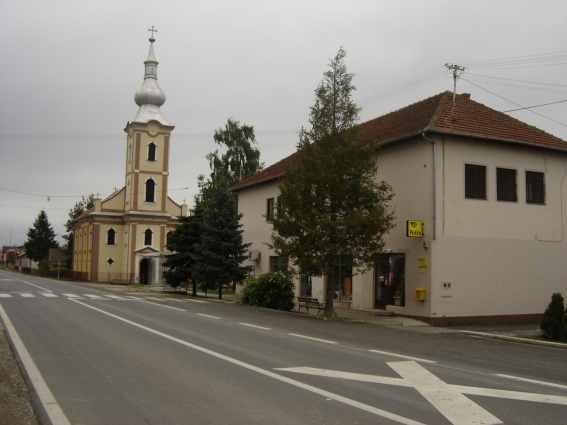
- Baranjsko Petrovo Selo, Roman Catholic church "St. Lawrence" in main street

- Location within Croatia
- Coordinates: 45°45′18″N 18°28′10″E
- Country: Croatia
- Region: Baranya (Podunavlje)
- County: Osijek-Baranja
- Municipality: Petlovac

Area
  - Total: 9.0 sq mi (23.2 km^{2})
- Elevation: 289 ft (88 m)

Population (2021)
  - Total: 434
  - Density: 48.5/sq mi (18.7/km^{2})
- Time zone: UTC+1 (CET)
  - Summer (DST): UTC+2 (CEST)
- Postal code: 31322 Baranjsko Petrovo Selo
- Area code: (+385) 31

Baranjsko Petrovo Selo (Hungarian: Petárda) is a settlement in the region of Baranja, Croatia. Administratively, it is located in the Petlovac municipality within the Osijek-Baranja County. Population is 525 people.

== History ==
It was first mentioned in 1349 and its older name was Petarda. According to Ottoman defters (tax records), the village was also inhabited during Ottoman administration.

== Parts of settlement (hamlets) ==
Bakanga, Baranjsko Petrovo Selo, Repnjak and Žido-Pusta. Former parts are: Greisinger-Pusta, Paleža-Salaš, Vrbak-Pusta and Žido-Lugarna. Till 1991. part of settlement was also Novo Nevesinje which is now independent settlement.

== Population ==
Population data graph 1857.-2011.
v

population	980	1072	1027	1059	1006	943	960	1105	1059	955	911	878	788	779	570	525
	1857	1869	1880	1890	1900	1910	1921	1931	1948	1953	1961	1971	1981	1991	2001	2011

Sources: Croatian Bureau of Statistics publications

== Ethnic composition, 1991. census ==
Baranjsko Petrovo Selo
1991
total: 779
1. Croats 609 (78.2%)
2. Hungarians 72 (9.24%)
3. Serbs 29 (3.72%)
4. Yugoslavs 11 (1.41%)
5. Romanians 6 (0.77%)
6. Roma 5 (0.64%)
7. Albanians 4 (0.51%)
8. Germans 4 (0.51%)
9. Ruthenians 3 (0.38%)
10. Slovaks 3 (0.38%)
11. Italians 1 (0.12%)
12. Macedonians 1 (0.12%)
13. ethnically undeclared 14 (1.79%)
14. unknown 17 (2.18%)

== Austria-Hungary 1910. census ==
Baranjsko Petrovo Selo
Population by ethnicity	Population by religion
total: 1,007: 1. Croats 790 (78.5%); 2. Hungarians 108 (10.7%); 3. Germans 62 (6.15%); 4. Serbs 21 (2.08%); 5. others 26 (2.58%)	total: 1,007: 1. Roman Catholics 963 (95.6%); 2. eastern orthodox 23 (2.28%); 3. calvinists 8 (0.79%); 4. jewish 6 (0.59%); 5. others 7 (0.69%)

- In 1910. census together with settlement Novo Nevesinje.

== Literature ==
- Book: "Narodnosni i vjerski sastav stanovništva Hrvatske, 1880–1991: po naseljima, author: Jakov Gelo, izdavač: Državni zavod za statistiku Republike Hrvatske, 1998., ISBN 953-6667-07-X, ISBN 978-953-6667-07-9;

== See also ==
- Osijek-Baranja County
- Baranja
