= D34 road (Croatia) =

Road in Croatia

D34 state road

Route information
- Length: 79 km (49 mi)

Major junctions
- From: D2 in Slatina; D69 in Slatina
- D53 in Donji Miholjac; D517 in Valpovo
- To: D2 near Osijek

Location
- Country: Croatia
- Counties: Virovitica-Podravina, Osijek-Baranja
- Major cities: Slatina, Donji Miholjac, Belišće, Valpovo, Osijek

Highway system
- Highways in Croatia

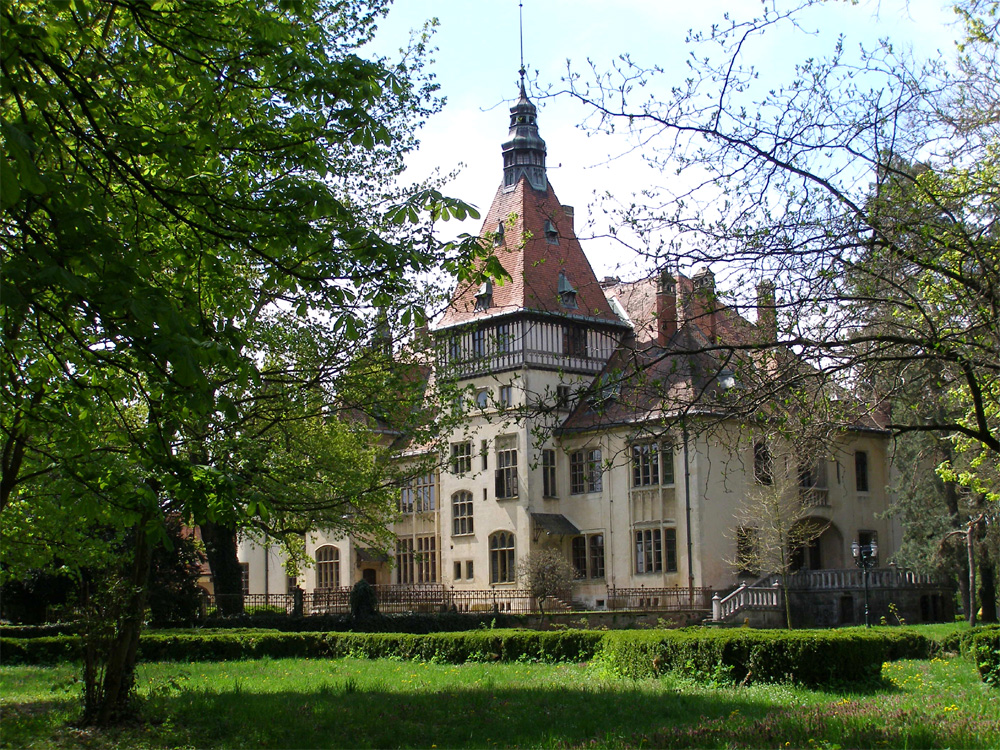
Donji Miholjac, on the D34 road route

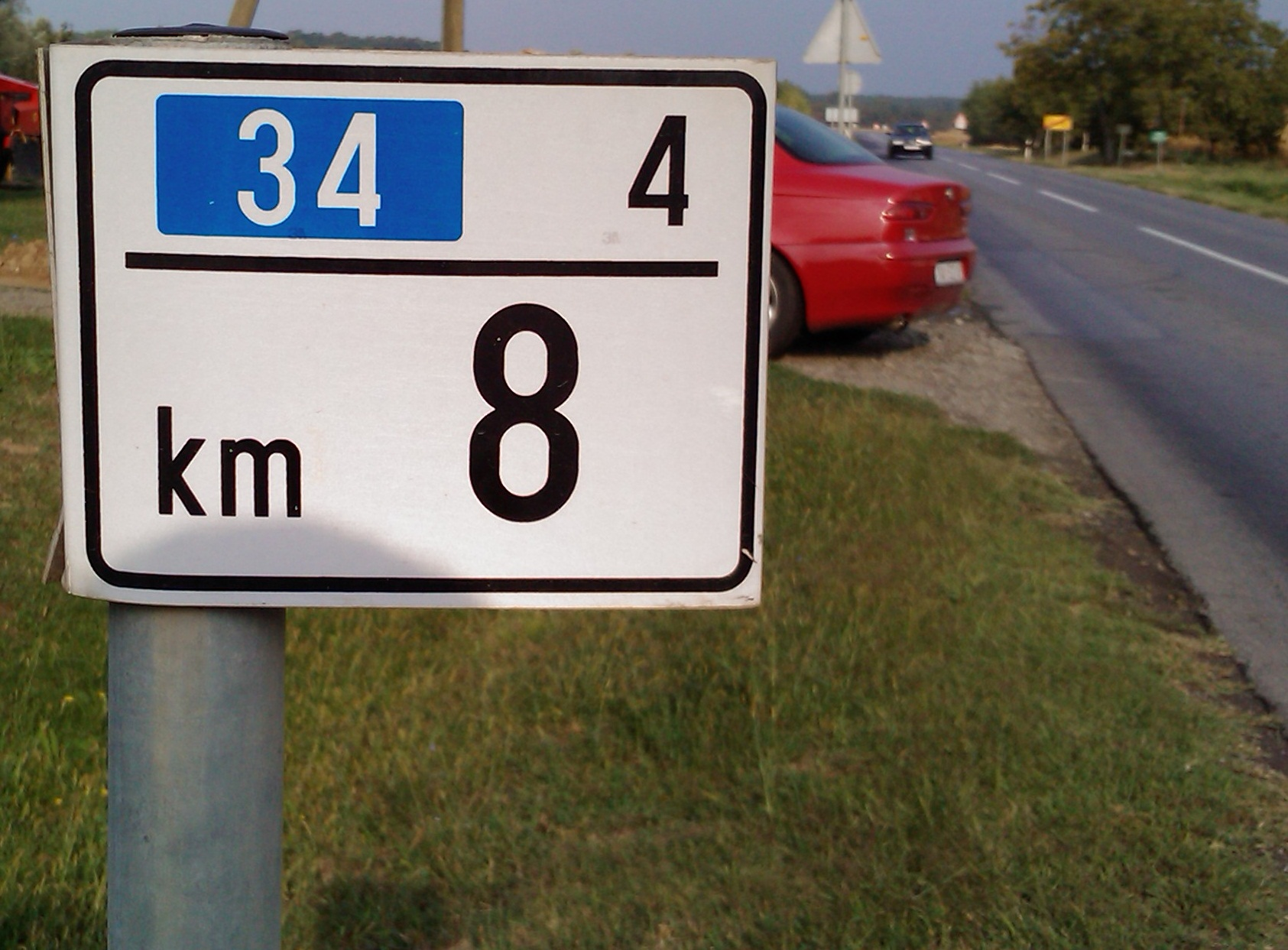
A D34 road mile marker

D34 is a state road in Slavonia region of Croatia connecting the cities of Slatina, Donji Miholjac, Valpovo and Osijek. The road is 79 km (49 mi) long.

This and all other state roads in Croatia are managed and maintained by Hrvatske ceste, state owned company.

== Traffic volume ==
Traffic is regularly counted and reported by Hrvatske ceste, operator of the road.

D34 traffic volume
Road	Counting site	AADT	ASDT	Notes
D34	2411 Podravska Moslavina	1,986	2,022	Between the Ž4030 and Ž4031 junctions.
D34	2402 Donji Miholjac - east	3,463	3,729	Adjacent to the D53 junction.
D34	2405 Šag	5,237	4,949	Adjacent to the Ž4051 junction.

== Road junctions and populated areas ==
D34 junctions/populated areas
Type	Slip roads/Notes
	Slatina; D2 to Našice, Osijek and Vukovar (to the east) and to Virovitica and Varaždin (to the west). D69 to Voćin and Kamenska; The western terminus of the road.
	Medinci
	Ž4026 to Nova Šarovka.
	Novi Senkovac
	Šaševo
	Čađavica; Ž4038 to Mikleuš and Četekovac. Ž4024 to Noskovci, Sopje, Vaška and Suhopolje (D2).
	Čađavački Lug
	Gezinci
	Podravska Moslavina; Ž4030 to Moslavački Krčenik, Zdenci, Orahovica, Kutjevo and Pleternica (D38).
	Viljevo; Ž4031 to Šljivoševci and Koška (D2).
	Donji Miholjac; Ž4032 to Ivanovo. D53 to Donji Miholjac border crossing to Hungary. The D34 and D53 roads are concurrent to the south of the junction. Ž4295 within the town.
	D53 to Našice (D2) and Slavonski Brod. The D34 and D53 roads are concurrent to the north of the junction.
	Sveti Đurađ
	Podgajci Podravski
	Črnkovci; Ž4047 to Čamagajevci and Miholjački Poreč (D53). Ž4049 to Marijanci and Šljivoševci.
	Veliškovci
	Valpovo; D517 to Belišće and Beli Manastir (D7). Ž4051 within the city. Ž4052 to Koška (D2). Ž4059 to Bocanjevci.
	Šag
	Petrijevci; Ž4061 to Ladimirevci.
	Ž4068 to Josipovac, Višnjevac and Osijek.
	D2 to Našice and Varaždin (to the west) and to the A5 motorway Osijek interchange, Osijek and Vukovar (to the east). The interchange marks the western extent of Osijek bypass. The eastern terminus of the road.
