= Kabalna =

- Village
- Interactive map of Kabalna
- Location within Croatia
- Coordinates: 45°41′N 18°08′E
- Country: Croatia
- County: Osijek-Baranja
- Elevation: 93 m (305 ft)

Population (2011)
  - Total: 0
- Time zone: UTC+1 (CET)
  - Summer (DST): UTC+2 (CEST)

Kabalna is an uninhabited settlement in Croatia. It was located at the bridge over the Karašica. It belonged to Golinci, administratively.

== History ==
Kabalna formed after WWII by refugees from Banija and functioned until 1969, after which it was dispersed. Then PIK Donji Miholjac purchased the land, forcing the villagers to move to Gložđe and Donji Miholjac, while the children left for larger cities like Zagreb, Belgrade, Pančevo and Osijek.

== Demographics ==
Village of Kabalna: Population trends 1857–2021
v

population									69	241	232	53
	1857	1869	1880	1890	1900	1910	1921	1931	1948	1953	1961	1971	1981	1991	2001	2011	2021

Note:Part of Ivanovo from 1948 to 1961, counted separately in 1971 then under Bockovac from 1981 on. Sources: Croatian Bureau of Statistics publications

== Bibliography ==
- Škiljan, Filip; Volner, Hrvoje (2023-12-12). "Identitet i sjećanje - Srbi u donjomiholjačkom kraju" [Identity and Memory - Serbs in the area of Donji Miholjac]. Tragovi: časopis za srpske i hrvatske teme (in Serbo-Croatian). 6 (2): 52–86. doi:10.52328/t.6.2.2. eISSN 2718-3467.
- TZ Donji Miholjac (2023). "Prigradska naselja grada Donjeg Miholjca" [Suburban Villages of the City of Donji Miholjac]. Turistička zajednica grada Donjeg Miholjca (in Serbo-Croatian). Archived from the original on 2025-09-01.
