= Viljevo =

- Municipality
- Location in Croatia Viljevo (Croatia)
- Coordinates: 45.75°N 18.06°E
- Country: Croatia
- Region: Slavonia
- County: Osijek-Baranja County

Government
  - Mayor: Ivan Fekete

Area
  - Municipality: 111.3 km^{2} (43.0 sq mi)
  - Urban: 38.5 km^{2} (14.9 sq mi)

Population (2021)
  - Municipality: 1,626
  - Density: 14.61/km^{2} (37.84/sq mi)
  - Urban: 987
  - Urban density: 25.6/km^{2} (66.4/sq mi)
- Time zone: UTC+1 (Central European Time)
- Website: viljevo.hr

Viljevo (Serbian Cyrillic: Виљево, Hungarian: Villyó) is a village and a municipality in Osijek-Baranja County, Croatia.

In the 2011, there were 2,065 inhabitants, in the following settlements:

- Blanje, population 43
- Bockovac, population 51
- Cret Viljevski, population 80
- Ivanovo, population 290
- Kapelna, population 294
- Krunoslavje, population 89
- Viljevo, population 1,218

In the same census, 81.26% of the population were Croats, 16.46% Serbs, 1.36% Roma.

Colonist settlements of Blanje, Čret, and Krunoslavlje were established on the territory of the village municipality during the land reform in interwar Yugoslavia.

== Politics ==
=== Minority councils ===
Directly elected minority councils and representatives are tasked with consulting the local or regional authorities to advocate for minority rights and interests, integration into public life and participation in the management of local affairs. At the 2023 Croatian national minorities councils and representatives elections, Roma and Serbs of Croatia each fulfilled the legal requirements to elect 10 members municipal minority councils of the Viljevo Municipality.
