= Golinci =

- Village (Selo)
- Location of Golinci in Croatia
- Coordinates: 45°41′23″N 18°09′58″E
- Country: Croatia
- Region: Slavonia
- County: Osijek-Baranja
- Municipality: Donji Miholjac

Area
  - Total: 13.0 km^{2} (5.0 sq mi)
- Elevation: 96 m (315 ft)

Population (2021)
  - Total: 342
  - Density: 26.3/km^{2} (68.1/sq mi)
- Time zone: UTC+1 (CET)
  - Summer (DST): UTC+2 (CEST)
- Post code: 31543 Miholjački Poreč
- Area code: +385 (0)31
- Licence plate: NA

Golinci is a small village in Donji Miholjac township, Eastern Croatia. It is near the river Karašica, over which it once had a bridge. As of 2021, it has a population of 342.

== History ==
The former village of Kabalna, across the bridge over the Karašica, once belonged to it, administratively.

== Religion ==
The Sv. Ivana Glavosijeka church was built in 1890.

== Culture ==
It has a volunteer fire department, the DVD Golinci.

Recreational societies in Golinci include the Sport fishing club Linjak, the Soccer club Mladost and the Hunting society Kobac.

== Economy ==
Most villagers of Golinci are farmers, so there are only a few businesses, such as the vegetable company PZ-Matijević, goat cheese producer Vešligaj and mushroom farm Lavošević.

== Infrastructure ==
The school was built in 1880.

The village was electrified in 1960.

In 1967, a road was built through Golinci, and a sidewalk was added in 1978–1980. In 1990, the whole village was asphalted, and that asphalt was joined in 1992 to the neighbouring village Miholjački Poreč.

== Bibliography ==
- TZ Donji Miholjac (2023). "Prigradska naselja grada Donjeg Miholjca" [Suburban Villages of the City of Donji Miholjac]. Turistička zajednica grada Donjeg Miholjca (in Serbo-Croatian). Archived from the original on 2025-09-01.
