= Zvonimirovac =

Zvonimirovac may refer to:

- Zvonimirovac, a former name of Zvonimirovo, a village near Suhopolje, Croatia
- Zvonimirovac, Čađavica, a village near Slatina, Croatia
