= Radikovci =

- Village (Selo)
- Location of Radikovci in Croatia
- Coordinates: 45°41′37″N 18°13′00″E
- Country: Croatia
- County: Osijek-Baranja
- Municipality: Donji Miholjac

Area
  - Total: 9.1 km^{2} (3.5 sq mi)
- Elevation: 96 m (315 ft)

Population (2021)
  - Total: 246
  - Density: 27/km^{2} (70/sq mi)
- Time zone: UTC+1 (CET)
  - Summer (DST): UTC+2 (CEST)
- Post code: 31543 Miholjački Poreč
- Area code: +385 (0)31
- Licence plate: NA

Radikovci is a village in Croatia, located in the region of Slavonia, Osijek-Baranja County.
