= Podravska Moslavina =

- Municipality
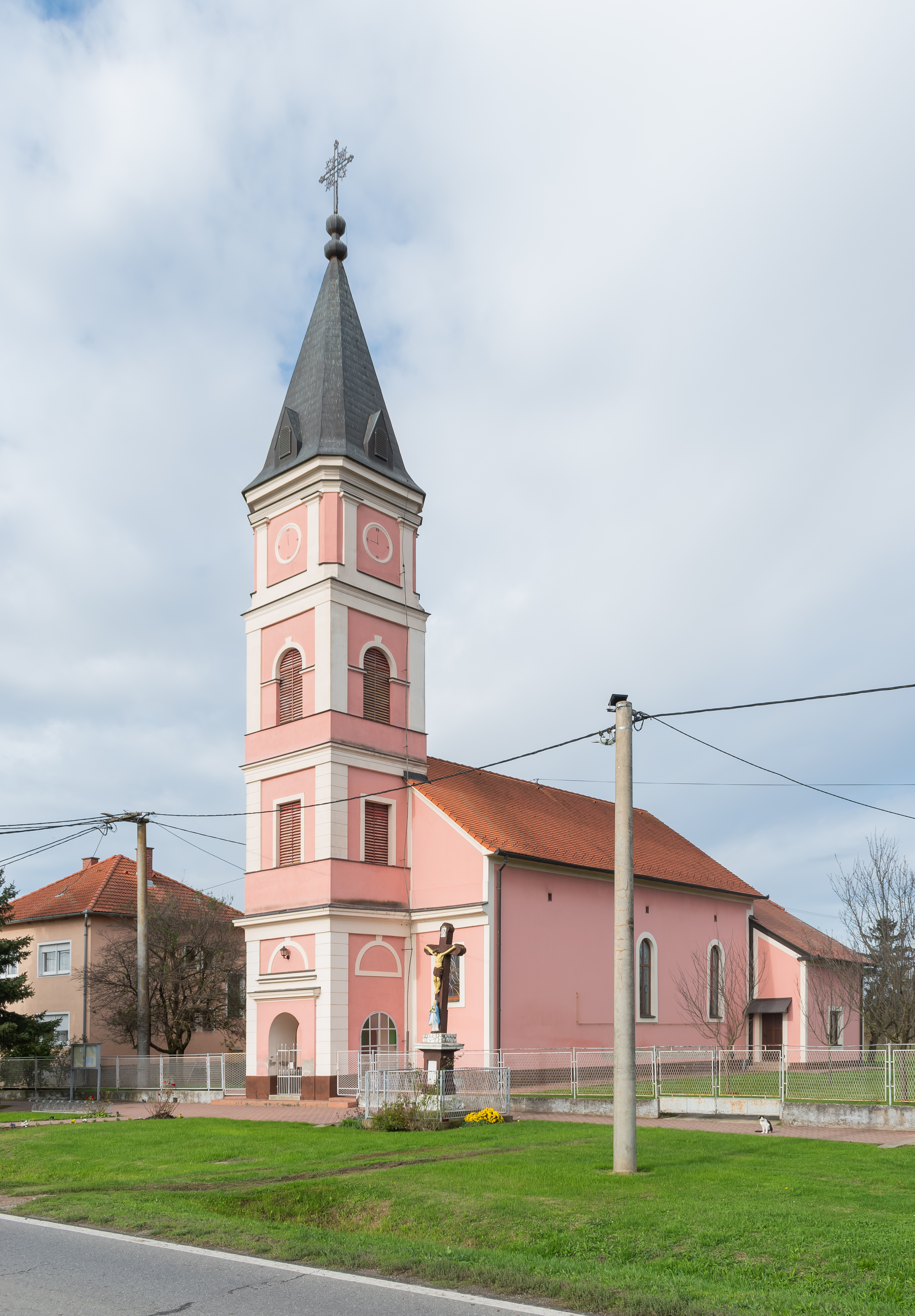
- Nativity of the Blessed Virgin Mary church in Podravska Moslavina

- Flag Coat of arms

- Location in Croatia
- Coordinates: 45.75°N 17.86°E
- Country: Croatia
- Region: Slavonia
- County: Osijek-Baranja County

Government
  - Mayor: Zdravko Šimara

Area
  - Municipality: 44.5 km^{2} (17.2 sq mi)
  - Urban: 17.5 km^{2} (6.8 sq mi)

Population (2021)
  - Municipality: 954
  - Density: 21.4/km^{2} (55.5/sq mi)
  - Urban: 655
  - Urban density: 37.4/km^{2} (96.9/sq mi)
- Time zone: UTC+1 (Central European Time)
- Website: podravskamoslavina.hr

Podravska Moslavina (Serbian Cyrillic: Подравска Мославина, Hungarian: Monoszló) is a village and a municipality in Osijek-Baranja County, Croatia.

In the 2011 census, there were 1,202 inhabitants in the municipality, in the following settlements:

- Gezinci, population 33
- Krčenik, population 334
- Martinci Miholjački, population 37
- Podravska Moslavina, population 798

Colonist settlements of Breštanovci, Martinci Miholjački, and Žabnjača were established on the territory of the village municipality during the land reform in interwar Yugoslavia.

== Politics ==
=== Minority councils ===
Directly elected minority councils and representatives are tasked with consulting the local and regional authorities, advocating for minority rights and interests, integration into public life and participation in the management of local affairs. At the 2023 Croatian national minorities councils and representatives elections, Serbs of Croatia fulfilled legal requirements to elect 10 members municipal minority councils of the Podravska Moslavina Municipality but the elections were not held due to the lack of candidates.
