= Sopje =

- Location within Croatia
- Coordinates: 45°48′03.96″N 17°44′33.00″E
- Country: Croatia
- County: Virovitica-Podravina County

Area
  - Total: 117.2 km^{2} (45.3 sq mi)

Population (2021)
  - Total: 1,897
  - Density: 16.19/km^{2} (41.92/sq mi)
- Time zone: UTC+1 (CET)
  - Summer (DST): UTC+2 (CEST)
- Website: sopje.hr

Sopje is a village and a municipality in Croatia in the Virovitica–Podravina County.

In the 2011 census, Sopje had a total population of 2,230, in the following settlements:

- Gornje Predrijevo, population 86
- Grabić, population 122
- Josipovo, population 281
- Kapinci, population 186
- Nova Šarovka, population 250
- Novaki, population 349
- Sopjanska Greda, population 35
- Sopje, population 524
- Španat, population 172
- Vaška, population 315
- Višnjica, no population

At the time of Ancient Rome, there was a salt lake called Salapia somewhere in Interamnia (modern-day Slavonia). It's been suggested that the name Sopje derives from its name.

Colonist settlements of Bobovac and Sopjanska Greda were established on the territory of the village municipality during the land reform in interwar Yugoslavia.

== Politics ==
=== Minority councils ===
Directly elected minority councils and representatives are tasked with consulting tasks for the local or regional authorities in which they are advocating for minority rights and interests, integration into public life and participation in the management of local affairs. At the 2023 Croatian national minorities councils and representatives elections Serbs of Croatia fulfilled legal requirements to elect 10 members minority councils of the Municipality of Sopje but with only 7 representatives being elected in the body in the end.
