= Šag =

- Village (Selo)
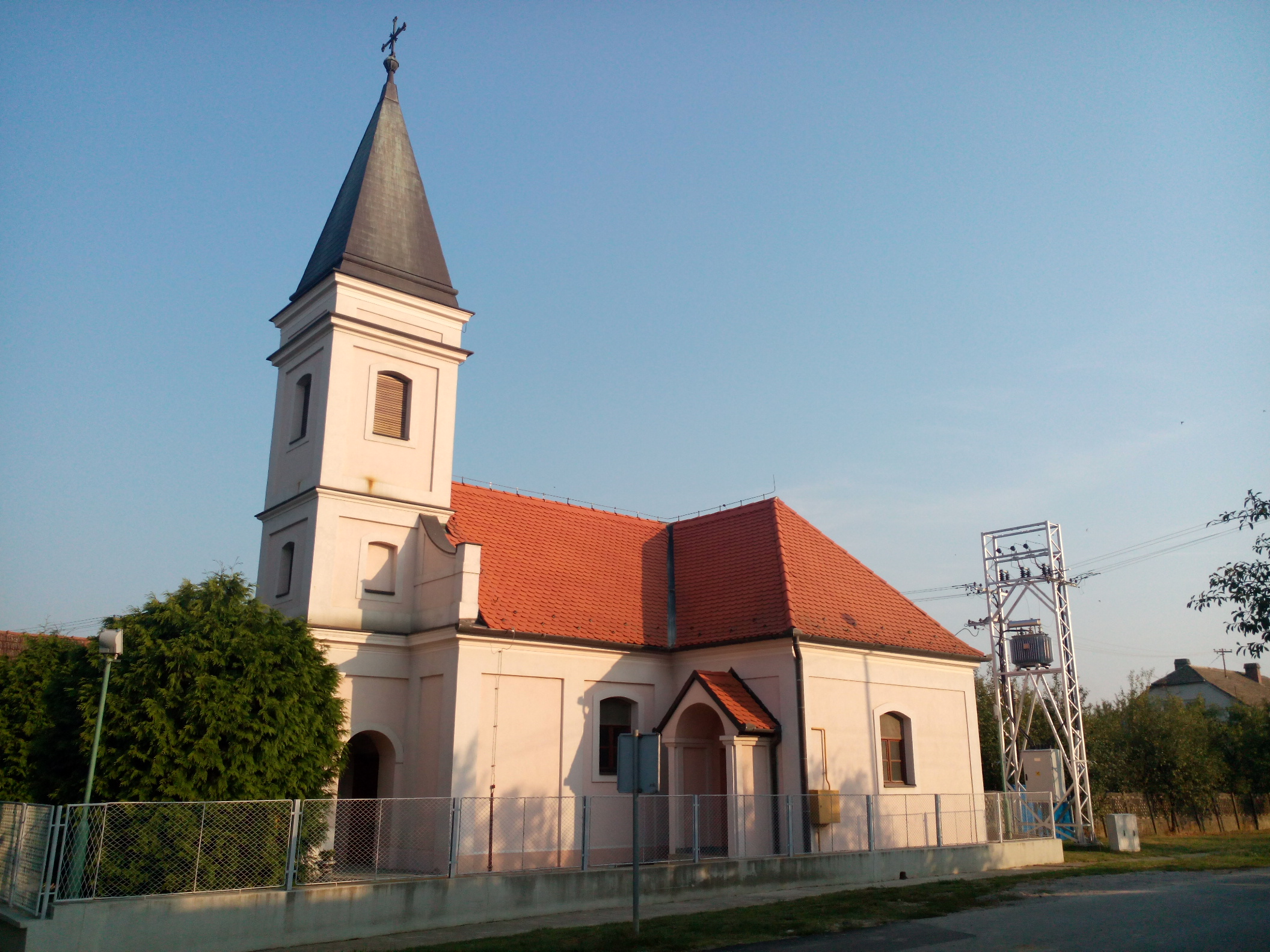

- Location within Osijek-Baranja County Location within Croatia Location within Europe
- Country: Croatia
- County: Osijek-Baranja
- Municipality: Valpovo

Area
  - Total: 6.4 km^{2} (2.5 sq mi)

Population (2021)
  - Total: 426
  - Density: 67/km^{2} (170/sq mi)
- Time zone: UTC+1 (CET)
  - Summer (DST): UTC+2 (CEST)

Šag is a village in Croatia. It is connected by the D34 highway.
