= Podgajci Podravski =

- Village (Selo)
- Location within Osijek-Baranja County Location within Croatia Location within Europe
- Country: Croatia
- County: Osijek-Baranja
- Municipality: Donji Miholjac

Area
  - Total: 18.7 km^{2} (7.2 sq mi)
- Elevation: 98 m (322 ft)

Population (2021)
  - Total: 543
  - Density: 29.0/km^{2} (75.2/sq mi)
- Time zone: UTC+1 (CET)
  - Summer (DST): UTC+2 (CEST)
- Postal code: 31552 Podgajci Podravski
- Area code: +385 (0)31
- Licence plate: NA

Podgajci Podravski is a village in Croatia. It is connected by the D34 highway.
