= Gezinci =

- Village (Selo)
- Location within Osijek-Baranja County Location within Croatia Location within Europe
- Country: Croatia
- County: Osijek-Baranja County
- Municipality: Podravska Moslavina

Area
  - Total: 0.2 km^{2} (0.077 sq mi)

Population (2021)
  - Total: 24
  - Density: 120/km^{2} (310/sq mi)
- Time zone: UTC+1 (CET)
  - Summer (DST): UTC+2 (CEST)

Gezinci is a village in Croatia. It is connected by the D34 highway.
