= Čađavica, Croatia =

Čađavica
- Interactive map of Čađavica
- Location within Croatia
- Coordinates: 45°44′33″N 17°51′18″E
- Country: Croatia
- County: Virovitica-Podravina County

Area
  - Total: 91.1 km^{2} (35.2 sq mi)

Population (2021)
  - Total: 1,555
  - Density: 17.1/km^{2} (44.2/sq mi)
- Time zone: UTC+1 (CET)
  - Summer (DST): UTC+2 (CEST)
- Website: opcina-cadjavica.hr

Čađavica is a village and municipality in Croatia in the Virovitica–Podravina County.

It is situated 14 kilometers northeast of Slatina. The navigable part of Drava river starts in the vicinity of Čađavica.

In the 2011 census, it had a total population of 2,009, in the following settlements:

- Čađavica, population 678
- Čađavički Lug, population 277
- Donje Bazije, population 148
- Ilmin Dvor, population 53
- Noskovačka Dubrava, population 59
- Noskovci, population 195
- Starin, population 80
- Šaševo, population 114
- Vraneševci, population 152
- Zvonimirovac, population 253

In the same census, 90% of the population were Croats.

Until 1920 Čađavica was part of the Virovitica County. The mother of the Hungarian Nobel-prize winner Georg von Békésy, Paula Mazaly was born here in 1877.

Colonist settlements of Dravica, Ilmin Dvor, and Noskovačka Dubrava were established on the territory of the municipality of the village during the land reform in interwar Yugoslavia.

== Politics ==
=== Minority councils ===
Directly elected minority councils and representatives are tasked with consulting tasks for the local or regional authorities in which they are advocating for minority rights and interests, integration into public life and participation in the management of local affairs. At the 2023 Croatian national minorities councils and representatives elections Serbs of Croatia fulfilled legal requirements to elect 10 members minority councils of the Municipality of Čađavica.
