= Josipovo =

- Location within Croatia
- Coordinates: 45°46′25″N 17°41′34″E
- Country: Croatia
- County: Virovitica-Podravina County

Area
  - Total: 4.7 km^{2} (1.8 sq mi)

Population (2021)
  - Total: 270
  - Density: 57/km^{2} (150/sq mi)
- Postal code: 33520

Josipovo is a village near Sopje, Croatia. It has a area of 4.6 km² (2.9 mi²)

== Demographics ==
As of 2021 Josipovo had 126 males and 144 females. With a total population of 270.

Year	2001	2011	2021
Population	332	281	270
