= Novi Senkovac =

Coordinates: 45°44′34″N 17°46′10″E

- Village
- Interactive map of Novi Senkovac
- Country: Croatia
- County: Virovitica-Podravina County
- Town: Slatina

Area
  - Total: 9.0 km^{2} (3.5 sq mi)

Population (2021)
  - Total: 223
  - Density: 25/km^{2} (64/sq mi)
- Time zone: UTC+1 (CET)
  - Summer (DST): UTC+2 (CEST)

Novi Senkovac is a village in Croatia. It is connected by the D34 highway.
