= 2019 Croatian national minorities councils and representatives elections =

2019 Croatian national minorities' councils and representatives elections
| ← 2015 | 5 May 2019 (first round); 19 May 2019 (second round) | 2023 → |

352 Councils and 109 Representatives
- Registered: 251,867
- Turnout: Counties: 31,755 (12.61%); Cities: 13,086 (10.9%); Municipalities: 14,204 (23.13%)
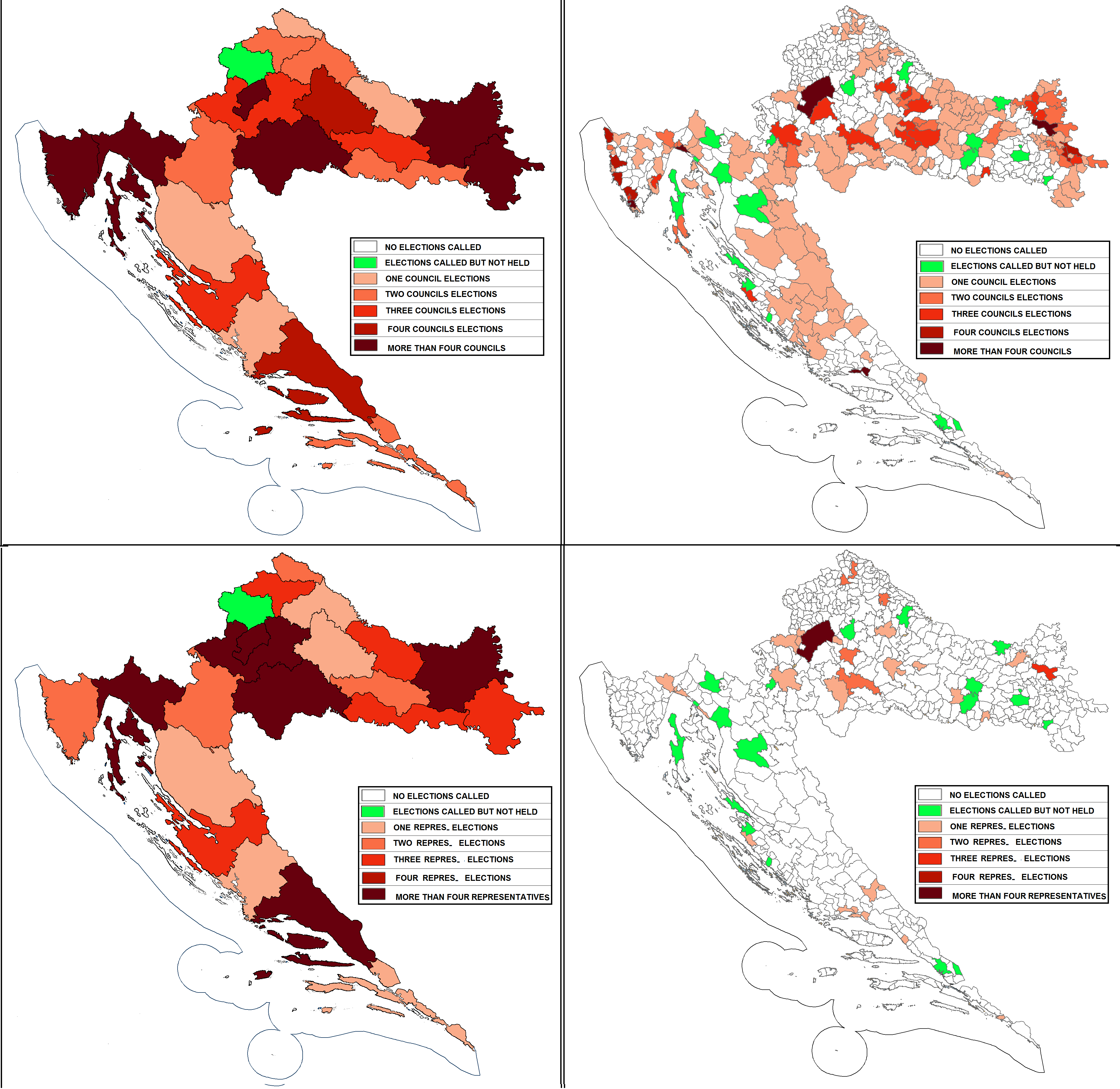
- Counties, cities and municipalities per number of councils or representatives.

The 2019 Croatian national minorities' councils and representatives elections took place on 5 May. The elections were the fifth minority elections since 2003 and near 254,000 citizens of Croatia were entitled to vote on them. In total, 352 councils and 109 representatives were up for election. 14 minority groups were electing their councils while 20 minority groups were electing representatives. 6,686 candidates in total participated in elections which were conducted at 846 polling places. Elections for councils took place in 19 counties of Croatia, City of Zagreb, 68 cities of Croatia and 108 municipalities of Croatia. Elections for representatives took place in 19 counties, City of Zagreb, 34 cities and one municipality.

Major challenge to this and all previous minority elections in Croatia is low voter turnout with 3,93% turnout from 07:00 till 11:30 A.M. Some media warned about possibility that minority elections risk being overshadowed by the campaign for the 2019 European Parliament election in Croatia which are taking place on May 26.

== Background ==
The first minority elections in Croatia were held in 2003 after the introduction of the Constitutional Act on the Rights of National Minorities in the Republic of Croatia in late 2002.

== Electoral system ==
Elections for councils and representatives are regulated by the Constitutional Act on the Rights of National Minorities in the Republic of Croatia and the Law on Election of Councils and Representatives of National Minorities. National minorities are electing municipal and county councils or representatives depending on relative and absolute minority population. Councils are elected in municipalities and cities in which minority population constitute at least 1,5% of the total population and there is at least 200 members of certain minority group. County councils are elected if there is more than 500 members of certain minority in a given Croatian county. Units with smaller numbers of members of certain minority, but in which there is still 100 or more members of given minority are electing minority representatives. 10 members are elected into municipal minority councils, 15 into city councils and 25 into county councils.

Minority elections are called by decision of the Government of the Republic of Croatia. The government called elections for 515 minority councils and 144 representatives. Candidates were not proposed for all councils and representatives which limited elections to 352 councils and 109 representatives. The State Election Commission is proposing to the government the fees for the work of the members of the electoral bodies. Bodies responsible for the implementation of the elections are the State Election Commission, county election commissions, the Election Commission of the City of Zagreb, town and municipal election commissions and polling boards. Contrary to other elections in Croatia in which an individual voter with prior registration can vote at any polling place in the country or abroad, voters at minority elections can vote exclusively in the place of permanent residence.

== Results ==
In the first round held on 5 May 2019, the turnout at the county level election was 31,755 or 12.61% of the 251,867 registered voters. On the city level, the turnout was 13,086 or 10.9%, and on the municipality level, the turnout was 14,204 or 23.13%. The second round was held on 19 May. A total of 5,029 candidates were elected.

== See also ==
- Elections in Croatia
