= Rakitovica =

- Village (Selo)
- Location of Rakitovica in Croatia
- Coordinates: 45°42′58″N 18°11′30″E
- Country: Croatia
- County: Osijek-Baranja
- Municipality: Donji Miholjac

Area
  - Total: 13.7 km^{2} (5.3 sq mi)
- Elevation: 95 m (312 ft)

Population (2021)
  - Total: 718
  - Density: 52.4/km^{2} (136/sq mi)
- Time zone: UTC+1 (CET)
  - Summer (DST): UTC+2 (CEST)
- Postal code: 31543 Miholjački Poreč
- Area code: +385 (0)31
- Licence plate: NA

Rakitovica is a village in Croatia.
