= Šaševo =

Coordinates: 45°44′40″N 17°49′48″E

- Village
- Interactive map of Šaševo
- Country: Croatia
- County: Virovitica-Podravina County
- Municipality: Čađavica

Area
  - Total: 3.0 km^{2} (1.2 sq mi)

Population (2021)
  - Total: 91
  - Density: 30/km^{2} (79/sq mi)
- Time zone: UTC+1 (CET)
  - Summer (DST): UTC+2 (CEST)

Šaševo is a village in Croatia. It is connected by the D34 highway.
