= Novaki, Virovitica-Podravina County =

Coordinates: 45°48′05″N 17°38′02″E

- Interactive map of Novaki, Virovitica-Podravina County

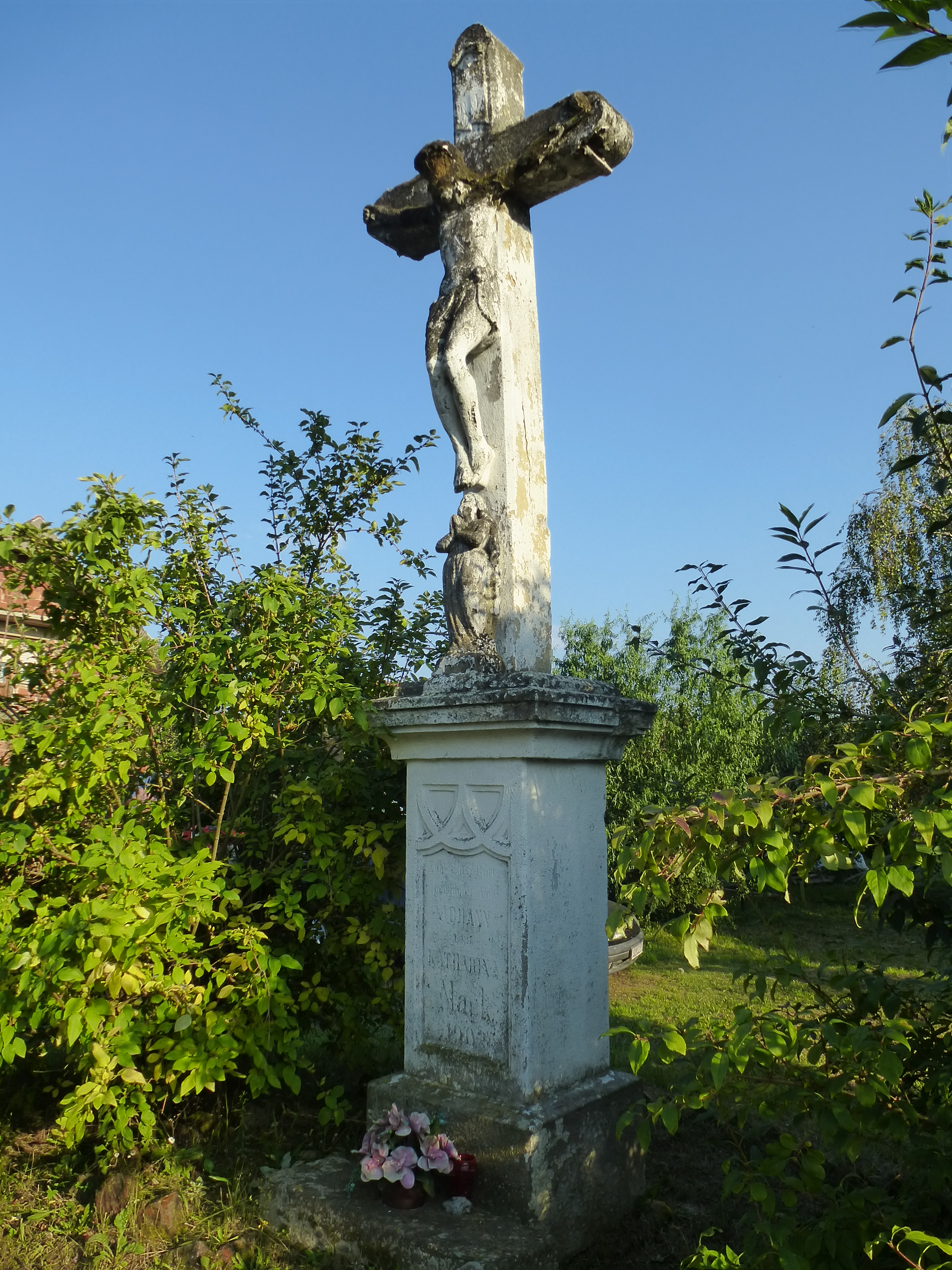
Wayside cross in Novaki, Sopje municipality, built by the Mack family in the early 1900s

Novaki is a village near Sopje, Croatia. In the 2011 census, it had 349 inhabitants.
