= Čađavički Lug =

Coordinates: 45°45′17″N 17°54′19″E

- Village
- Interactive map of Čađavički Lug
- Country: Croatia
- County: Virovitica-Podravina County
- Municipality: Čađavica

Area
  - Total: 10.0 km^{2} (3.9 sq mi)

Population (2021)
  - Total: 210
  - Density: 21/km^{2} (54/sq mi)
- Time zone: UTC+1 (CET)
  - Summer (DST): UTC+2 (CEST)

Čađavički Lug is a village in Croatia. It is connected by the D34 highway.
