= 2015 Croatian national minorities councils and representatives elections =

2015 Croatian national minorities' councils and representatives elections
← 2011	31 May 2015	2019 →
- Registered: 278.932
- Turnout: 13,5%

The 2015 Croatian national minorities' councils and representatives elections took place on 31 May. The elections were the fourth minority elections since 2003 and 278.932 citizens of Croatia were entitled to vote for councils and additional 24.399 for representatives. Citizens over the age of 18 who are members of a certain national minority group were entitled to vote. They had the right to vote in their municipality or town of residence for local council or representative of their minority if such elections are required based on an absolute or relative local minority population. 19 national minority groups in Croatia elected members of 288 councils and 173 individual minority representatives. Voters turnout was 13,5%.

Elections were called by the decision of the Government of Croatia. The decision was made based on the Constitutional Act on the Rights of National Minorities in the Republic of Croatia, and ordinary Law on Election of Members of Representative of Bodies of Local and Regional Self-Government Units and the Law on Local Elections. The Government spent 764.000 Croatian kuna for organization of the elections.

== See also ==
- Elections in Croatia
