= Črnkovci =

- Village (Selo)
- Location within Croatia
- Coordinates: 45°42′N 18°17′E
- Country: Croatia
- County: Osijek-Baranja
- Municipality: Marijanci

Area
  - Total: 8.8 km^{2} (3.4 sq mi)

Population (2021)
  - Total: 634
  - Density: 72/km^{2} (190/sq mi)
- Time zone: UTC+1 (CET)
  - Summer (DST): UTC+2 (CEST)

Črnkovci is a village in the municipality of Marijanci, Osijek-Baranja County, Croatia.

== Name ==
The name of the village in Croatian is plural.
