= Marijanci =

- Municipality
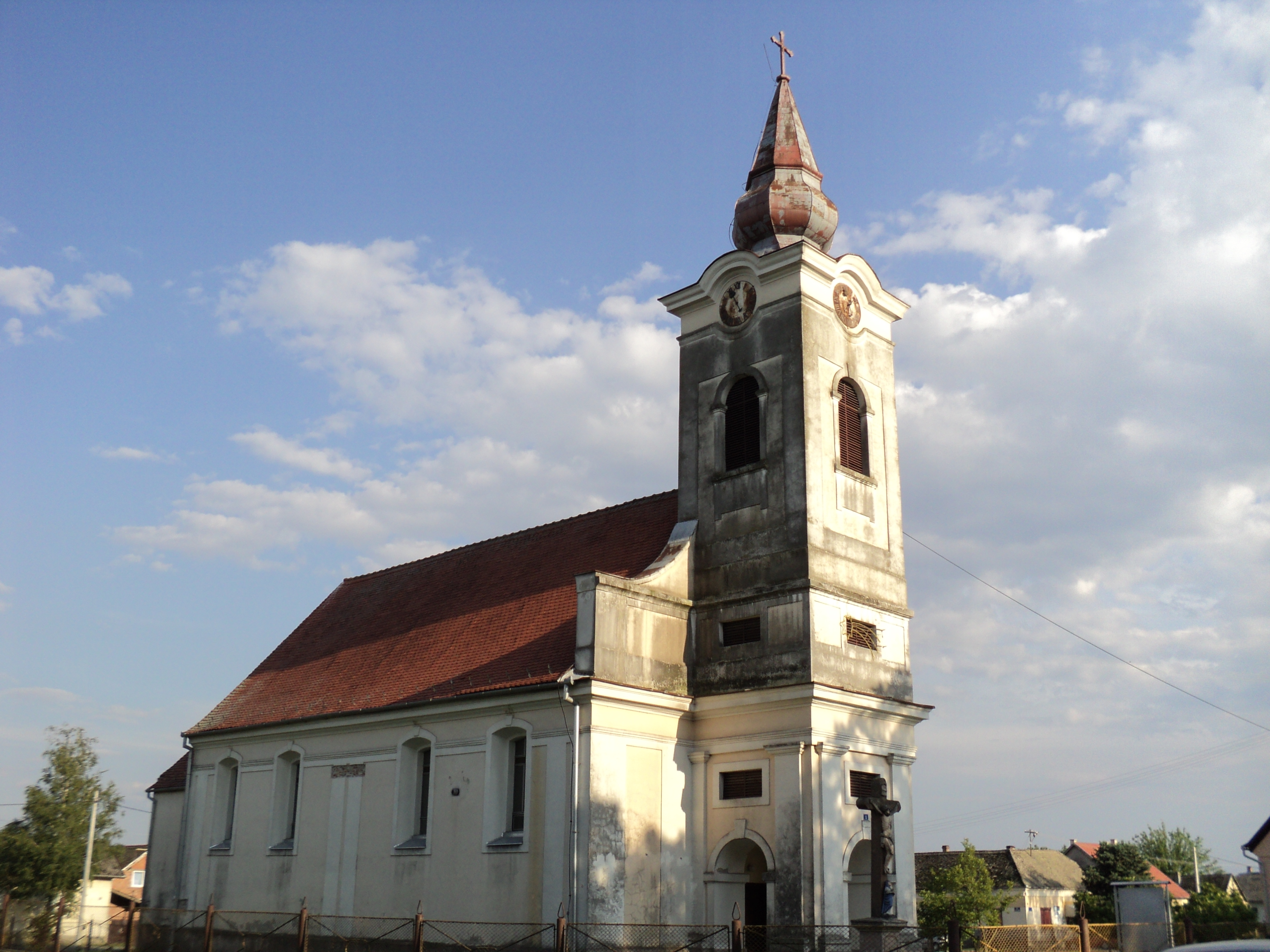

- Location in Croatia Marijanci (Croatia)
- Coordinates: 45.66°N 18.29°E
- Country: Croatia
- Region: Slavonia
- County: Osijek-Baranja County

Government
  - Mayor: Darko Dorkić

Area
  - Municipality: 65.6 km^{2} (25.3 sq mi)
  - Urban: 11.8 km^{2} (4.6 sq mi)

Population (2021)
  - Municipality: 1,951
  - Density: 29.7/km^{2} (77.0/sq mi)
  - Urban: 680
  - Urban density: 58/km^{2} (150/sq mi)
- Time zone: UTC+1 (Central European Time)
- Website: marijanci.hr

Marijanci (Hungarian: Mariánc) is a village and a municipality in Osijek-Baranja County, Croatia. There are 2,405 inhabitants in the municipality (2011 census), in the following settlements:

- Bočkinci, population 173
- Brezovica, population 53
- Čamagajevci, population 214
- Črnkovci, population 810
- Kunišinci, population 315
- Marijanci, population 838
- Marjanski Ivanovci, population 2

Colonist settlement of Brezovica was established on the territory of the village municipality during the land reform in interwar Yugoslavia.

== Name ==
The name of the village in Croatian is plural.
