= Čamagajevci =

- Village (Selo)
- Location within Osijek-Baranja County Location within Croatia Location within Europe
- Country: Croatia
- County: Osijek-Baranja County
- Municipality: Marijanci

Area
  - Total: 7.0 km^{2} (2.7 sq mi)

Population (2021)
  - Total: 178
  - Density: 25/km^{2} (66/sq mi)
- Time zone: UTC+1 (CET)
  - Summer (DST): UTC+2 (CEST)

Čamagajevci is a village in Croatia.

== Name ==
The name of the village in Croatian is plural.
