= Krčenik =

- Village (Selo)
- Location within Croatia
- Coordinates: 45°44′50″N 17°58′05″E
- Country: Croatia
- Region: Podravina
- County: Osijek-Baranja County
- Municipality: Podravska Moslavina

Area
  - Total: 18.6 km^{2} (7.2 sq mi)
- Elevation: 95 m (312 ft)

Population (2021)
  - Total: 252
  - Density: 13.5/km^{2} (35.1/sq mi)
- Time zone: UTC+1 (CET)
  - Summer (DST): UTC+2 (CEST)
- Postal code: 31530 Moslavina Podravska
- Area code: 031
- Vehicle registration: NA

Krčenik is a village in the municipality Podravska Moslavina, Osijek-Baranja County in Croatia. According to the 2001 census, there are 432 inhabitants, in 136 family households.
