= Noskovci =

Coordinates: 45°47′N 17°49′E

- Village
- Interactive map of Noskovci
- Country: Croatia
- County: Virovitica-Podravina County
- Municipality: Čađavica

Area
  - Total: 8.6 km^{2} (3.3 sq mi)

Population (2021)
  - Total: 142
  - Density: 17/km^{2} (43/sq mi)
- Time zone: UTC+1 (CET)
  - Summer (DST): UTC+2 (CEST)

Noskovci is a village in Croatia.
