= Nova Šarovka =

Coordinates: 45°45′27″N 17°44′55″E

- Village
- Interactive map of Nova Šarovka
- Country: Croatia
- County: Virovitica-Podravina County
- Municipality: Sopje

Area
  - Total: 8.2 km^{2} (3.2 sq mi)

Population (2021)
  - Total: 201
  - Density: 25/km^{2} (63/sq mi)
- Time zone: UTC+1 (CET)
  - Summer (DST): UTC+2 (CEST)

Nova Šarovka is a village in Croatia.
