= Donji Miholjac =

- Town
- Grad Donji Miholjac; Town of Donji Miholjac
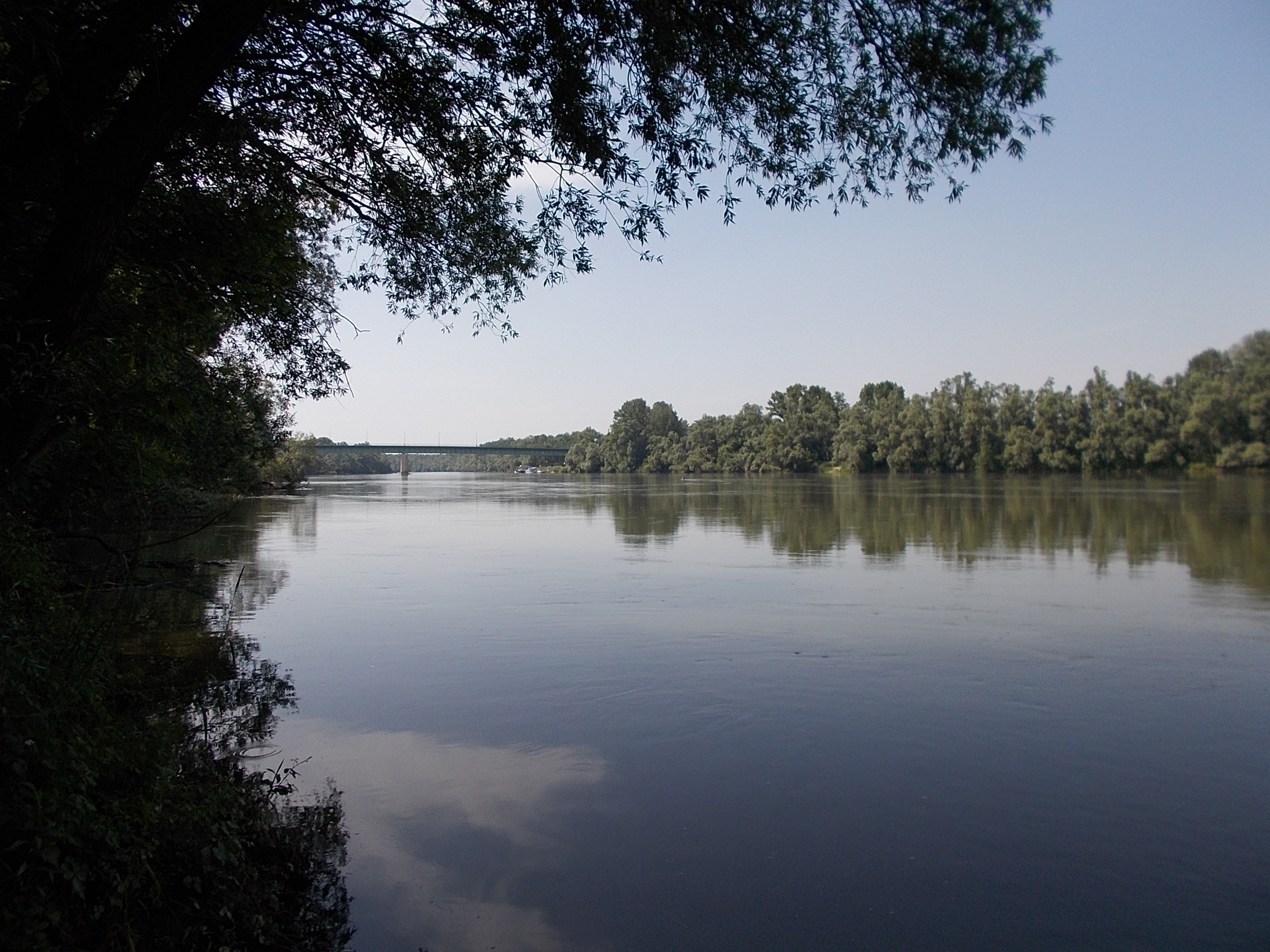
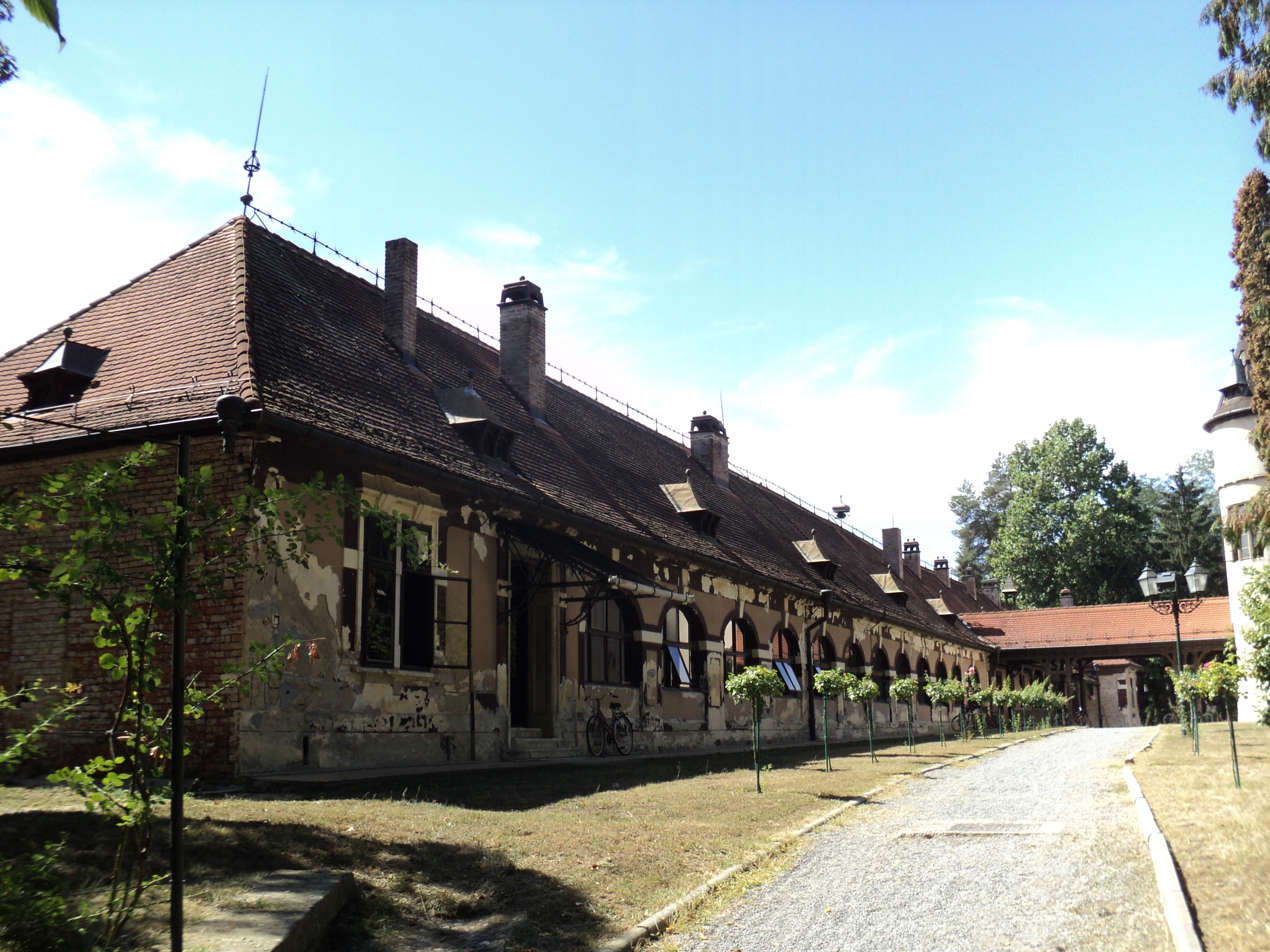
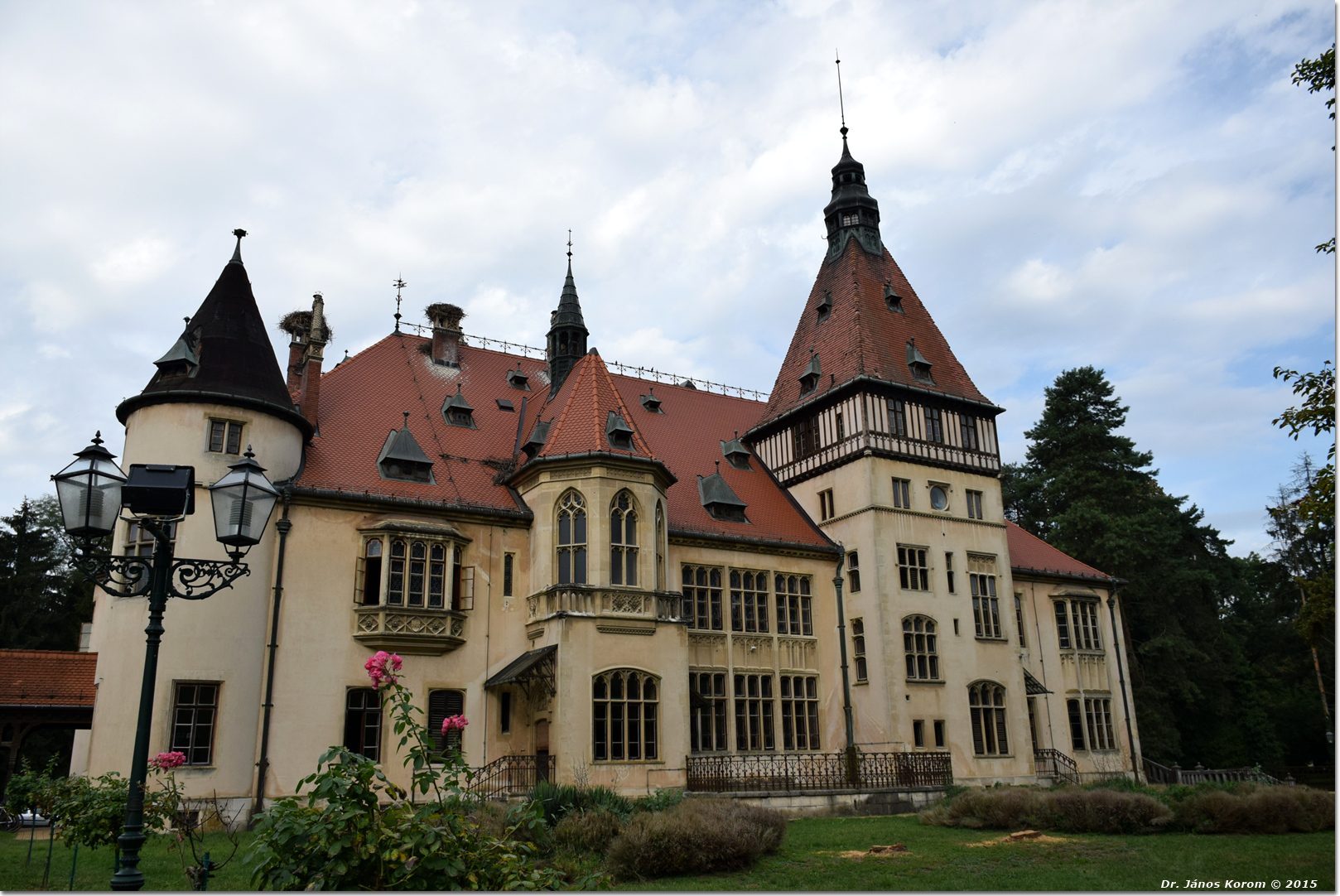
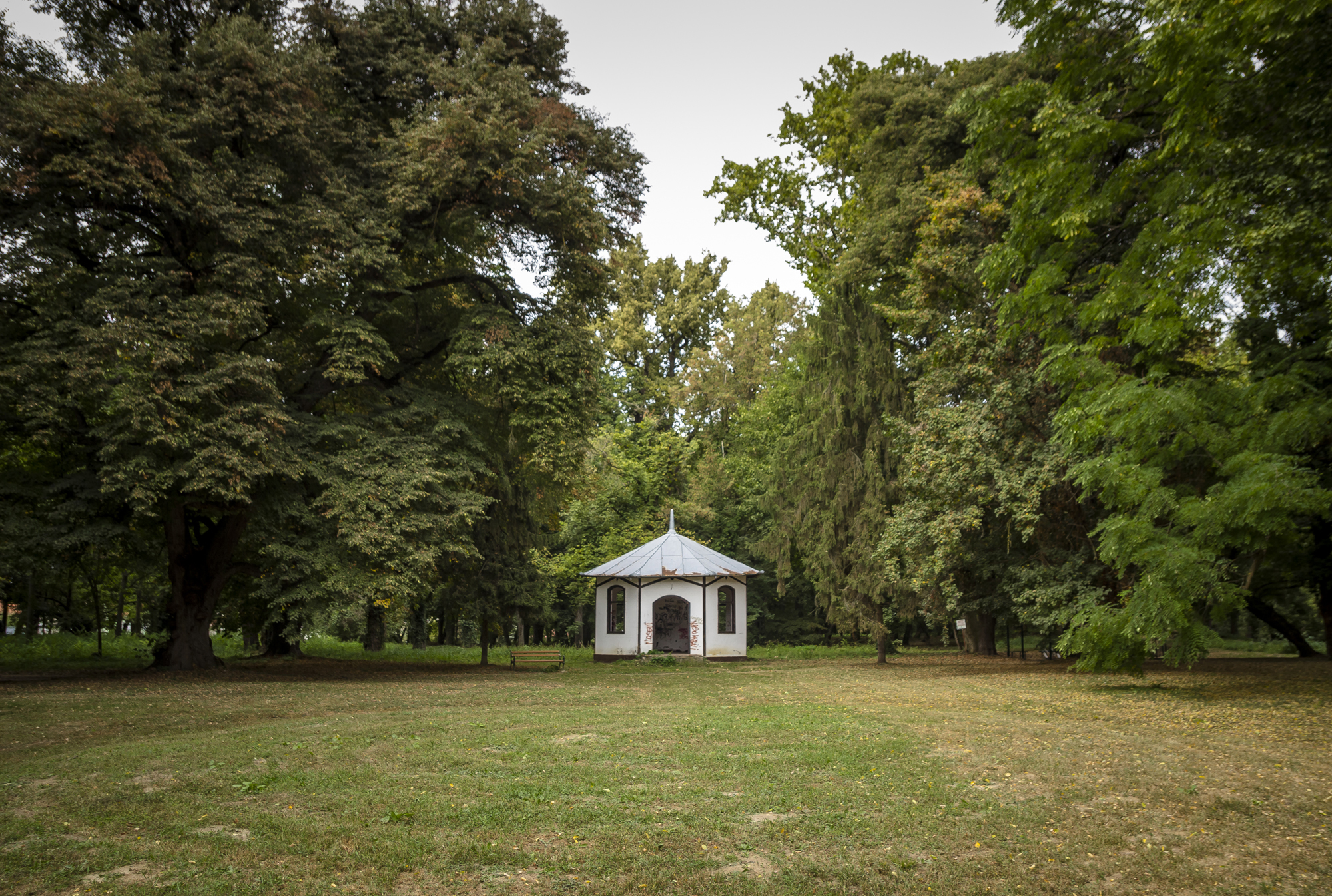
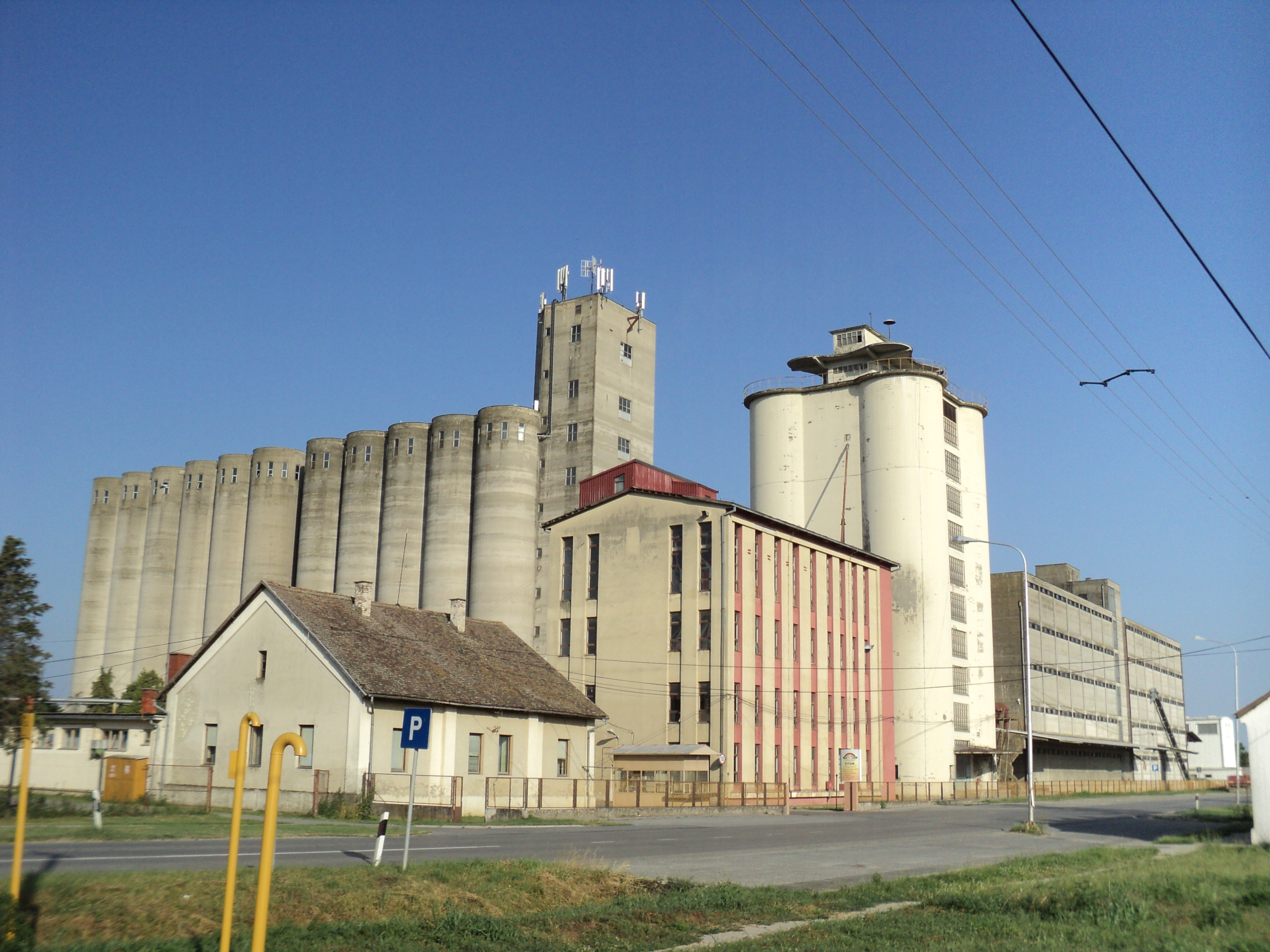
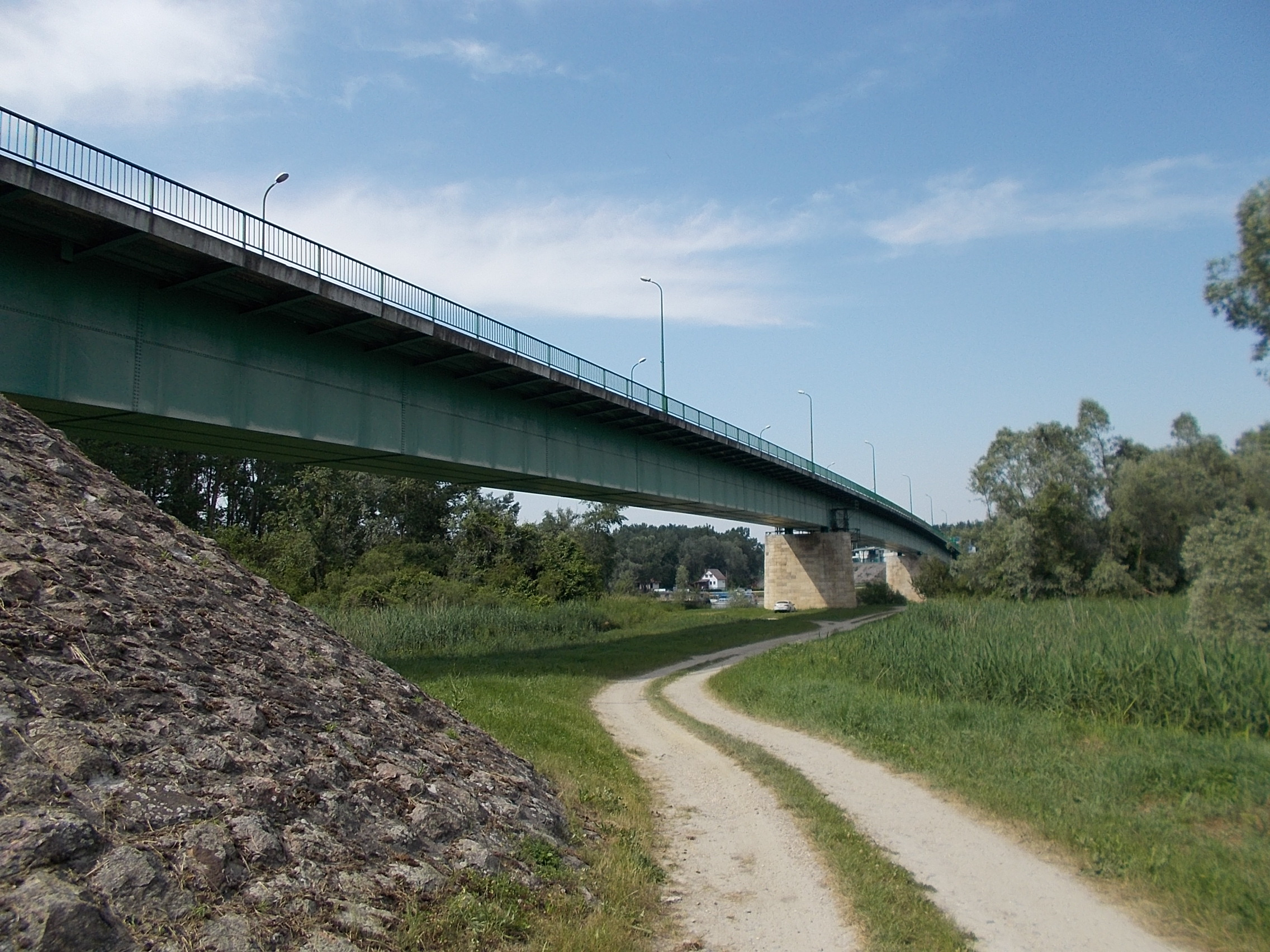
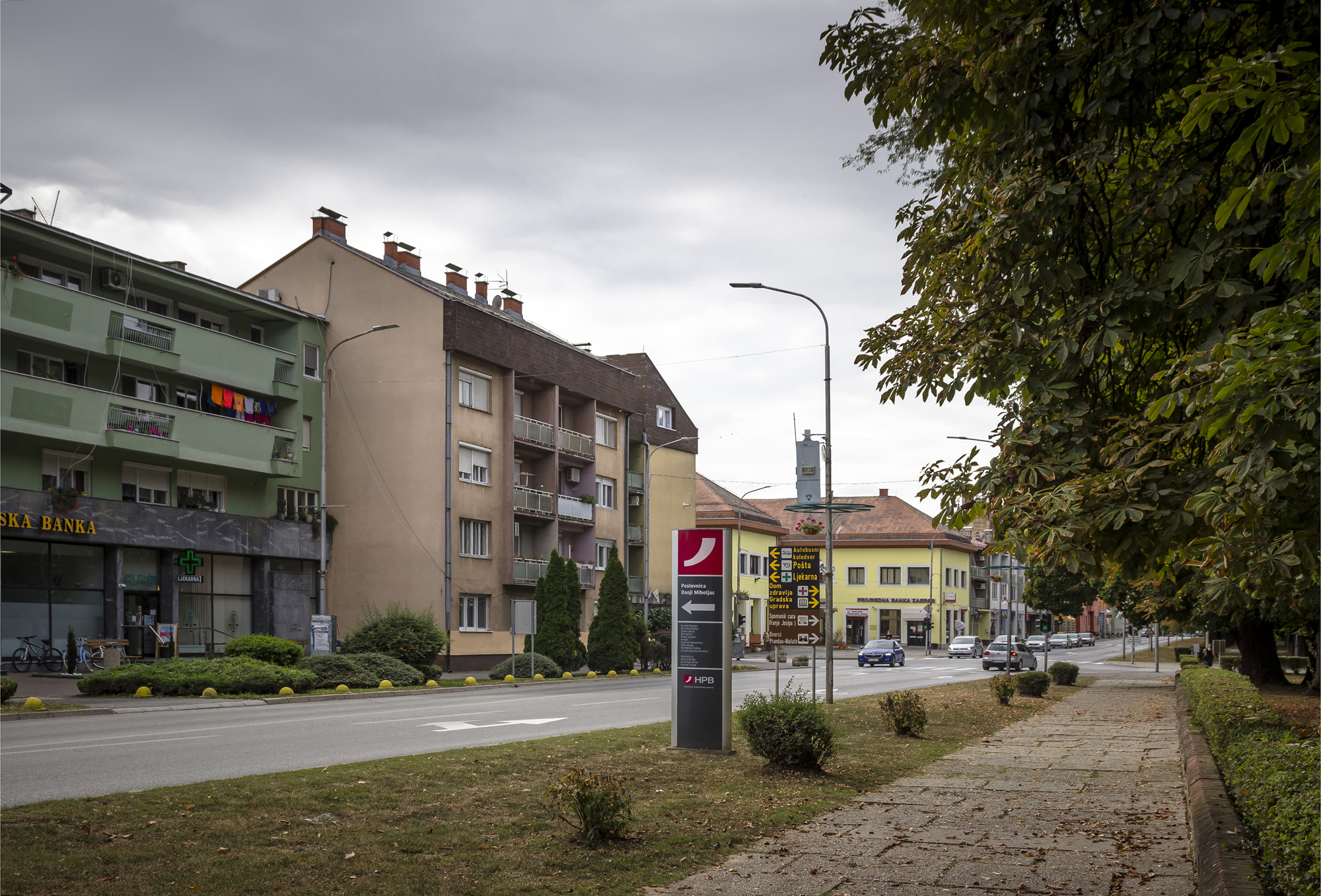
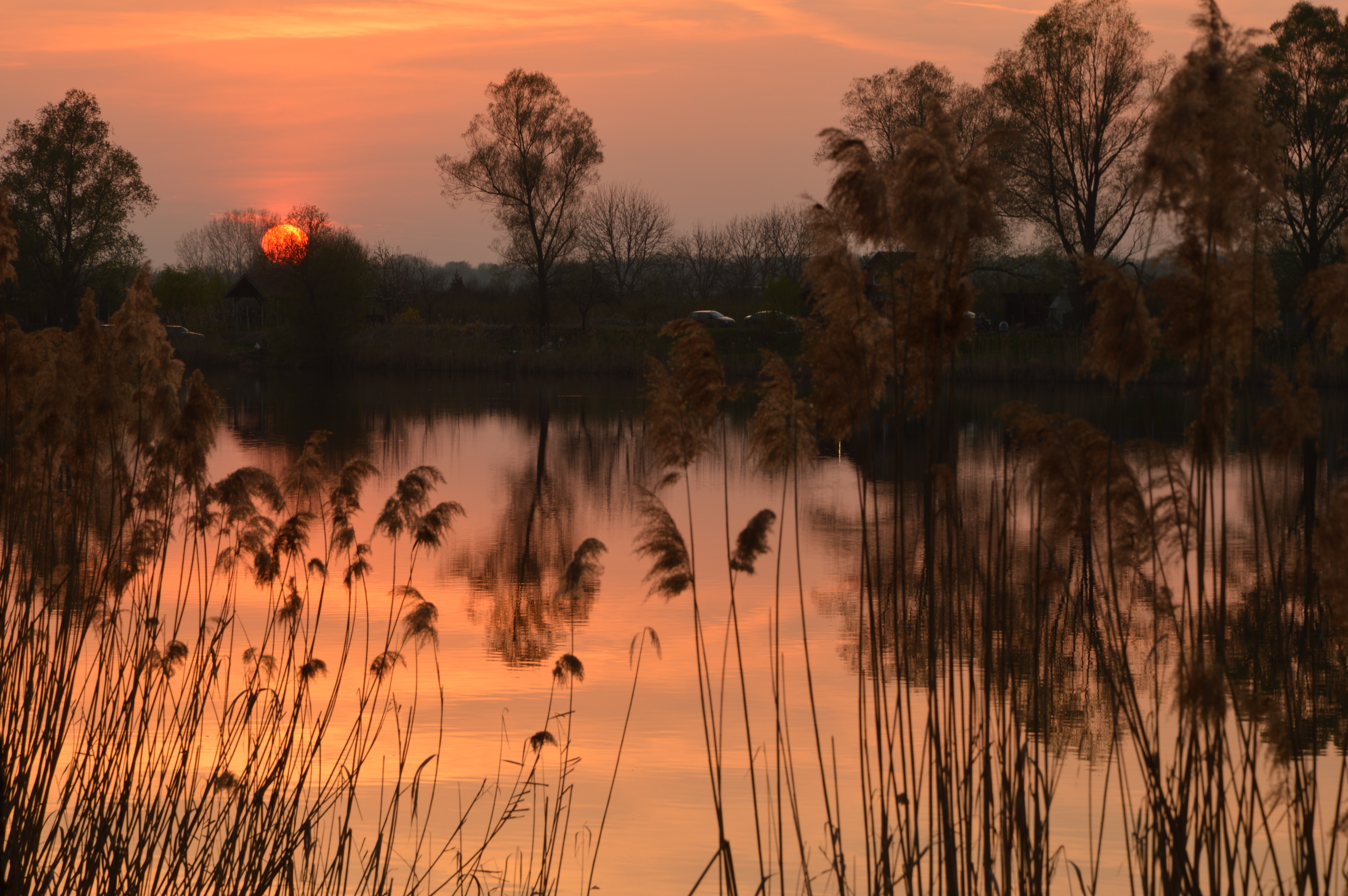
- Donji Miholjac

- Location of Donji Miholjac in Osijek-Baranja County Donji Miholjac (Croatia) Donji Miholjac (Europe)
- Coordinates: 45.761°N 18.165°E
- Country: Croatia
- Region: Slavonia (Podunavlje)
- County: Osijek-Baranja County

Government
  - Mayor: Dražen Trcović (HDZ)

Area
  - Town: 134.6 km^{2} (52.0 sq mi)
  - Urban: 59.7 km^{2} (23.1 sq mi)

Population (2021)
  - Town: 8,031
  - Density: 59.67/km^{2} (154.5/sq mi)
  - Urban: 5,330
  - Urban density: 89.3/km^{2} (231/sq mi)
- Time zone: UTC+1 (Central European Time)
- Website: donjimiholjac.hr

Donji Miholjac (Hungarian: Alsómiholjác, German: Unter-Miholtz), is a town in the Slavonia region of Croatia, on the river Drava and the border with Hungary.

== Climate ==
Since records began in 1954, the highest temperature recorded at the local weather station was 40.4 °C (104.7 °F), on 20 July 2007. The coldest temperature was −26.0 °C (−14.8 °F), on 23 January 1963.

== Population ==
In the 2011 census, there were 9,491 inhabitants in the area, 95% of them Croats.

Town of Donji Miholjac: Population trends 1857–2021
v

population	6136	6499	6101	7060	7821	8843	8769	8973	9660	10077	10225	9700	10003	10650	10265	9491	8031
	1857	1869	1880	1890	1900	1910	1921	1931	1948	1953	1961	1971	1981	1991	2001	2011	2021

Sources: Croatian Bureau of Statistics publications

== Settlements ==
There are seven settlements in the municipality:

- Donji Miholjac, population 6,240
- Golinci, population 431
- Miholjački Poreč, population 183
- Podgajci Podravski, population 651
- Radikovci, population 292
- Rakitovica, population 868
- Sveti Đurađ, population 826

== Politics ==
=== Minority councils ===
Directly elected minority councils and representatives are tasked with consulting the local or regional authorities, advocating for minority rights and interests, integration into public life and participation in the management of local affairs. At the 2023 Croatian national minorities councils and representatives elections Serbs of Croatia fulfilled legal requirements to elect 15 members minority councils of the Town of Donji Miholjac but the elections were not held due to the lack of candidates.

== History ==
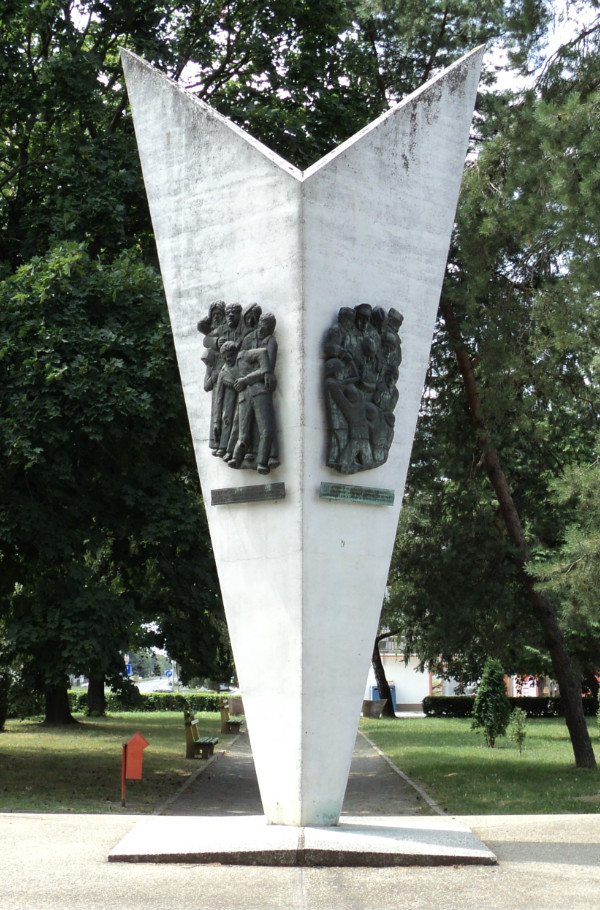
World War II memorial

In the late 19th and early 20th century, Donji Miholjac was a district capital in the Virovitica County of the Kingdom of Croatia-Slavonia. Its name comes from Saint Michael. During the time of Ancient Rome, it was called Mariniana. There are several suggested etymology for the name "Mariniana". One is that it comes from the Roman personal name "Marinus". The other is that it comes from the Indo-European roots *mory and *h1ny, so that it means "marshy valley". If so, the same root is seen in the names "Mursa" and "Marsonia".

Colonist settlements of Bockovac and Gložđe were established on the territory of the town municipality during the land reform in interwar Yugoslavia.

== Literature ==
- Obad Šćitaroci, Mladen; Bojanić Obad Šćitaroci, Bojana; Dundović, Boris (2013). "Manors and Gardens in Northern Croatia in the Age of Historicism" (PDF). Centropa. pp. 175–186. ISSN 1532-5563. Archived from the original (PDF) on 2025-05-05.
