= Zvonimirovac, Čađavica =

Settlement in Virovitica-Podravina County, Croatia

Zvonimirovac
- Settlement
- Interactive map of Zvonimirovac
- Location of Zvonimirovac in Croatia
- Coordinates: 45°42′50″N 17°52′08″E
- Country: Croatia
- County: Virovitica-Podravina County
- Municipality: Čađavica

Area
  - Total: 7.3 km^{2} (2.8 sq mi)

Population (2021)
  - Total: 192
  - Density: 26/km^{2} (68/sq mi)
- Time zone: UTC+1 (CET)
  - Summer (DST): UTC+2 (CEST)
- Postal code: 33520 Slatina
- Area code: +385 (0)33

Zvonimirovac is a settlement in the Municipality of Čađavica in Croatia. In 2021, its population was 192.

== Demographics ==
Zvonimirovac: Population trends 1857–2021
v

population		144	158	155	159	184	145	845	1058	1150	998	818	572	441	341	253	192
	1857	1869	1880	1890	1900	1910	1921	1931	1948	1953	1961	1971	1981	1991	2001	2011	2021

Sources: Croatian Bureau of Statistics publications
