= Miholjački Poreč =

- Village (Selo)
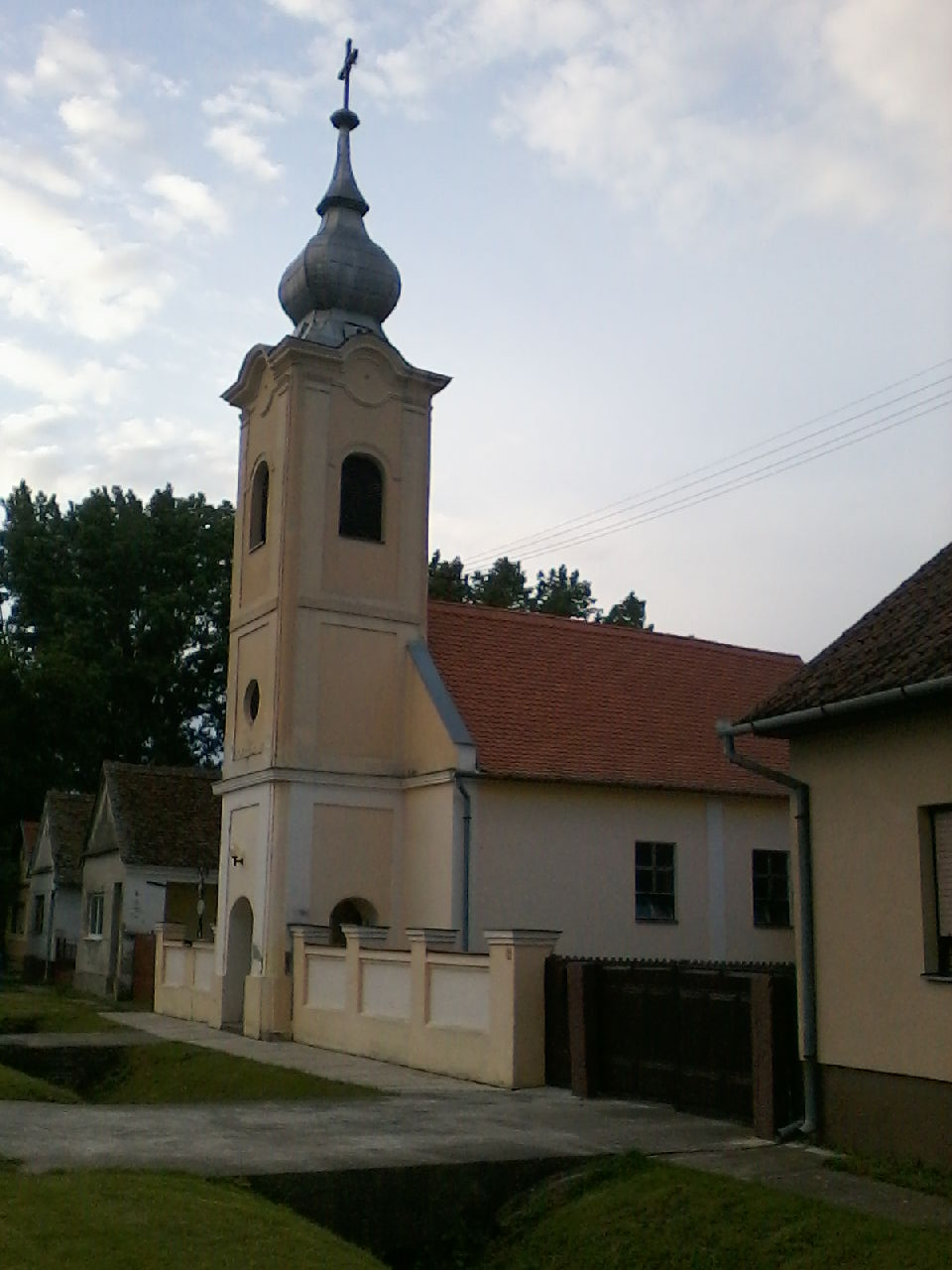
- A village church

- Location of Miholjački Poreč in Croatia
- Coordinates: 45.697°N 18.197°E
- Country: Croatia
- County: Osijek-Baranja
- Municipality: Donji Miholjac

Area
  - Total: 1.4 sq mi (3.6 km^{2})

Population (2021)
  - Total: 148
  - Density: 110/sq mi (41/km^{2})
- Time zone: UTC+1 (CET)
  - Summer (DST): UTC+2 (CEST)

Miholjački Poreč is a village in the region of Osijek-Baranja in Croatia.
