= Ivanovo, Croatia =

Ivanovo Gložđe
- Village (Selo)
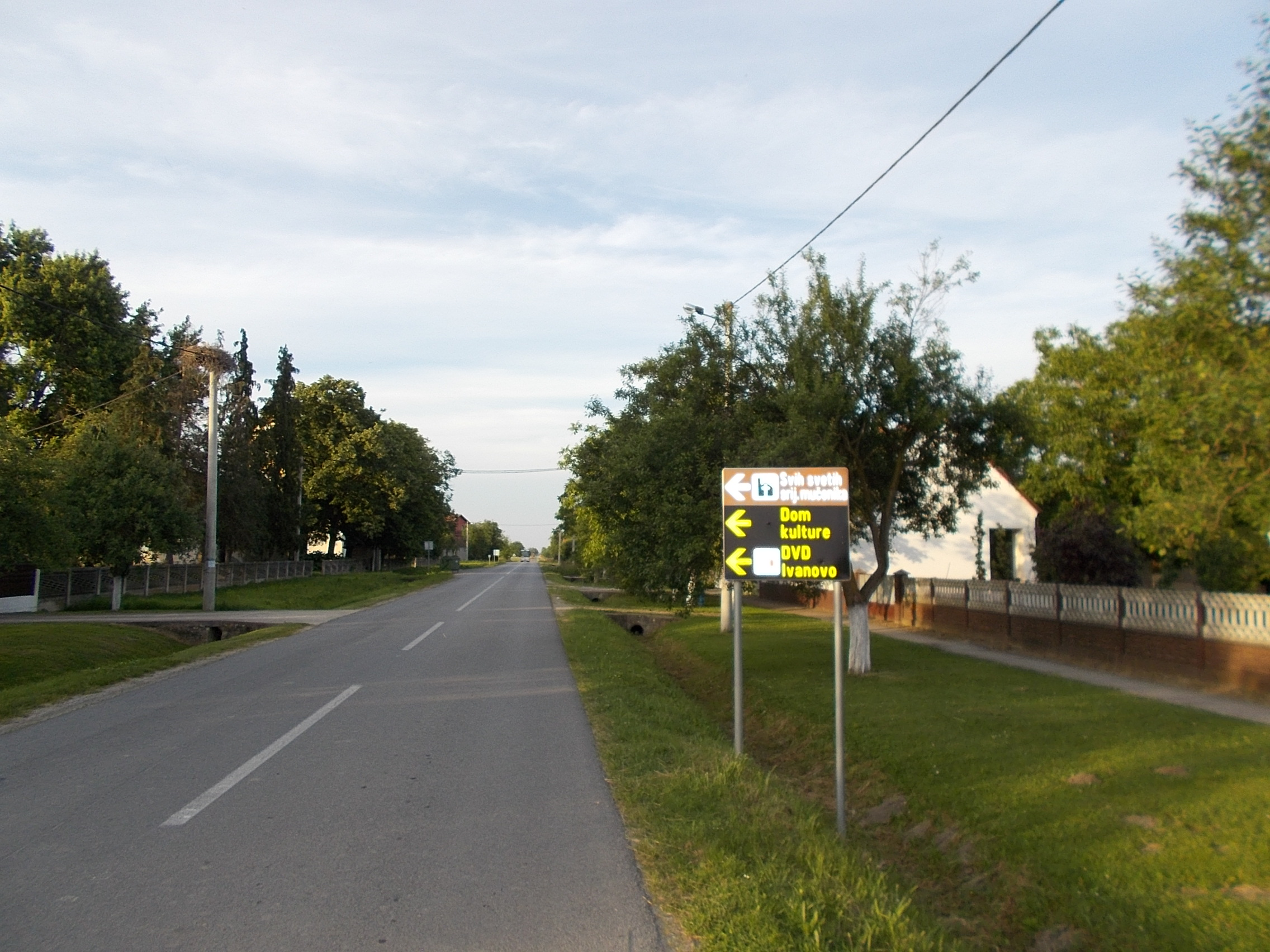
- Street of Ivanovo, Croatia

- Location within Osijek-Baranja County Location within Croatia Location within Europe
- Country: Croatia

Area
  - Total: 2.9 sq mi (7.5 km^{2})

Population (2021)
  - Total: 224
  - Density: 77/sq mi (30/km^{2})
- Time zone: UTC+1 (CET)
  - Summer (DST): UTC+2 (CEST)
- Postal code: 31540

Ivanovo is a village in Croatia.
