= 2023 Croatian national minorities councils and representatives elections =

2023 Croatian national minorities' councils and representatives elections
← 2019	7 May 2023 (first round)	2027 →

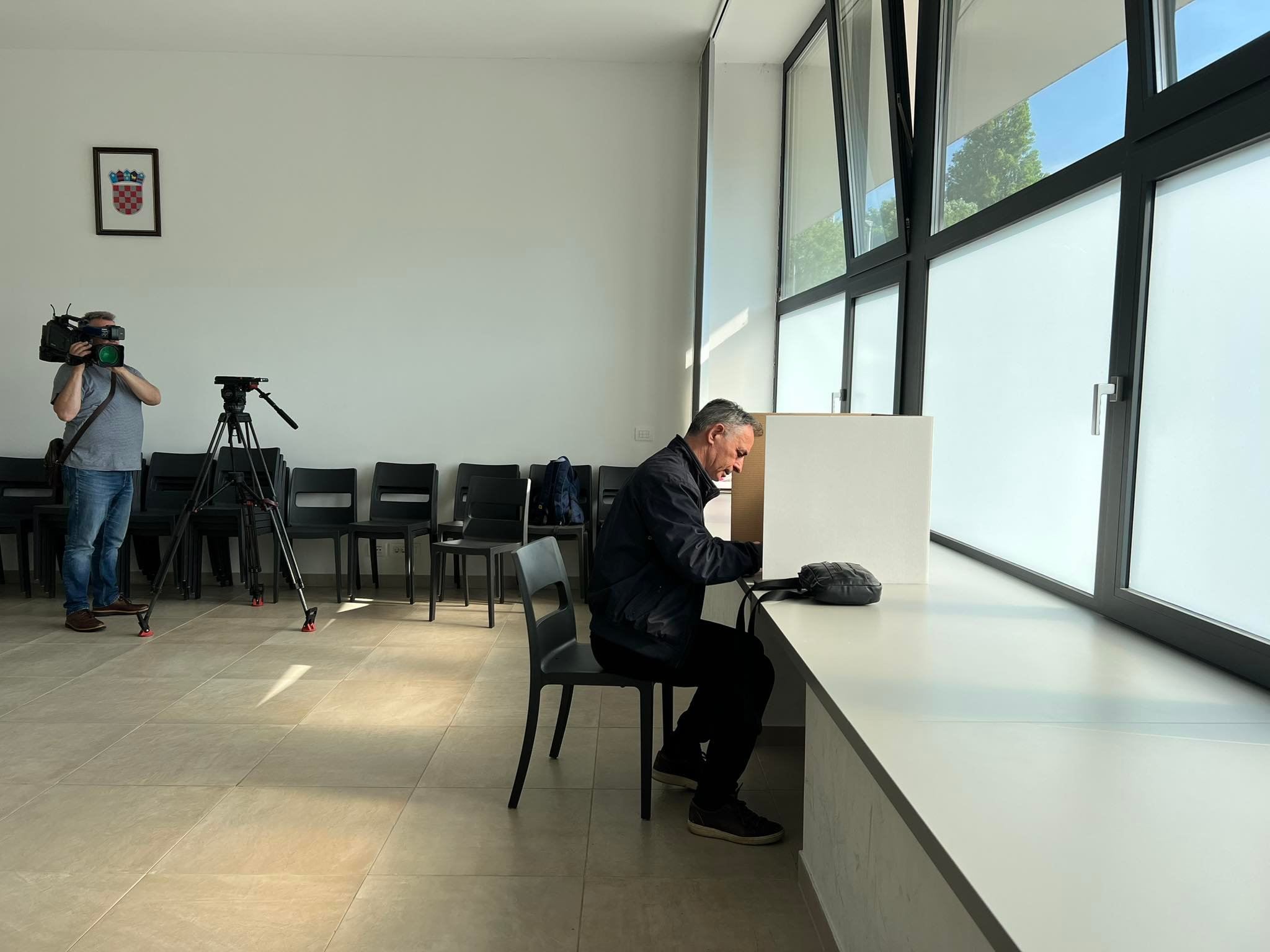
Milorad Pupovac at the Serb National Minority Council elections in Zagreb.

The 2023 Croatian national minorities councils and representatives elections (Croatian: Izbori za članove vijeća i predstavnike nacionalnih manjina) were held on 7 May in certain regional (counties) and local administrative units (municipalities and towns & cities).

== Background ==
Elections were announced in Narodne novine following the decision of the Government of the Republic of Croatia. Each of 22 traditional national minority enumerated in the preamble of the Constitution of Croatia is entitled to elect local or regional council in administrative units in which legal conditions are met with many units electing multiple councils for different minorities. 14 minorities fulfilled conditions to organize councils elections and 19 to organize representative elections with many electing first or the second in different electoral units.

The State Electoral Commission of the Republic of Croatia announced the election in mid March of 2023. The State Electoral Commission called upon the electorate and candidates to check if their status is appropriately registered in the electorate lists no later than 26 of March 2023. Elections were called for 451 councils and 141 representatives but in the end candidates were registered only for 352 councils and 109 representatives. Out of total number of missing candidatures for 112 councils and 35 representatives 54 belonged to councils or representatives of Serbs of Croatia and 14 belonged to Bosniaks of Croatia with minority councils and representatives elections regularly facing very low levels of the electorate turnout. Only citizens whose identity belonging to a national minority is registered in the state electorate lists can participate in minority elections either as candidates or voters.

== Electoral system ==
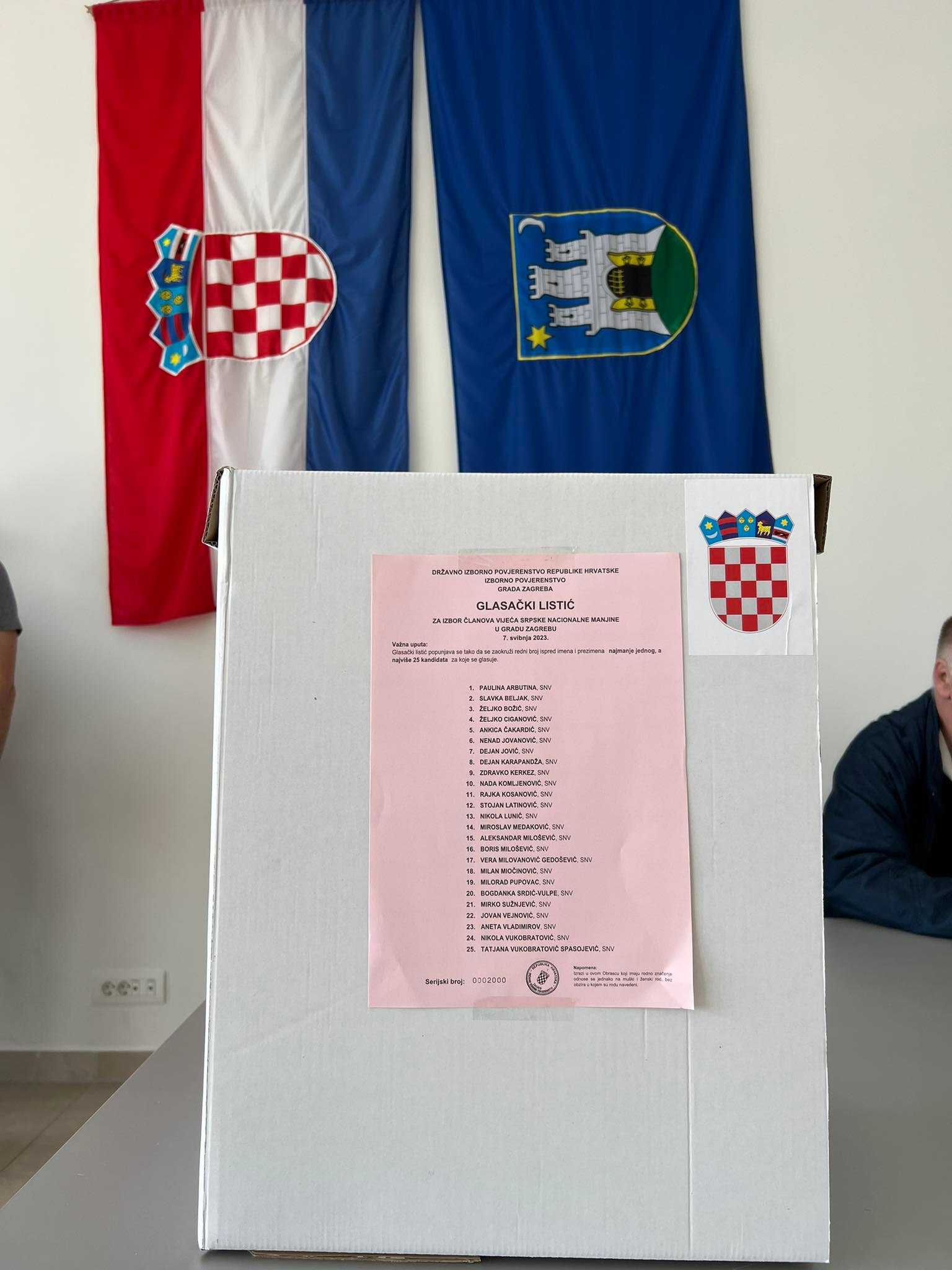
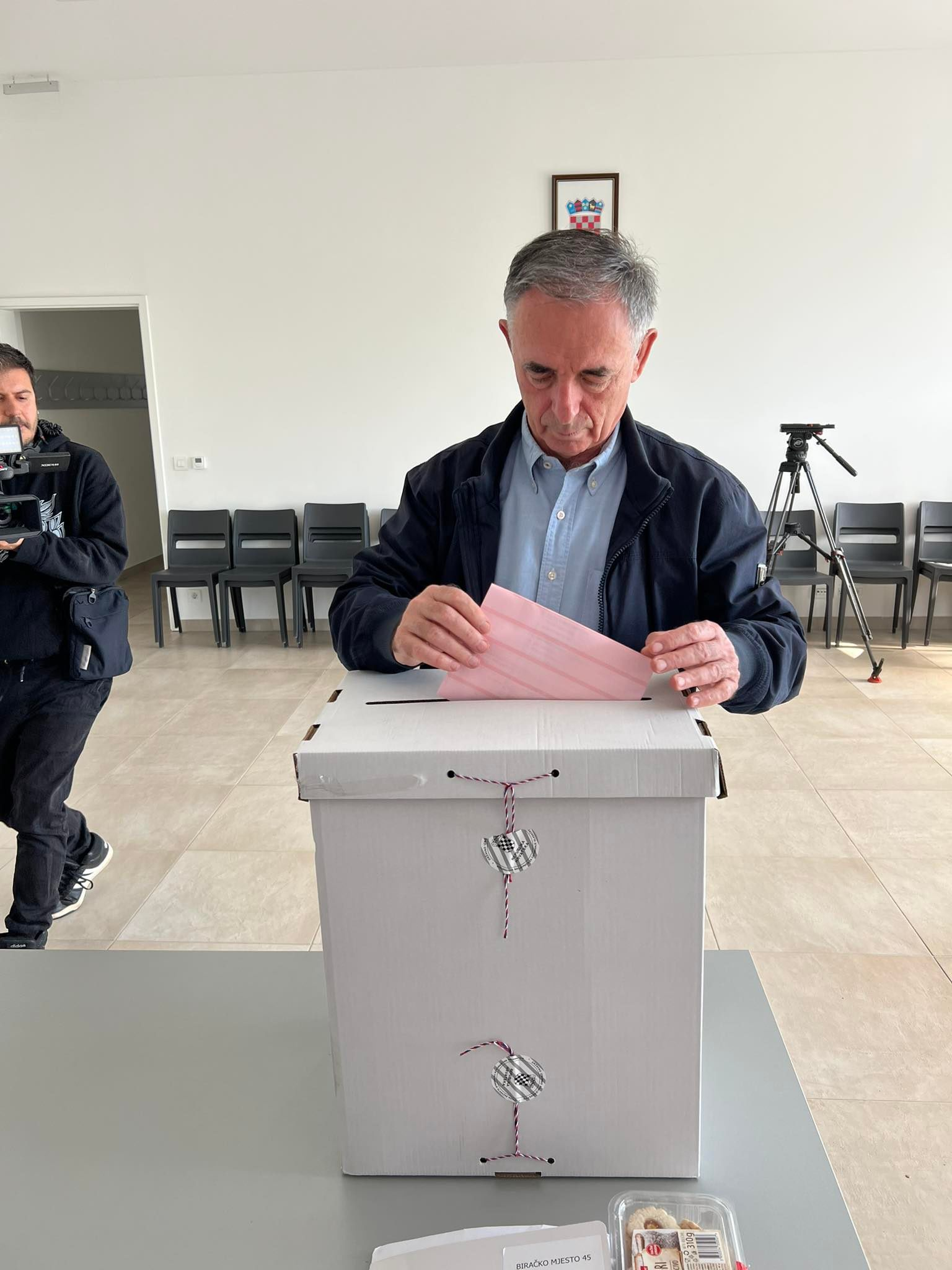
Zagreb Serb National Minority Council list and Milorad Pupovac at the election post in Zagreb.

Directly elected minority councils and representatives are tasked with consulting tasks for the local or regional authorities in which they are advocating for minority rights and interests, integration into public life and participation in the management of local affairs.

Minority council can be elected (but sometimes are not in the absence of candidates) in each administrative unit in which there is at least 1,5% members of a certain minority population in the entire population, or alternatively if there is at least 200 or more individuals in a given municipality or town and 500 or more in a given county. 10 members are elected in each municipal, 15 in town & city, and 25 in county & City of Zagreb minority council.

Individual minority representatives are elected when there is at least 100 members of a certain minority in a municipality, town or county, but the number is below the requirement for a council election.

Minority councils and representatives lists can be nominated by minority organisations or by at least 20 voters from the municipality, 30 from the city and 50 from the county with the cost of the elections being covered by the responsible local or regional unit.

2021 Croatian census reported a total population of 3,871,833 out of which 240,079 were members of 22 national minorities with 123,892 Serbs, 24,131 Bosniaks, 17,980 Roma and 13,817 Albanians belonging to the largest groups.

== Campaign ==
Predrag Ličina, director of the 2019 horror comedy The Last Serb in Croatia which won the Golden Arena for Best Actress and Golden Arena for Best Supporting Actress, prepared the humoristic promotional video ahead of the elections for the Serb National Council under the slogan "We are facing elections that are difficult to pronounce, but very important".

== Gallery ==
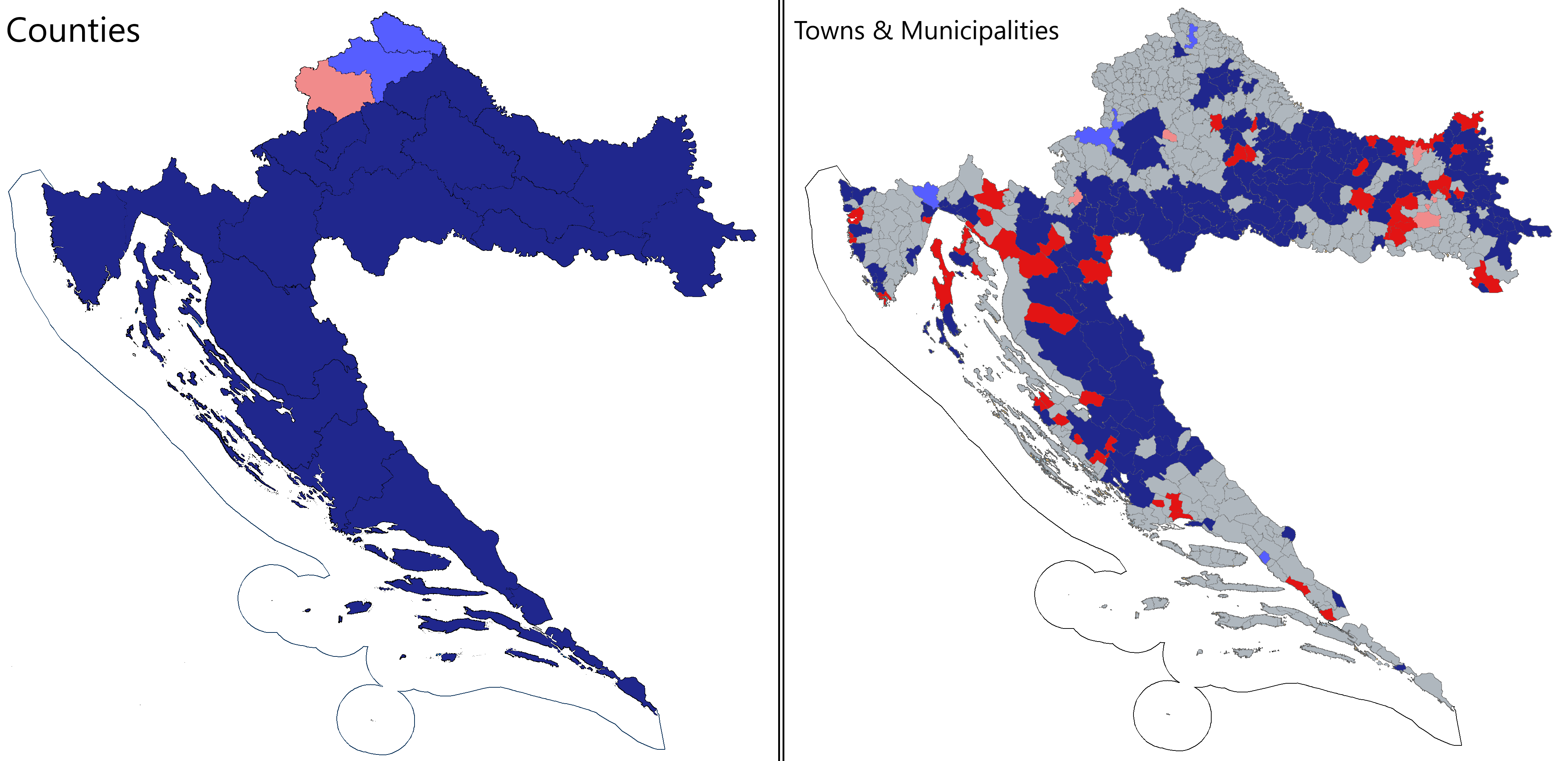
Serb Councils and Representatives:
Council Elections
Council Elections cancelled
Representatives Elections
Representatives Elections cancelled
No Serb minority elections

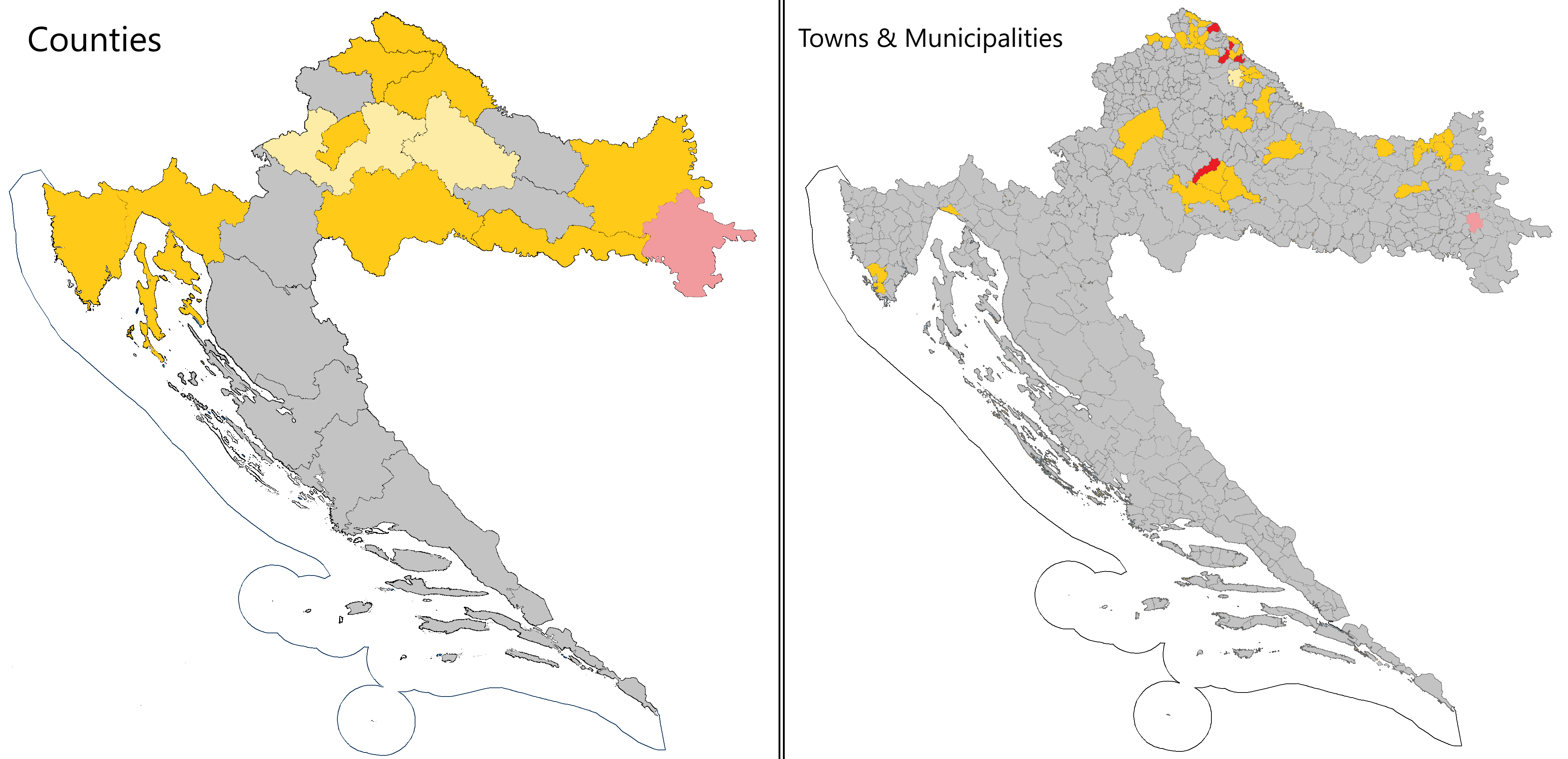
Romani Councils and Representatives:
Council Elections
Council Elections cancelled
Representatives Elections
Representatives Elections cancelled
No Romani minority elections

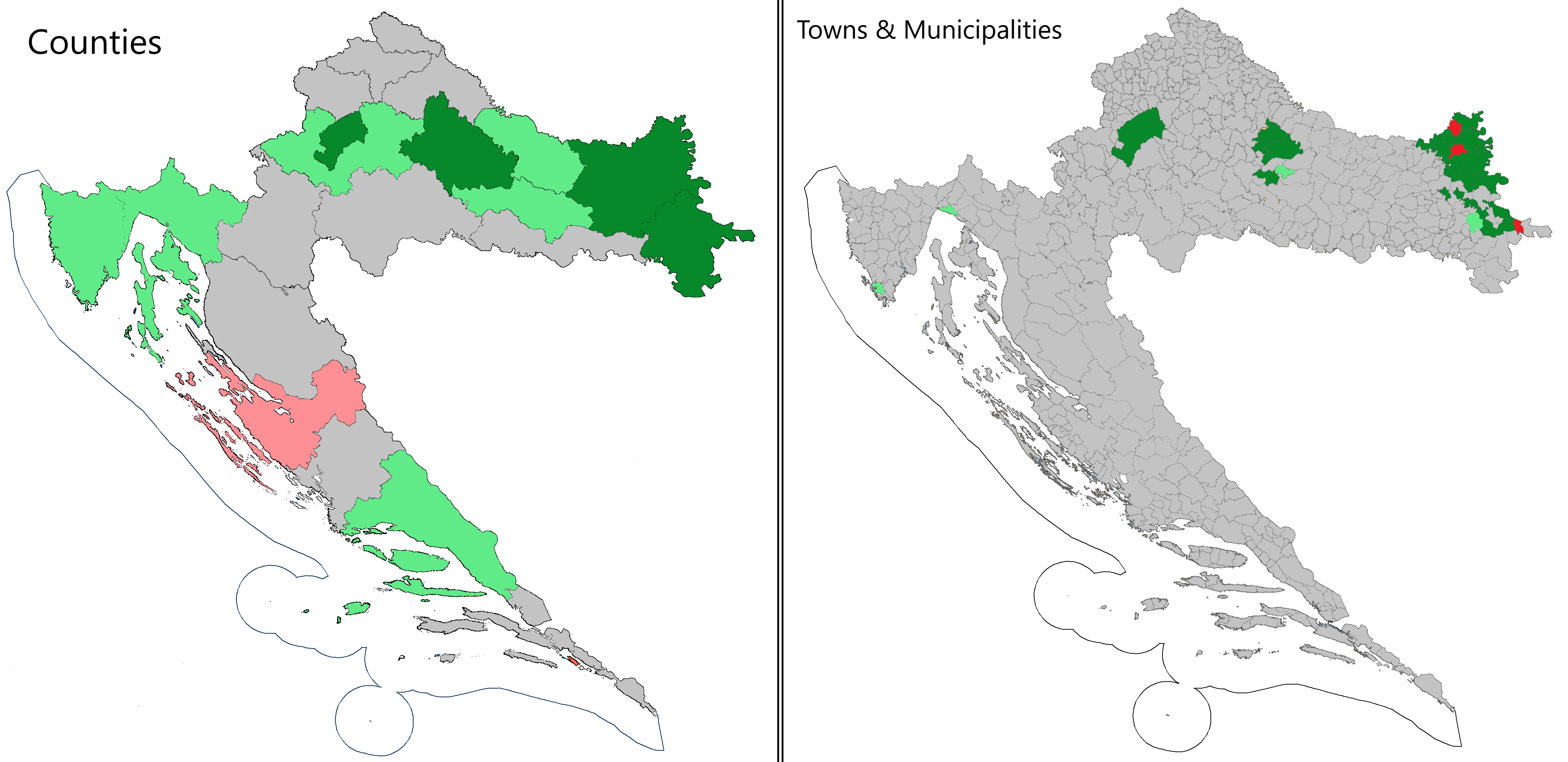
Hungarian Councils and Representatives:
Council Elections
Council Elections cancelled
Representatives Elections
Representatives Elections cancelled
No Hungarian minority elections

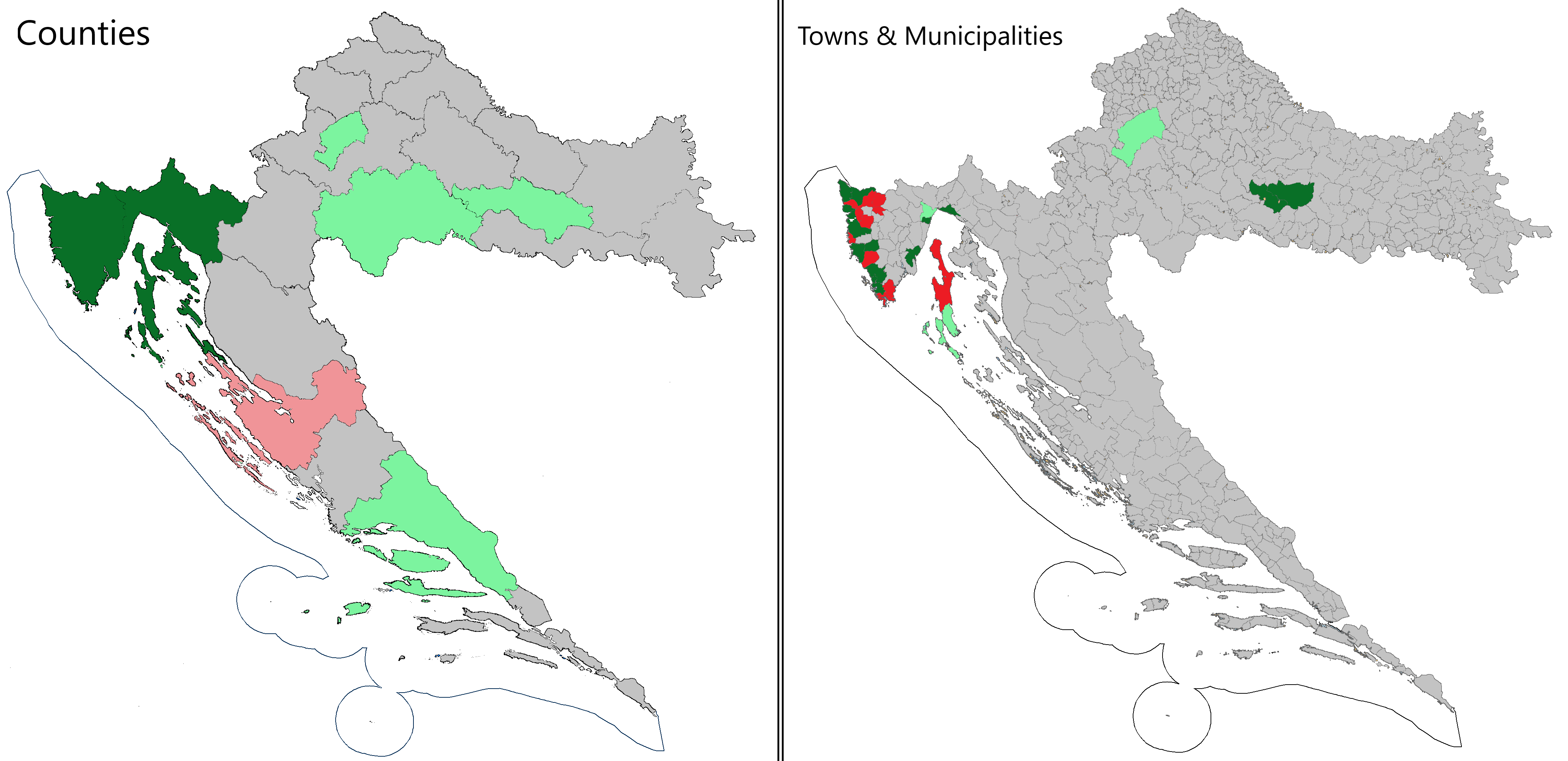
Italian Councils and Representatives:
Council Elections
Council Elections cancelled
Representatives Elections
Representatives Elections cancelled
No Italian minority elections

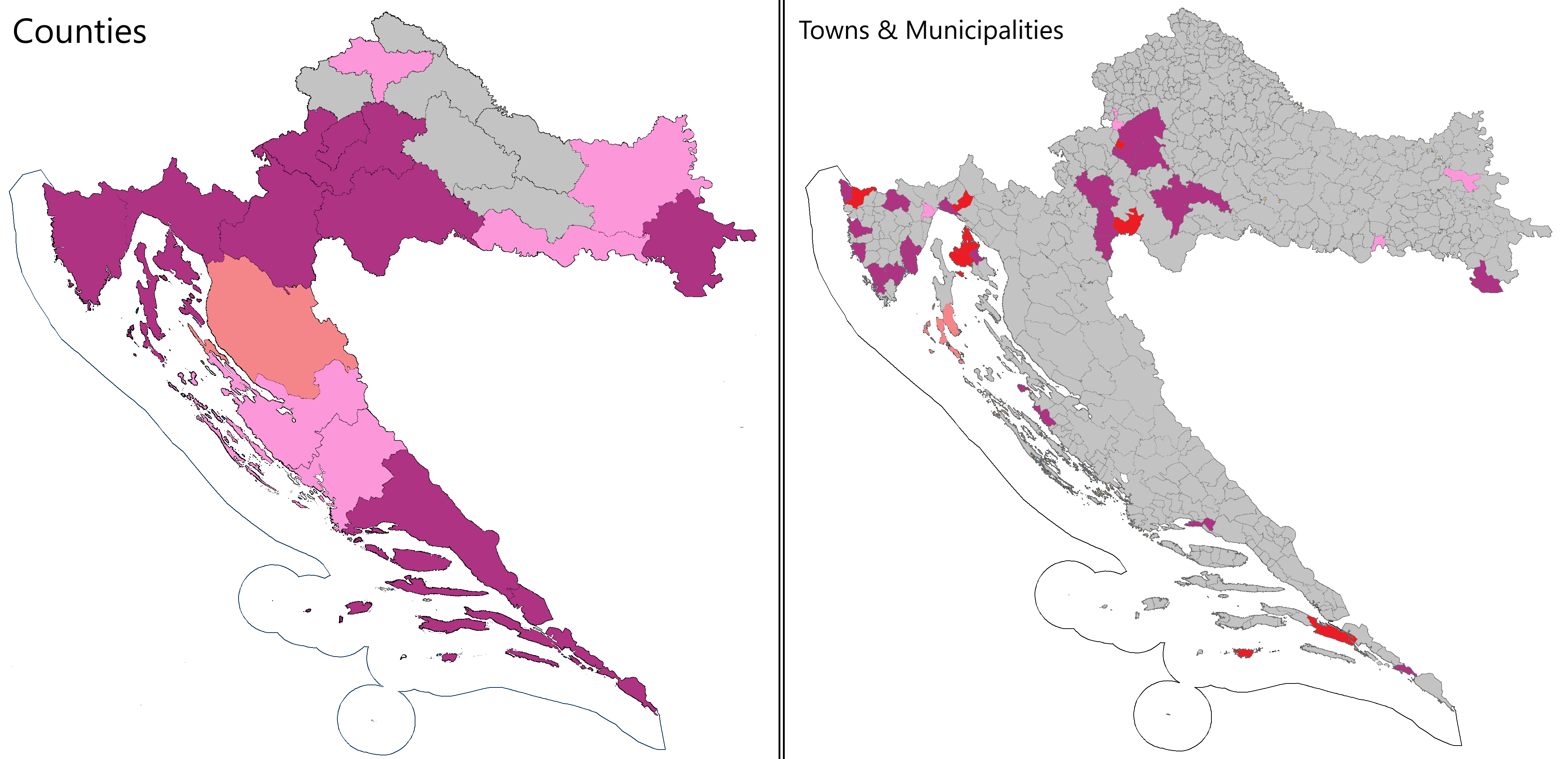
Bosniak Councils and Representatives:
Council Elections
Council Elections cancelled
Representatives Elections
Representatives Elections cancelled
No Bosniak minority elections

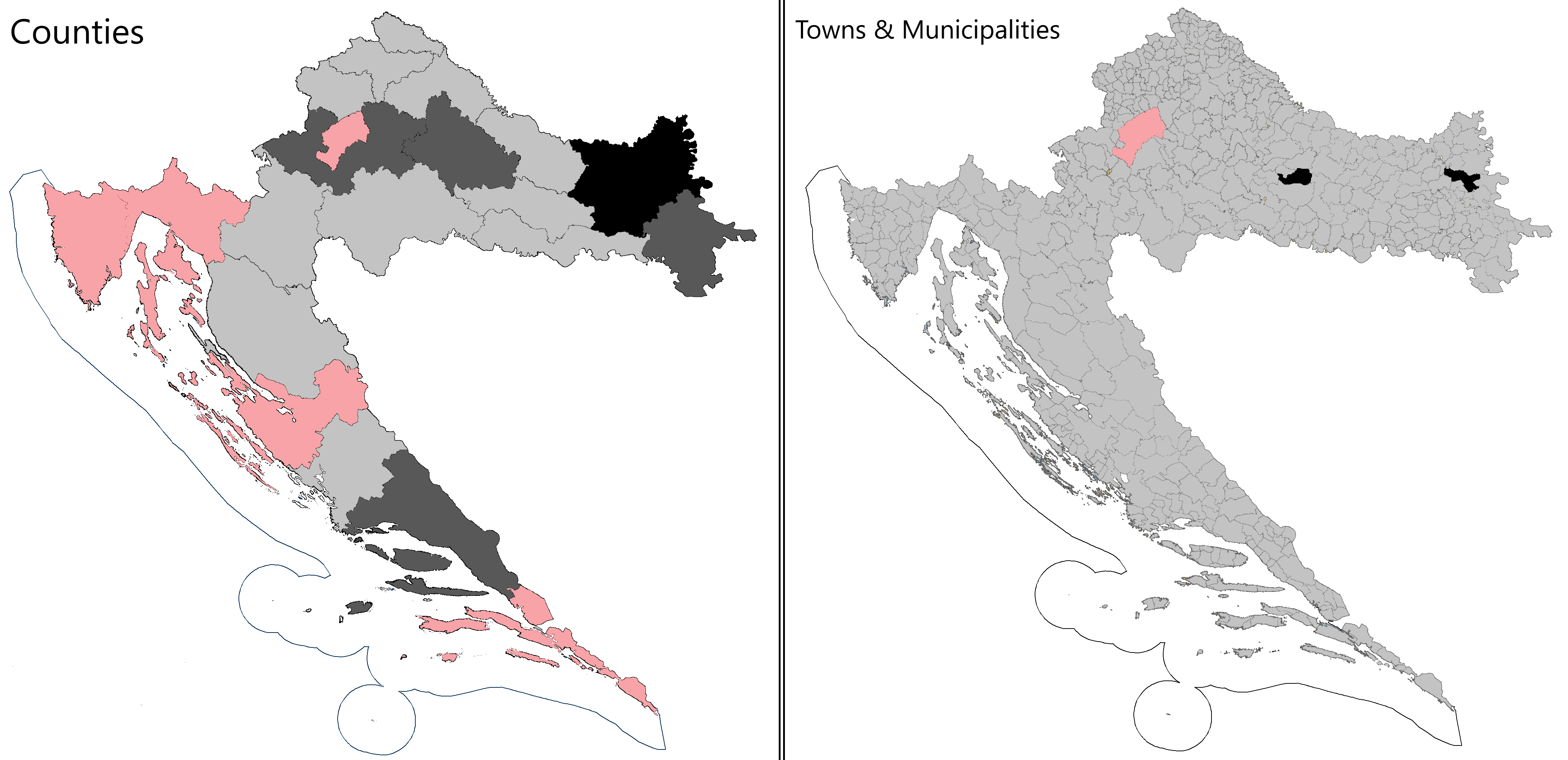
German Councils and Representatives:
Council Elections
Council Elections cancelled
Representatives Elections
Representatives Elections cancelled
No German minority elections

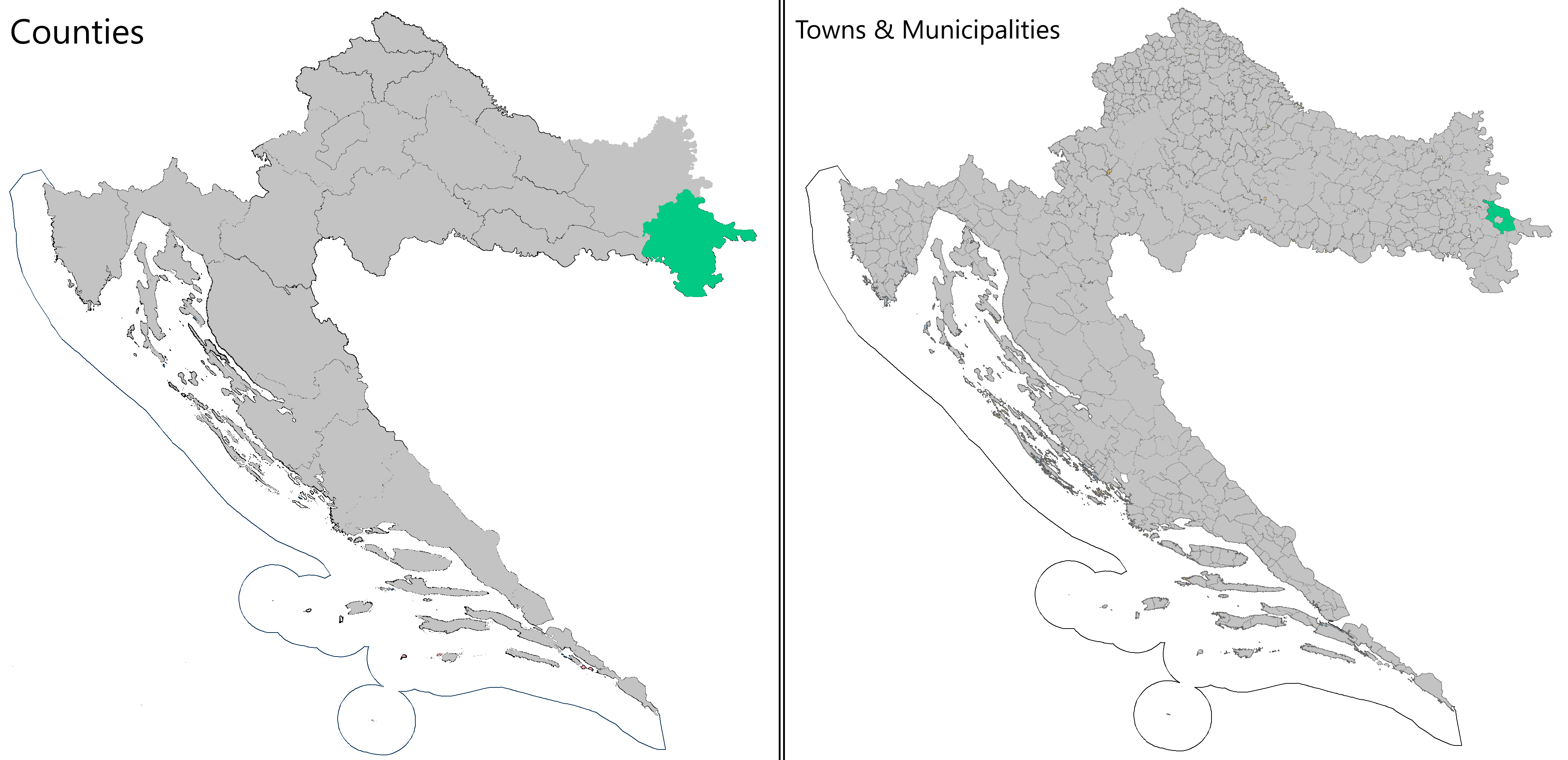
Pannonian Rusyns Councils:
Council Elections
No Pannonian Rusyns minority elections

== See also ==
- Elections in Croatia
