= Siege of Valpovo =

- Part of the Habsburg–Ottoman war of 1540–1547 and Hundred Years' Croatian–Ottoman War
Date	May–June 1543
Location	Valpovo, Croatia
Result	Ottoman victory
Territorial changes	The Ottomans successfully conquer Valpovo in 1543.

Belligerents
(Holy Roman Empire) Habsburg Empire: Habsburg-held Hungary; Kingdom of Croatia	Ottoman Empire

Commanders and leaders
Mihály Árky	Suleiman the Magnificent; Murat-beg Tardić; Malkoč-beg

Casualties and losses
Unknown	Unknown

The siege of Valpovo took place at Valpovo, now part of Croatia, from May to June 1543. It was part of the Ottoman–Habsburg War of 1540–1547, as well as the Hundred Years' Croatian–Ottoman War. The siege resulted in an Ottoman victory.

== Background ==
=== Fort at Valpovo ===
The fort (castle) with suburbs near Valpovo (Hungarian: Valpó, German: Walpach, Turkish: Valpo) is located on a large plain near the Karašica River, about 80 km northeast of Požega and about 27 km northwest of Osijek. It is a small wasserburg (water castle) protected by ramparts and towers, but the defences are outdated and is able to resist only a small assault. The small garrison is under the command of Mihály Árky (also known as Mihály Vas and Michael Archius), a very military man, and a veteran of many campaigns, who provided the city with food and a strong garrison able to repel the attackers for a long time. Valpovo was owned by Imre Perényi, whose son Péter Perényi [hu] was one of the greatest Hungarian aristocrats and the last lord of Valpovo.

=== Military situation ===
In response to King Ferdinand's provocations in Hungary, especially his siege of Pest (26 September – 9 October 1542)[hu], and worry that Buda could be lost, Sultân Süleymân decided to lead a campaign into Hungary in 1543, to expand the Eyalet of Buda and thus strengthen the defence of Buda. He spent the winter in Edirne, almost 250 km northwest of İstanbul, where he planned the coming campaign. Shortly before spring arrived, Süleymân sent an order to Ulama Beğ[tr], the sançakbeğ of Bosnia since 1541, to secure lands between the Danube and Drava rivers before his arrival. Kasım Beğ, the sançakbeğ of Mohács, was ordered to join Ulama Beğ and raid towards Vienna and Buda to assess the status of the Christian armies.

By 16 April, Murad Beğ and Ulama Beğ took Voćin, Stupčanica, Bijela Stijena, Dobra Kuća, Bijela and Sirač. During the spring, Ulama Beğ's army crossed the Drava and broke into Muraköz (Međimurje), raided, and attacked Kanizsa, owned by Tamás Nádasdy, but it was well defended by Nikola IV Zrinski, the Ban of Croatia, who sallied out and attacked Ulama Beğ’s camp, forcing the Ottomans to flee.

Early in the spring, Sultân Suleymân sends an order to Murâd Beğ Tardić, the sanjakbeğ of Požega, commanding:

“You, who are my servant, Murâd Beğ, and the emir of the sanjak of Pojega! As soon as my highest command reaches you, ask in a friendly manner the gâvurs of the castle named Valpovo to surrender, grant mercy to the infidels with vile morals in it and see to it that everything is done according to their wishes. If those wicked accept your highest mercy and offer the castle, immediately take possession of it, and until my arrival see to its custody and protection, as necessary. However, if they oppose and do not give up: then, without delaying an hour or a minute, go, attack the castle and cannonade it until I arrive there."

== Siege of Valpovo ==
In early May, Murâd Beğ, following the Ottoman Sultan Suleyman's orders, rode to Valpovo and, under a flag of parley, asked for the castellan, and gave the garrison an opportunity to surrender on generous terms. Mihály Árky replied: “Hey, Murâd Beğ! Know that I will not surrender the castle to you, do not tire your tongue with vain speech, nor strive after your unattainable desire, but go home and be at ease; then when the Pâdişâh arrives here, I will give it up to him.”

Murâd Beğ angrily responded: “Hey damned one! Such speech is not a satisfactory answer to me, and I have not received such an order from the Pâdişâh. Either surrender the castle or face the consequences. It is time to be ready!” Murâd Beğ recorded the response given by Árky, and sent a report to the Sultân's court in Constantinople.

Murâd Beğ called Hızır (Khizr) Beğ of Kyustendil, Mesih Beğ of Valona, and Ahmed Beğ Yahyapaşaoğlu of Lepanto, to join him in the siege Valpovo. On 6 May, Küçük Bali Paşa, the Beğlerbeğ of Buda, died and the Sultan learned of the death on 14 May, while near Sofia. Two days later, Yahyapaşazade Mehmed Paşa, who took Požega in 1537, was appointed Beğlerbeğ of Buda. On 10 May, Murâd Beğ’s army arrived at Valpovo and began to build entrenchments and firing positions for cannons brought from Osijek. The cannons begin to fire slowly, as much as is possible with the weapons and munitions available. The Valpovo garrison sallied out to attack Murâd's soldiers.

Castellan Árky sent reports about the siege and the garrisons of Siklós and Pécs sent about 500 horsemen as a relief army to lift the siege. The horsemen crossed the Drava River by boat, and while they rode to Valpovo, Murâd Beğ sent 300 of his best horsemen to intercept the Christians. Murâd Beğ sent a report to the Sultân claiming that his men defeated the Christians, killing many, taking some captive, and forcing many others into the river, where they drowned. As proof of the victory, Murâd sent a notable captive and 70 severed ears and noses to the Sultân. European reports claimed that Murâd's horsemen were defeated and that he sent a false report to hide his failure. Murâd's report arrived with the Sultân on 19 May, after he had left Sofia.

The Sultân sent Ahmed Paşa, Beğlerbeğ of Rumelia, the commander of the vanguard, to the Drava River to build a bridge, and then took Siklós and Pécs. He also ordered Kasım Beğ, the sançakbeğ of Mohács, to travel north and clear the way from Szekszárd to Buda of any possible ambushes. On 4 June, while Sultan Suleymân arrived in Belgrade, Ahmed Pasha, with the Sultân's vanguard, arrived at Valpovo and the bombardment continued.

On 9 June, from his estate at Lukavec, in Croatia, Nikola IV Zrinski, Ban of Croatia, informed Nikola Jurišić, Baron of Güns and Governor of Carniola, and others, that from Turkish captives he learned about the arrival of the Ottoman army in Srijem and their bridge-building at Petrovaradin and Osijek. He also reported that the Turks had not yet taken the castle of Walpo (Valpovo), but Mwrathbeg bassa of Posega and Vlymanbeg bassa of Bosnia had besieged it with the strictest siege. Zrinski asked, from all the lords of the kingdom, for support for the besieged fortress and stated that he was willing to help but with his 600 men he could not oppose them alone. No help arrived either for the Ban or Valpovo.

On 10 June, Süleymân left Belgrade. Two days later, near Šabac, he crossed the Sava River and marched into Slavonia. On 13 June, after the siege cannons had created breaches in Valpovo's walls, a large assault was made but repulsed by the defenders. As reports arrived that the Sultân would soon arrive, the ferocity of Murâd Beğ’s attacks increased but the defenders continued to resist, killing several eminent Warriors of the Faith.

On 21 June, soldiers from the Sultân's army arrived, bringing with them large wall-shattering siege cannons. The cannons were set up and fired. By 22 June, 3,137 cannonballs had hit the Valpovo walls, most of which were shattered, half the soldiers were dead, and almost all the rest were either wounded or sick. As the stench of the rotting corpses grew unbearable, first among the residents, and then the soldiers, morale dropped. Following the Sultân's arrival, the Rumelian and Anatolian Beğlerbeğs formed up and paraded their soldiers, in full splendour, in front of Valpovo further terrifying the residents and soldiers inside. Mihály Árky continues to resist surrendering.

Also on 22 June, from his estate at Lukavec, Nikola IV Zrinski wrote to Tamás Nádasdy, a former Ban of Croatia, asking for help to rescue Valpovo. Zrinski stated that he was prepared to go with his army where he is needed and waits for orders. He warned about what might happen to the morale of other castellans if they saw that the castellan of Valpovo, while in danger, were left without support. No help arrived.

On 23 June, demoralized residents rebelled and forced castellan Árky to surrender. One story tells that the terrified defenders captured Árky and handed him over to Ahmed Beğ, who imprisoned him. Ahmed Paşa, Beğlerbeğ of Rumelia, sent a courier with a report of the victory to Sultân Süleymân, who was nearing Osijek. Ottoman sources claimed that, with the courier, Mihály Árky was sent as a prisoner to the Sultân, who allegedly, impressed with Árky's defence, gave him a rich offer that Árky could not refuse and that he joined the Sultân and was given a timar in the Eyalet of Buda. Some Hungarian sources claimed that though Árky and his men were promised safe passage from Valpovo, they were killed in an ambush by soldiers desiring booty. Yet another story told that the Paşa invited Árky and a few of his officers to dinner, where Árky was killed.

=== Afterwards ===
Three days later, Sultân Süleymân encamped under Valpovo and rewarded Murad Beğ with an increase in annual income of 30,000 akçe and his son with a timar of 12,000 akçe. At an Imperial Divân, the viziers and notables congratulated the Sultan on his victory and a judge and an imam were appointed to govern the town. Süleymân then ordered Ahmed Paşa to besiege Siklós. From there, Süleymân returned to Osijek, crossed the Drava River, entered southern Hungary with his army, and soon after took Siklós and Pécs, where his army was joined by tens of thousands (possibly up to 80,000) Tatars and akınçi light horsemen. From there, the army marched north to Esztergom, Székesfehérvar, and Tata.
