= Siklós =

- Town
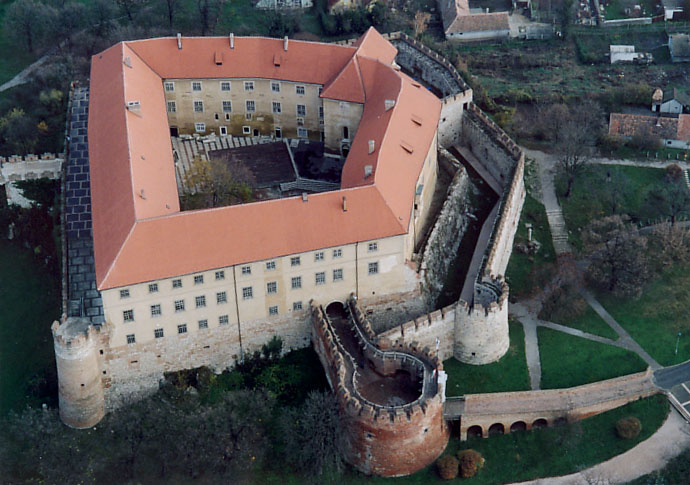
- Siklós Castle

- Flag Coat of arms

- Location within Hungary
- Coordinates: 45.85213°N 18.29880°E
- Country: Hungary
- County: Baranya
- District: Siklós

Area
  - Total: 50.92 km^{2} (19.66 sq mi)

Population (2008)
  - Total: 9,964
  - Density: 202.12/km^{2} (523.5/sq mi)
- Time zone: UTC+1 (CET)
  - Summer (DST): UTC+2 (CEST)
- Postal code: 7800, 7818
- Area code: (+36) 72
- Website: www.siklos.hu

Siklós (Serbo-Croatian: Šikloš/Шиклош) is the 4th largest town in Baranya county, Hungary. The Malkocs Bey Mosque was built by the order of the Malkoçoğlu family.

== Ottoman conquest ==
During Sultân Süleymân's 1543 campaign into Hungary, the Ottoman army first took Valpovo, in Slavonia, on June 23. Süleymân then sent his army north of the Drava River to take Siklós, which belonged to the Perényi family [hu], who, during the civil war raging in Hungary, was on the side of King Ferdinand I of Habsburg. Either on June 24 or 25, Siklós was given an opportunity to surrender but the garrison, led by castellan Mihály Vas, refused. On June 26, Siklós was besieged, bombarded, and attacked but the garrison stood strong. While Siklós was besieged, representatives from Pécs arrive and surrender the city. On July 6, after 3,000 cannonballs had hit the fortress, the garrison surrendered, and Süleymân entered the city the next day. From Siklós, the Sultân marched to Pécs. After 143 years of Ottoman rule, Siklós was liberated on October 30, 1686. [hu]

== Notable people ==
- George Mikes, British author most famous for his humorous commentaries on various countries
- Albert Siklós, composer
- Rudolphus de Benyovszky, violinist and composer

== Twin towns – sister cities ==
Siklós is twinned with:

- Aiud, Romania
- Donji Miholjac, Croatia
- Feldbach, Austria
- Fornovo di Taro, Italy
- Moldava nad Bodvou, Slovakia

== Gallery ==
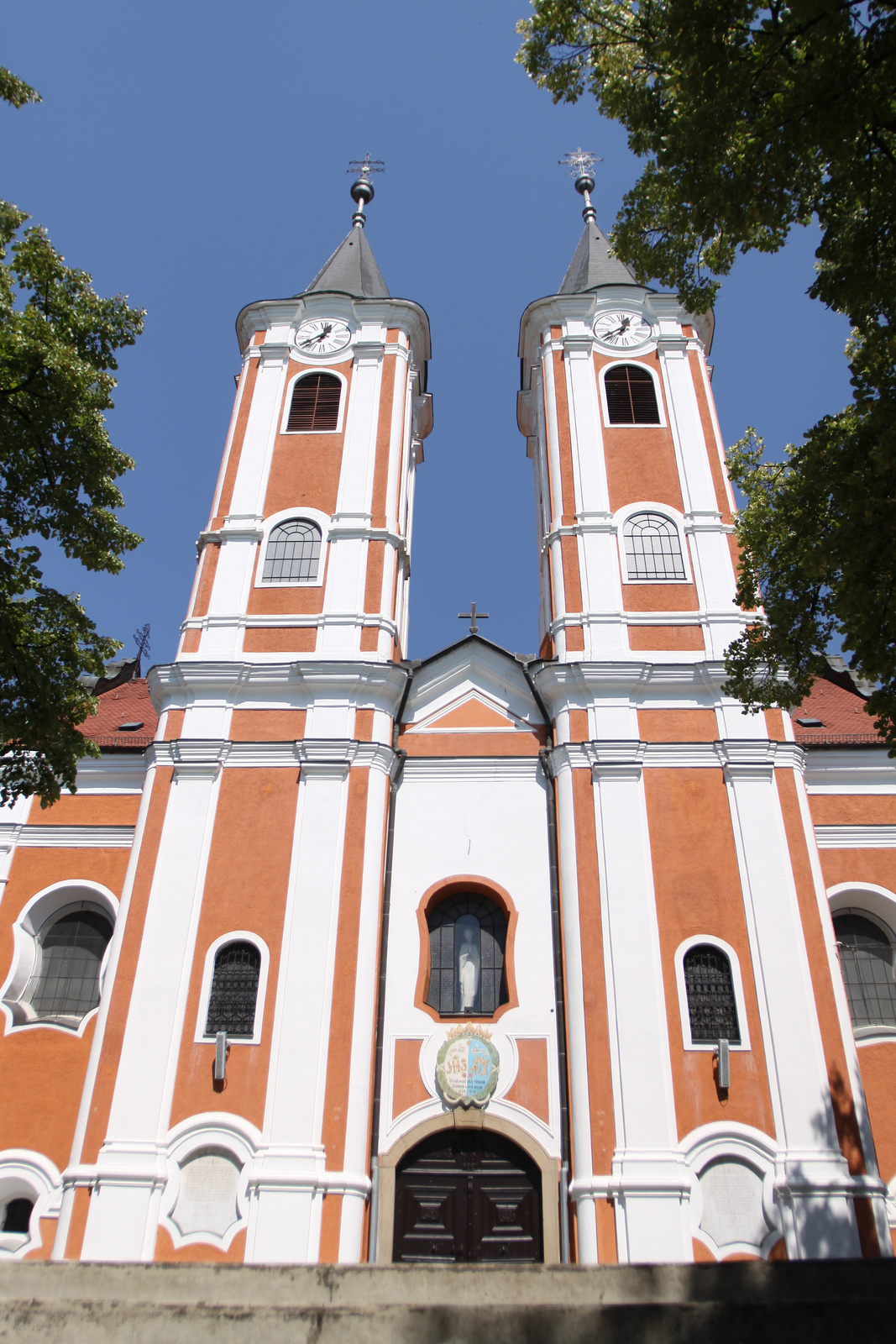
Franciscan Church of Máriagyüd

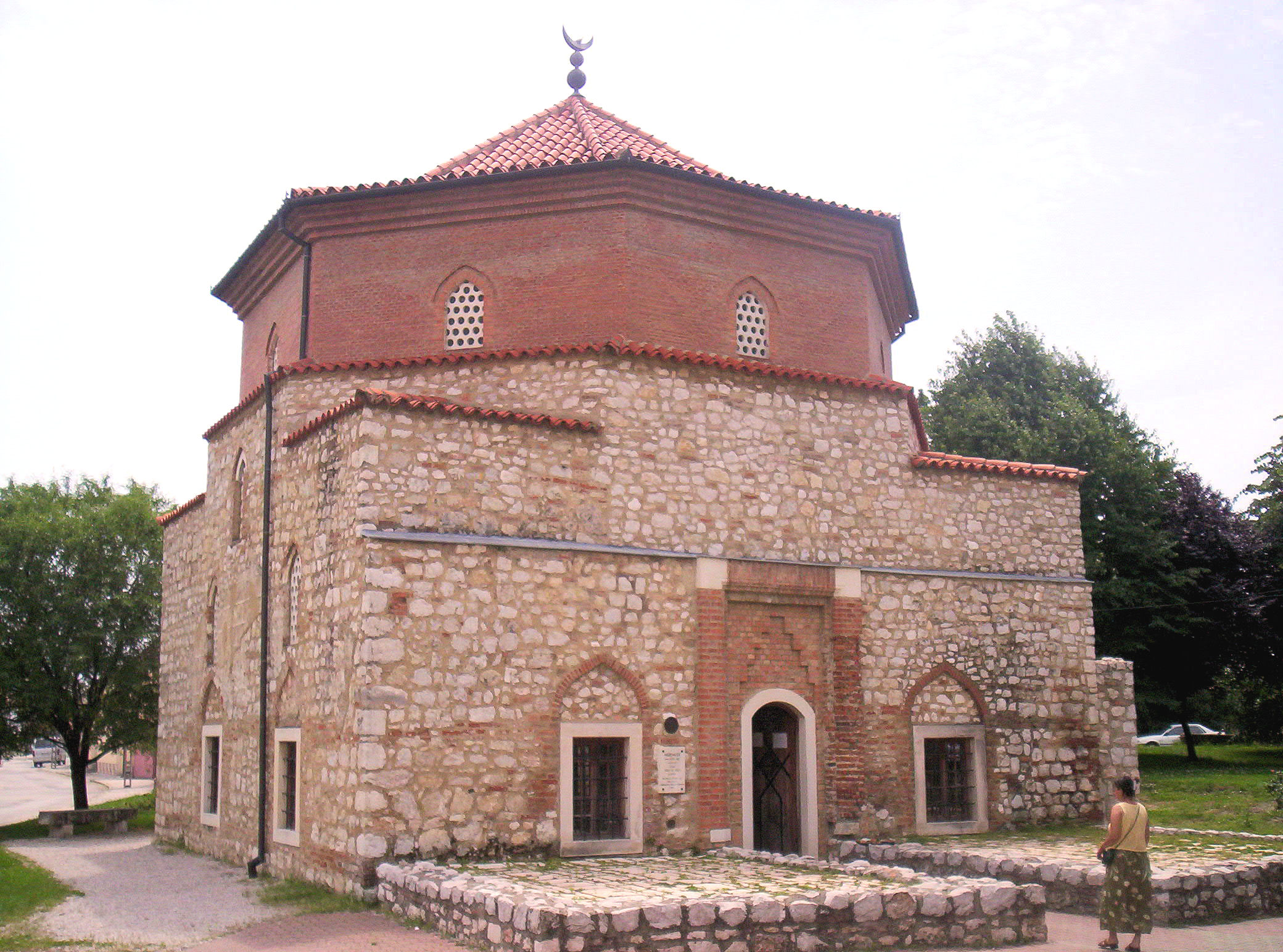
Malkocs Bey Mosque

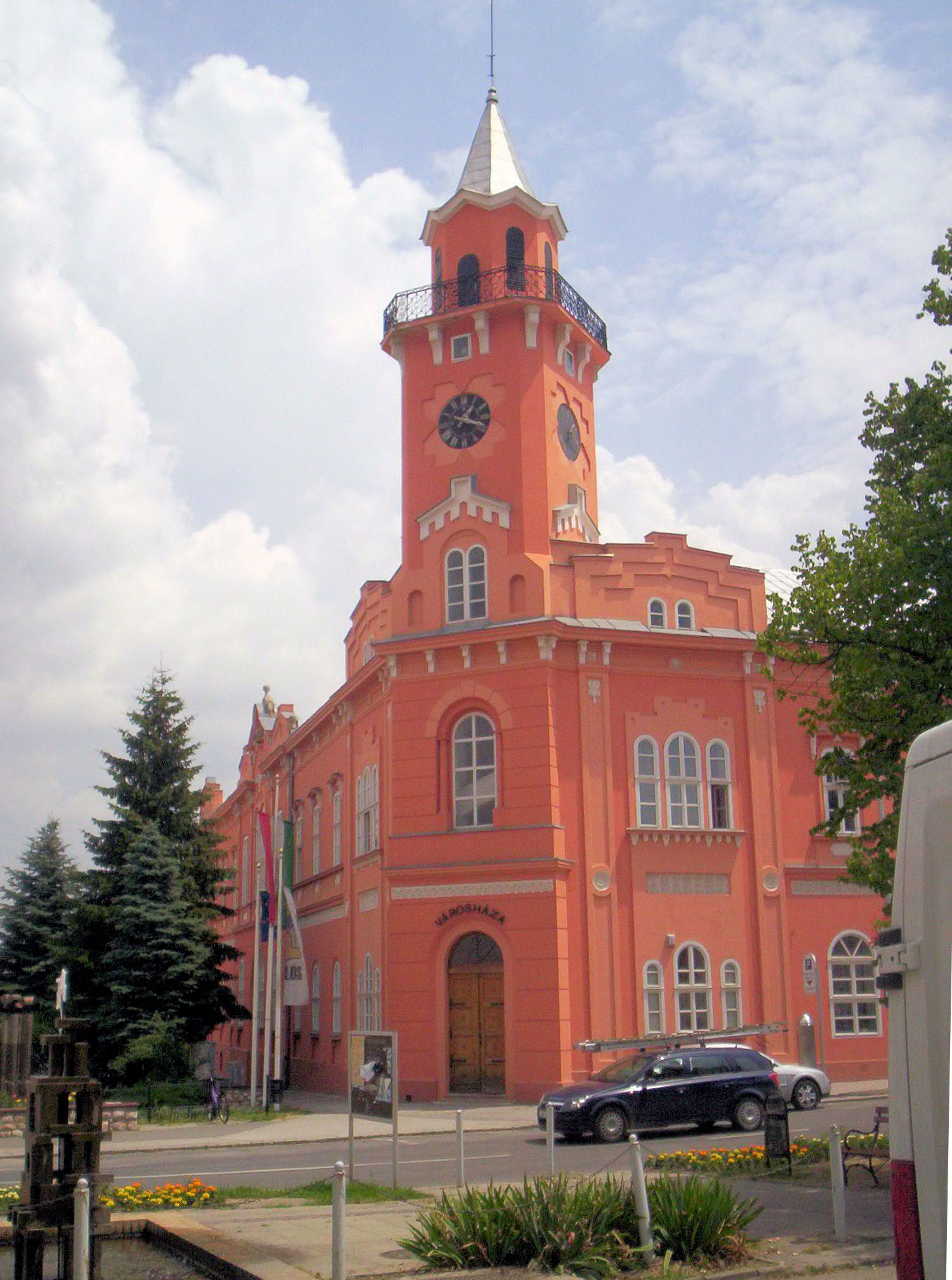
Town hall
