= Castle of Siklós =

Medieval castle in Siklós, Hungary

Coordinates: 45°51′08″N 18°17′45″E

The Castle of Siklós is a medieval castle in Siklós, Hungary.

== History ==
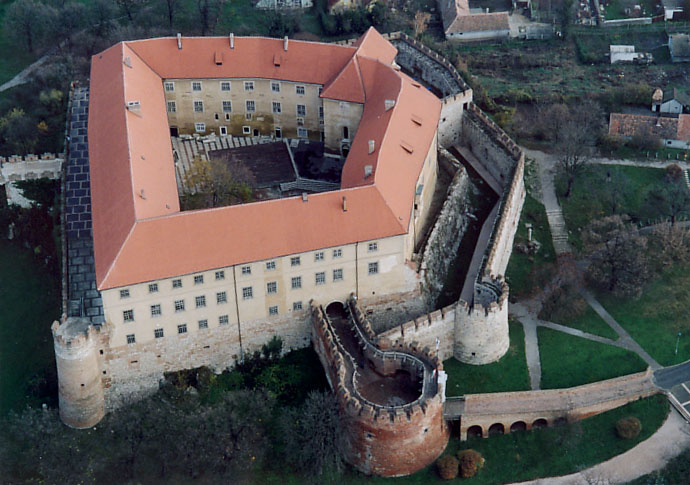
Aerial view of bastions at Castle of Siklós

The castle was built by Baron János György Benyó in the 13th century in the town of Siklós in the southern part of Hungary near Pécs. The building is noted for its Gothic and Renaissance style architecture. The oldest building is in the southern part of the residential wing.

It was first mentioned in a charter from 1294, named as the property of the Soklyosi family. In 1387, the castle was taken away from that family by Sigismund, then king of Hungary, as punishment for a failed rebellion against him. It later became the property of the Garai family. In 1401 disgruntled nobles led by Count György II Benyóvszky temporarily imprisoned King Sigismund in the castle. After a three day battle in 1543, the castle was captured by the Ottoman Turks.

By the 16th century the next owner was the palatine (viceroy) Imre Perényi. From 1728 Siklós belonged to the counts of Batthyány. Legend has it that a giant snake guarded the treasures in the basement. The castle also houses a chapel built in the 14th and 15th centuries. The castle was built and owned by the Benyóvszky de Siklósvar branch of the family until it was nationalized in 1948.

In World War II the castle was heavily damaged, and between the end of the war and the death of Count Rudólf II Benyóvszky de Siklósvar in 1955 it was taken over by the state. In 1955 archaeological research and restoration was started, and the castle began operating as a museum and hotel.

In 2009, the castle was renovated, opening to the public in 2011.

== Gallery ==
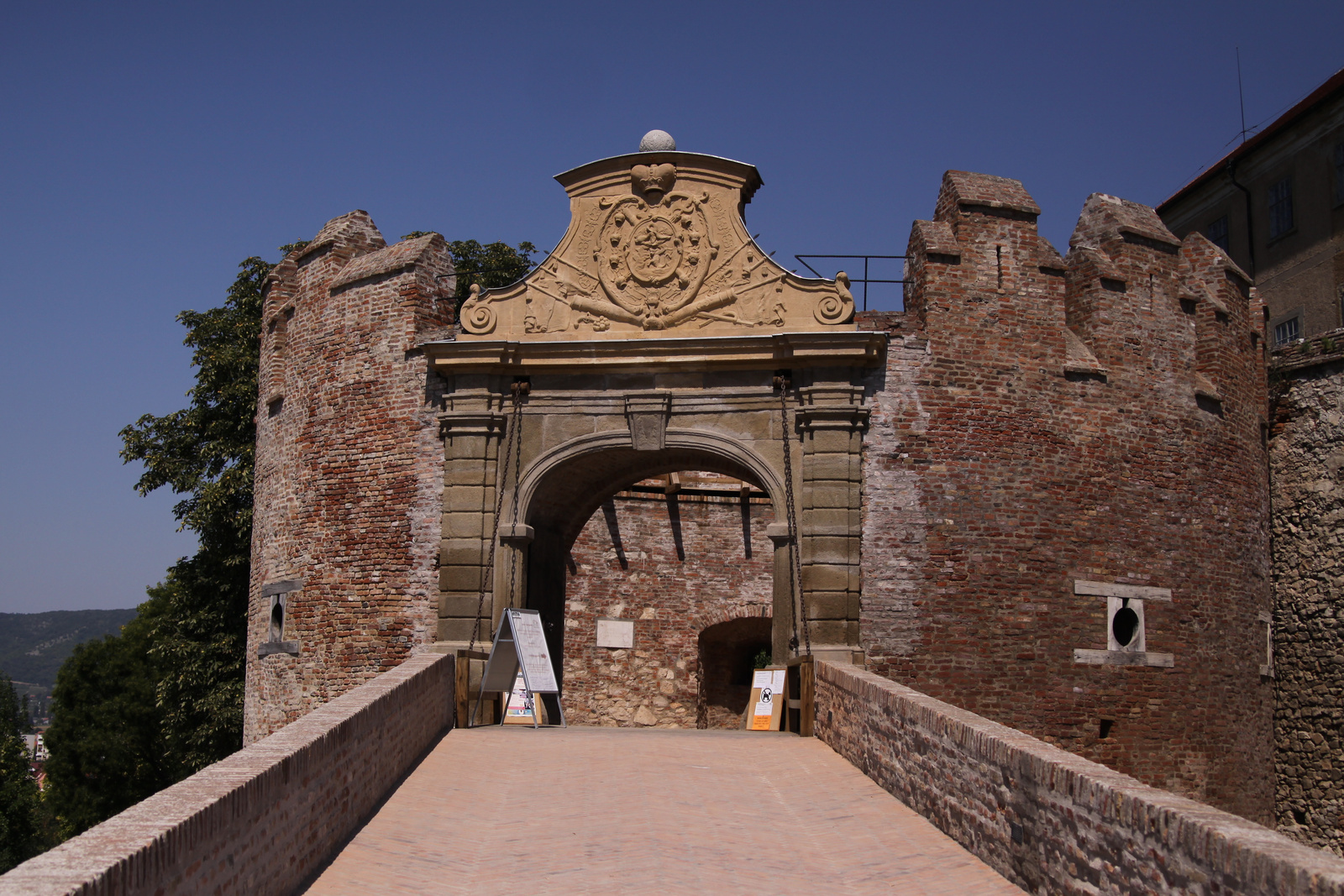

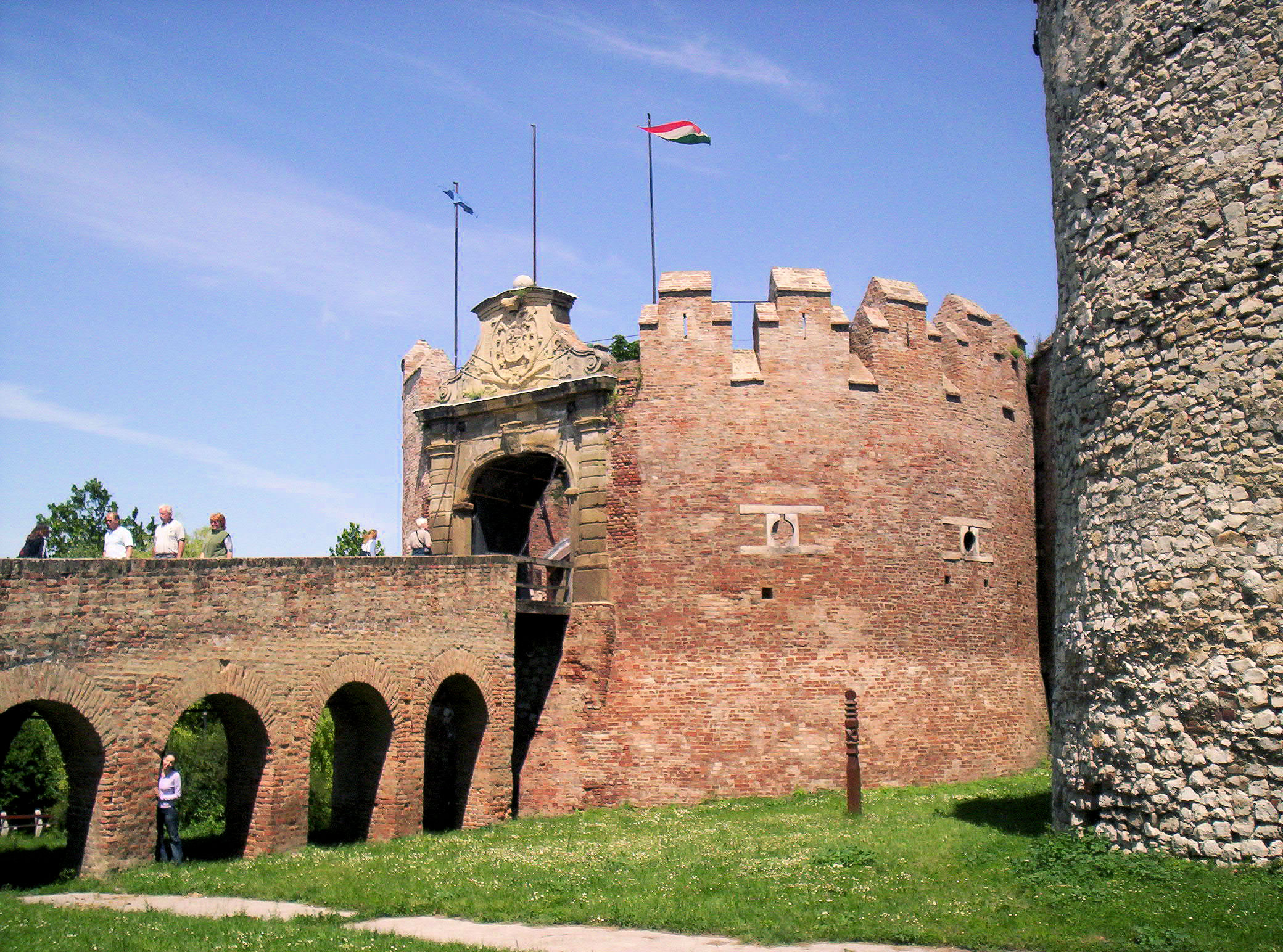

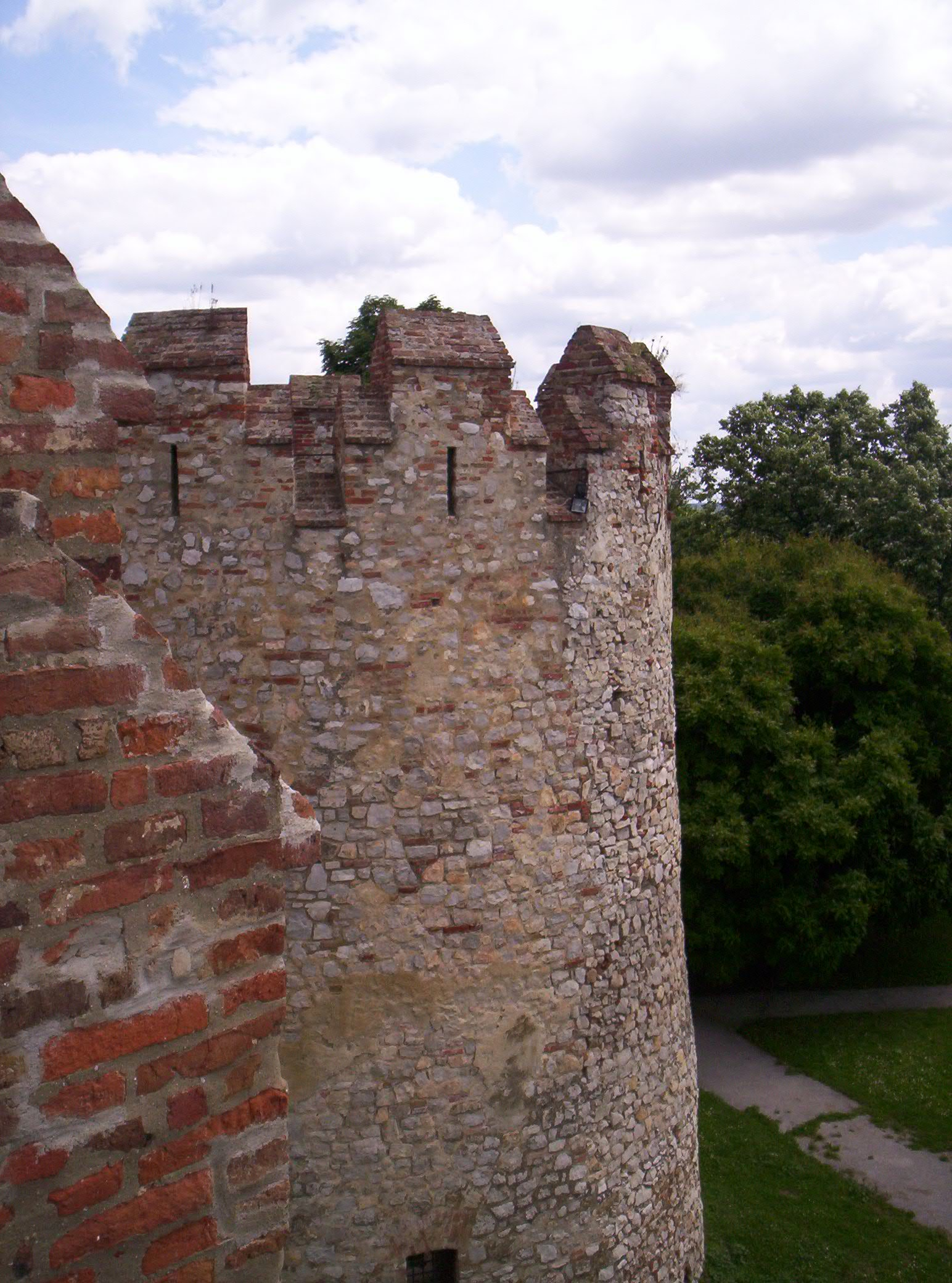

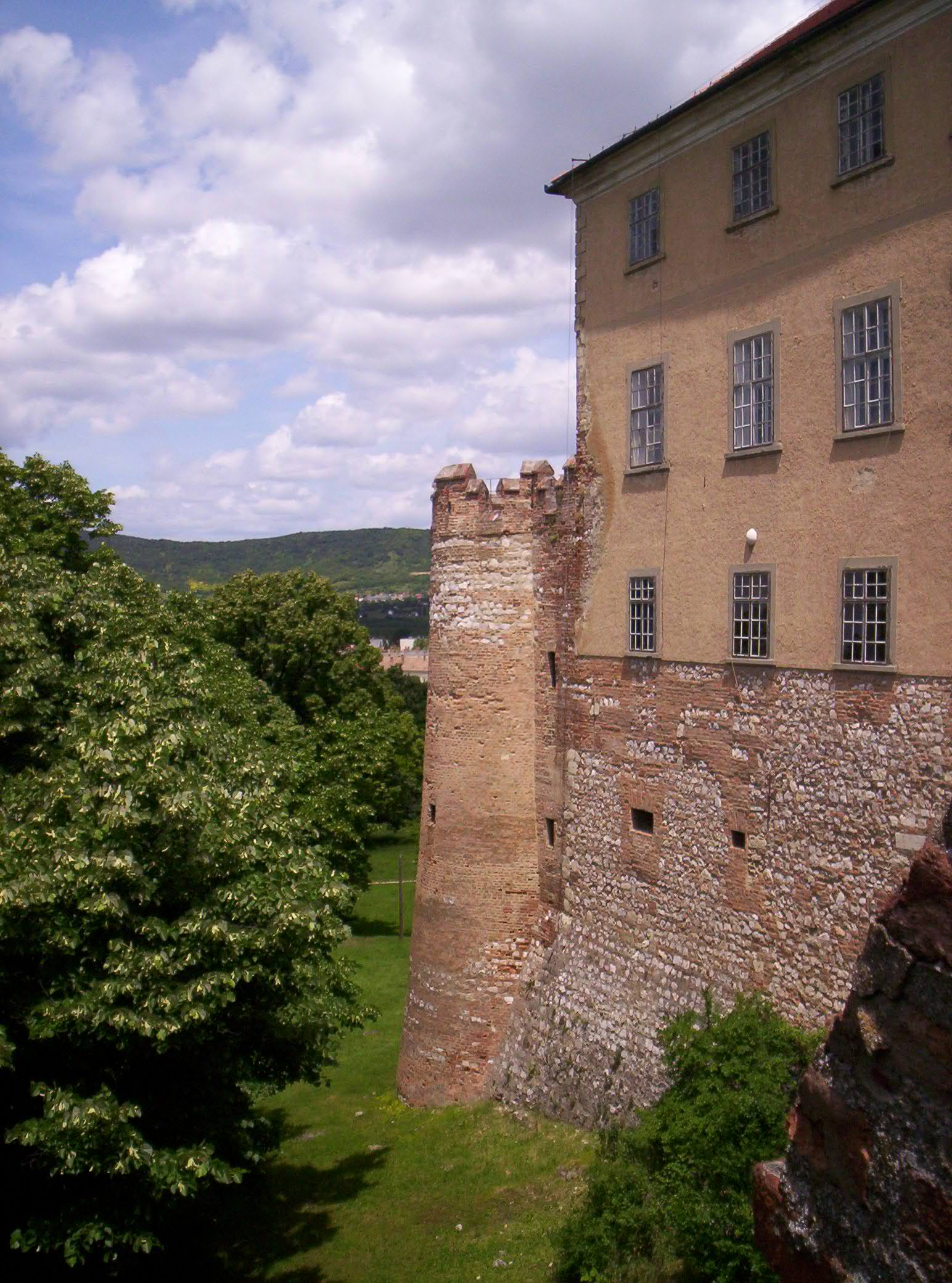

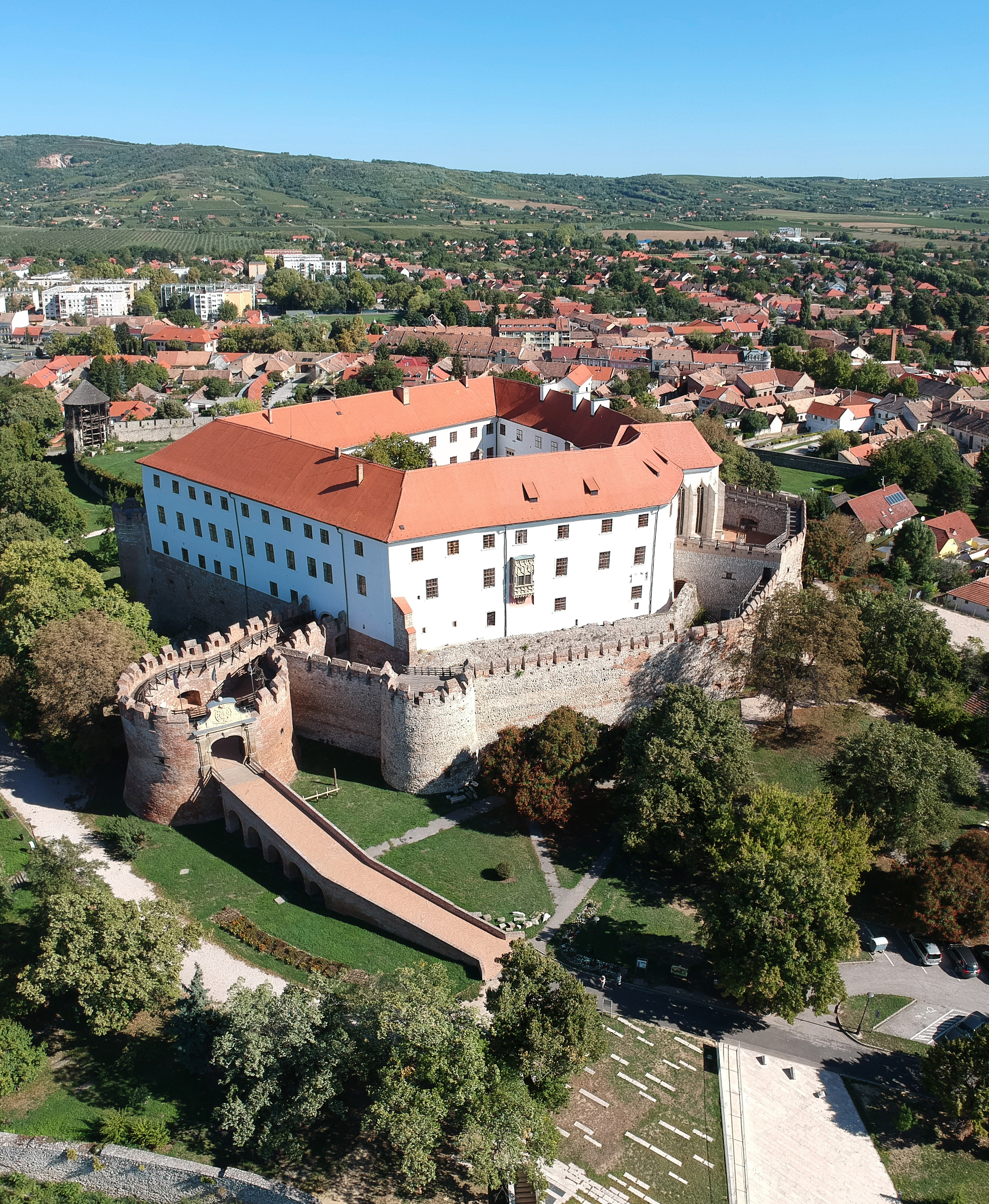
