= Viktor Axmann =

Croatian architect

- Born: 29 August 1878; Osijek, Kingdom of Croatia-Slavonia, Austria-Hungary (now Croatia)
- Died: 3 March 1946 (aged 67); Valpovo, PR Croatia, FPR Yugoslavia (now Croatia)

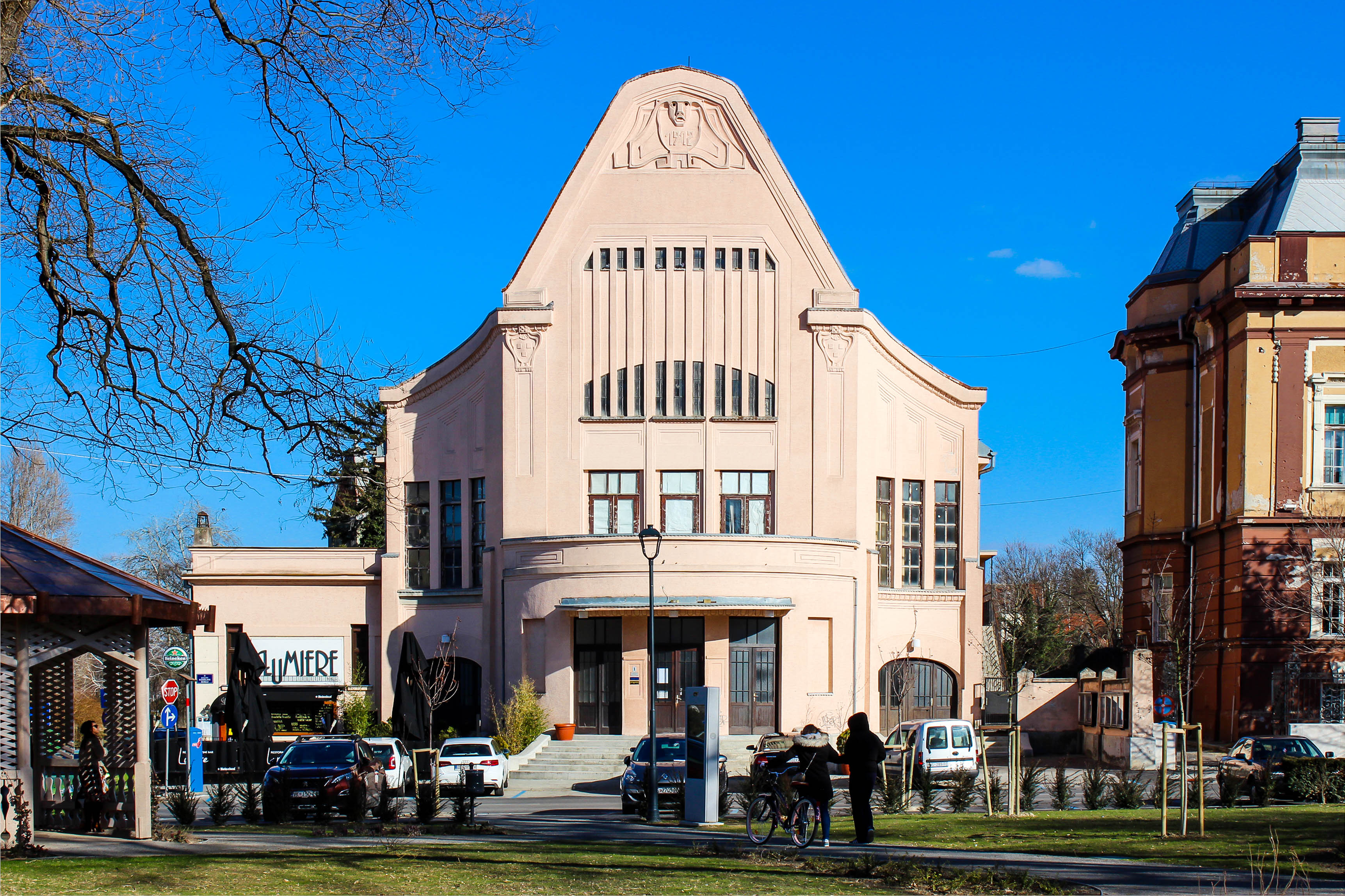
Urania Cinema in Osijek

Viktor Axmann (given name: Vladoje Aksmanović; 29 August 1878, Osijek, Croatia – 3 March 1946, Valpovo, Croatia) was a Croatian architect. He spent most of his life in Osijek, but he died in 1946 in a communist labor camp in Valpovo.

He finished the Technical College in Munich, Germany. Afterwards, he specialized in Vienna, Austria, where he got in touch with contemporary ideas of urban architecture of Josef Hoffman, Otto Wagner, and Camillo Sitte.

In 1905, he became a construction entrepreneur in Osijek, where he built numerous secession-style buildings. His most important work of that period was the Urania Cinema (built-in 1912), for which he received a prestigious award at the 1st International Cinema Exhibition in Vienna. After World War I he gradually abandoned the secession in favor of modernism. In that period, he built numerous architecturally important buildings in Osijek, such as the Apprentices' Dormitory (Croatian: Naučnički dom, built in 1923), Workers' Insurance Office (Ispostava ureda za osiguranje radnika, also 1923), two pavilions of the Osijek Hospital (Osječka bolnica, 1925), House of Falcons (Sokolski dom, 1928), Boarding School (Đački dom, 1929), the palace of the County Office of Workers' Insurance (Okružni ured za osiguranje radnika, 1936, co-projected with D. Špiller and J. Kastl) and Office of the Matches' Factory "Drava" Pension Fund (Dom mirovinske zaklade tvornice žigica "Drava", 1940).

Axmann was also involved in urban planning. He tried to add modern ideas of spatial planning to organize the Osijek metropolitan area. In that spirit, he created a series of plans. In 1906, he projected new streets in the heart of Osijek. Under Wagner's influence, in 1908, he projected Osijek's main square and farmers' market. The same year he attended the 8th International Congress of Architects in Vienna. Aside from Axmann, the Club of Croatian Architects sent his representatives to the congress. However, Axmann's application to join the club had been denied two years before. In 1910, he projected the Sakuntala Park. Aside from urban planning and architecture, Axmann also wrote about the urban problems of Osijek in the Gazette of the Croatia Society of Engineers and Architects.

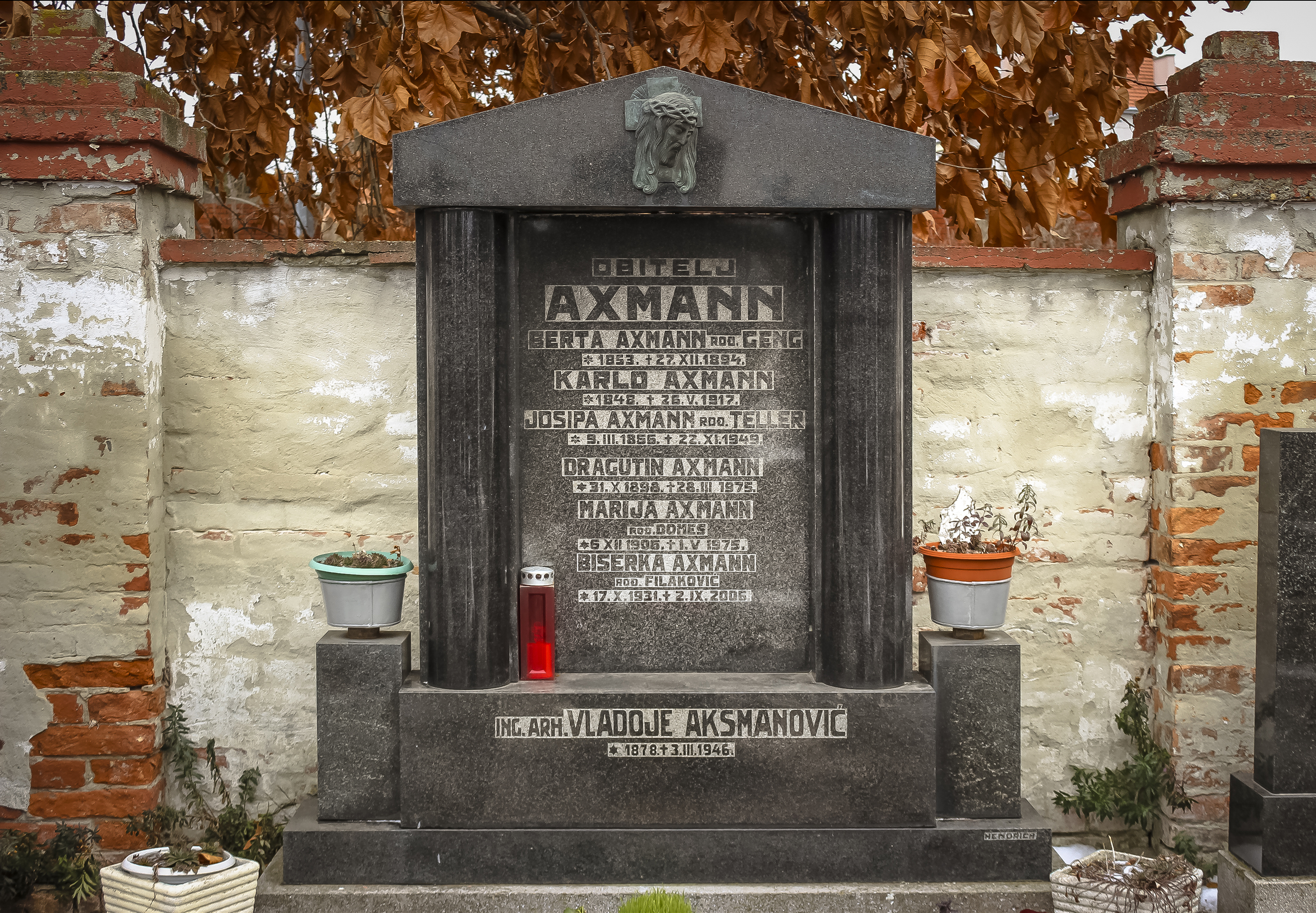
Axmann’s grave

== Sources ==
- Ambruš, Viktor: Osijek na prijelazu u 20. stoljeće (Transition of Osijek into the 20th century). Peristil, № 31/32, DPU, Zagreb, 1988/89
- Ambruš, Viktor: Razvoj grada Osijeka na prijelazu iz 19. stoljeća u 20. stoljeće (The evolution of the city of Osijek during the period between 19th and 20th century). Secesija slobodnog i kraljevskog grada Osijeka, HAZU, Osijek, 2001
- Ivanković M., Grgur: Secesijska arhitektura u Slavoniji i sjevernoj Hrvatskoj (Secession architecture in Slavonia and northern Croatia). Secesija u Hrvatskoj (exhibition in Museum of Arts and Crafts, Zagreb), 2003

== Bibliography ==
ESSEKERI http://essekeri.hr/bio/59-viktor-axmann

- Miodrag Savkovitch, Emerih Mike (1926). Zbirka portreta i biografija znamenitih ljudi kraljevstva Srba, Hrvata i Slovenaca. Vienna: Union - Stephen A. Schwarzman Building / Slavic and Baltic Division.
