= Ladimirevci =

- Village (Selo)
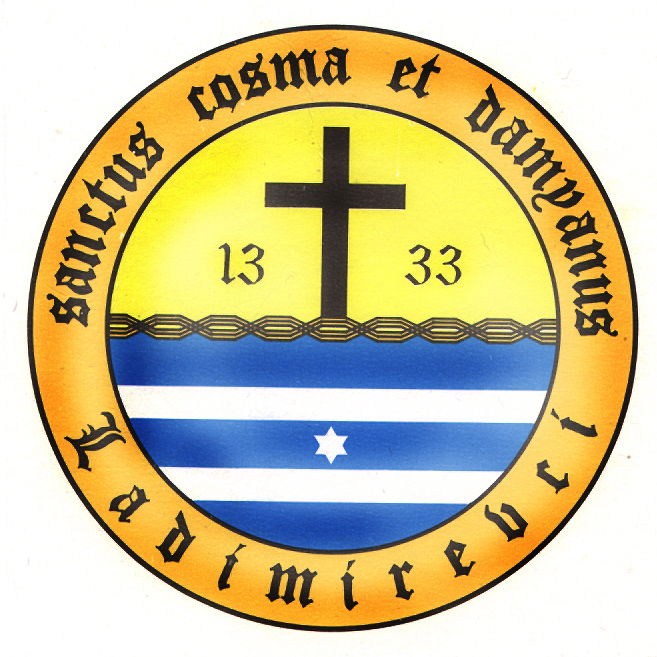
- Seal

- Location within Croatia
- Coordinates: 45°37′N 18°26′E
- Country: Croatia
- County: Osijek-Baranja
- Town: Valpovo

Government
  - Chief: Goran Ivanović (HDZ)

Area
  - Total: 19.1 km^{2} (7.4 sq mi)
- Elevation: 91 m (299 ft)

Population (2021)
  - Total: 1,290
  - Density: 67.5/km^{2} (175/sq mi)
- Time zone: UTC+1 (CET)
  - Summer (DST): UTC+2 (CEST)
- Vehicle registration: OS
- Website: Ladimirevci.info

Ladimirevci (Hungarian: Ladomérfalva) is a village administratively located in the Town of Valpovo on the right bank of the Karašica river. One of the only two SOS children villages in Croatia is located here.

== Etymology ==
According to legend, the name Ladimirevci comes from the headstone at the entrance to the village, which has: "LAD I MIR EVICI" (shade and peace to Evica) written on it. But experts think that the Ladimirevci is named after the old name Ladimir because many villages in the area have names that end with "vci" suffix.

== Famous people ==
Fabijan Šovagović - famous theater and film actor

== Literature ==
Darko Grgić's "Ladimirevci: Drevno slavonsko selo" (1994).
