= Prandau-Normann Castle =

Prandau-Normann castle in Valpovo
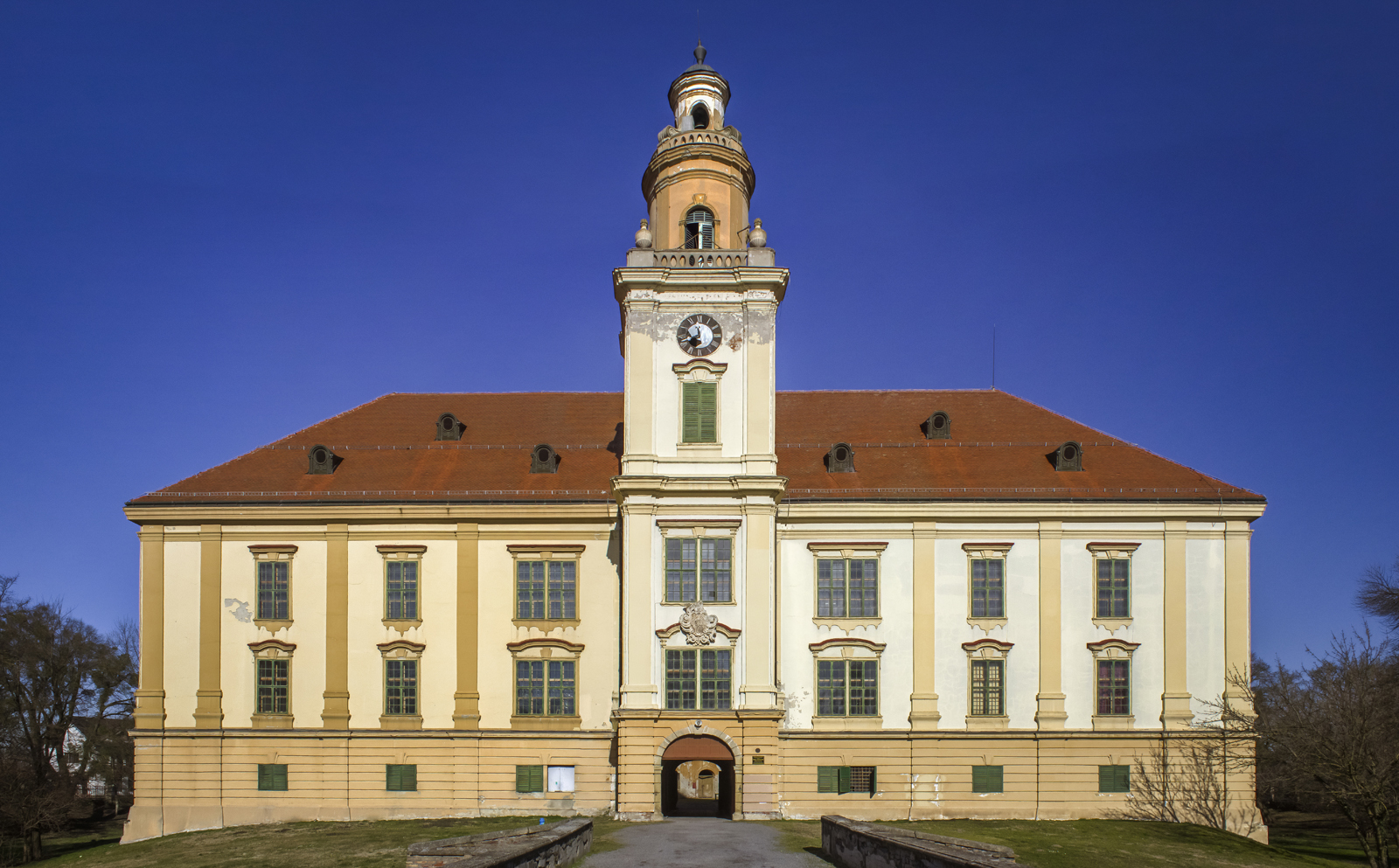
- Facade of the castle
- Interactive map of the Prandau-Normann castle in Valpovo area

General information
- Architectural style: Baroque, Gothic
- Location: Valpovo, Croatia
- Coordinates: 45.659°N 18.415°E

Height
- Height: 37 m (121 ft)

Technical details
- Floor area: 431m^{2}

Prandau-Normann Castle or Valpovo Castle is a palace or castle in Valpovo, Croatia. It was owned by the noble Prandau-Normann family from the baroque period.

The Valpovo Castle complex consists of the main palace, the medieval tower, the Holy Trinity Chapel and the side wings. It acquired its present form during the first half of the 18th century with the reconstruction and addition of the medieval fortress, the lowland Wasserburg WALPO.

== History and about the Castle ==
This unique architectural ensemble never ceased to be a fortress, nor did it completely become a castle. Its facades still surprise us today with a series of different and unexpected views. The castle is a real open-air museum, a unique large exhibit that you can walk through, enter and walk through history. Ban Ivan Morović built the Walpo fortress at the very beginning of the 15th century.

After obtaining the manor in 1721, Baron Antun Petar Hilleprand von Prandau began renovation. On the southern wing of the fortress, he built a monumental palace with a prominent 37 m high tower. On the remains of the Gothic chapel, he built a new one dedicated to the Holy Trinity. Until 1885, three generations of Prandau ruled the castle, when it passed into the Normann von Ehrenfels family through marriage. At that time, the castle had 62 rooms, and with the courtyard, a total area of 431 m2. In 1945, the castle was nationalized.

== Castle today ==
Since 1954, the castle has had its new purpose as the Museum of the Valpovo Region

As part of a tour of the castle complex, visitors are offered a visit to an exhibition of the legacy of a noble family, a walk through the picturesque inner courtyard of the Valpovo fortress and castle, a walk through the authentic medieval interior of its tower and a climb to the lookout at the top, from which there is a view of Valpovo and the surrounding area, a tour of the castle chapel to the sounds of its valuable historical organ. The tour also includes a tour of the moat and gardens next to the castle, a view of the auxiliary buildings of the complex, the theater building and the forest-hunting ground, and an introduction to interesting historical stories and legends related to the castle and its inhabitants. Occasional exhibitions are often held in the castle premises, and classical music concerts are held in the castle chapel.

== Gallery ==
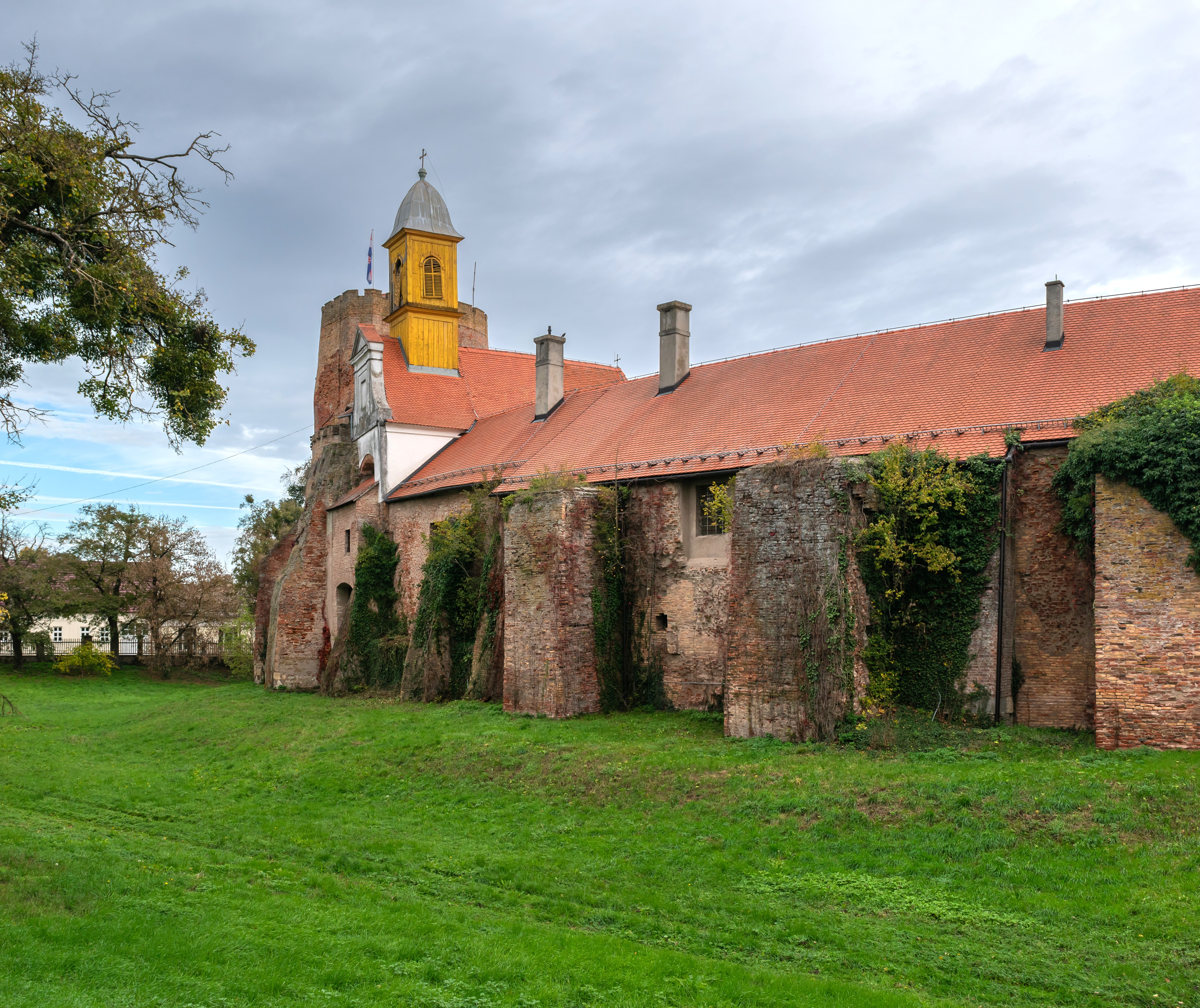

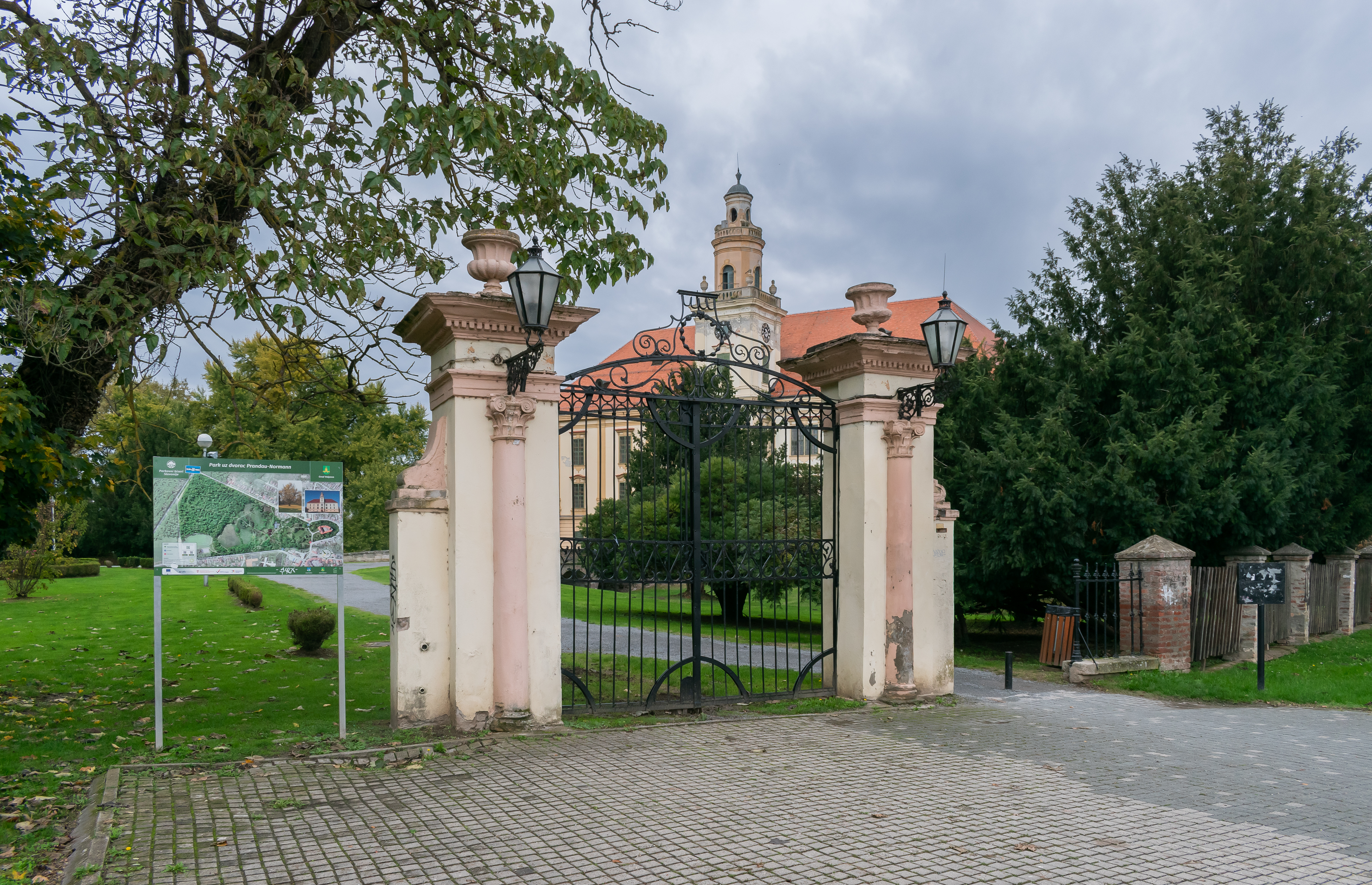

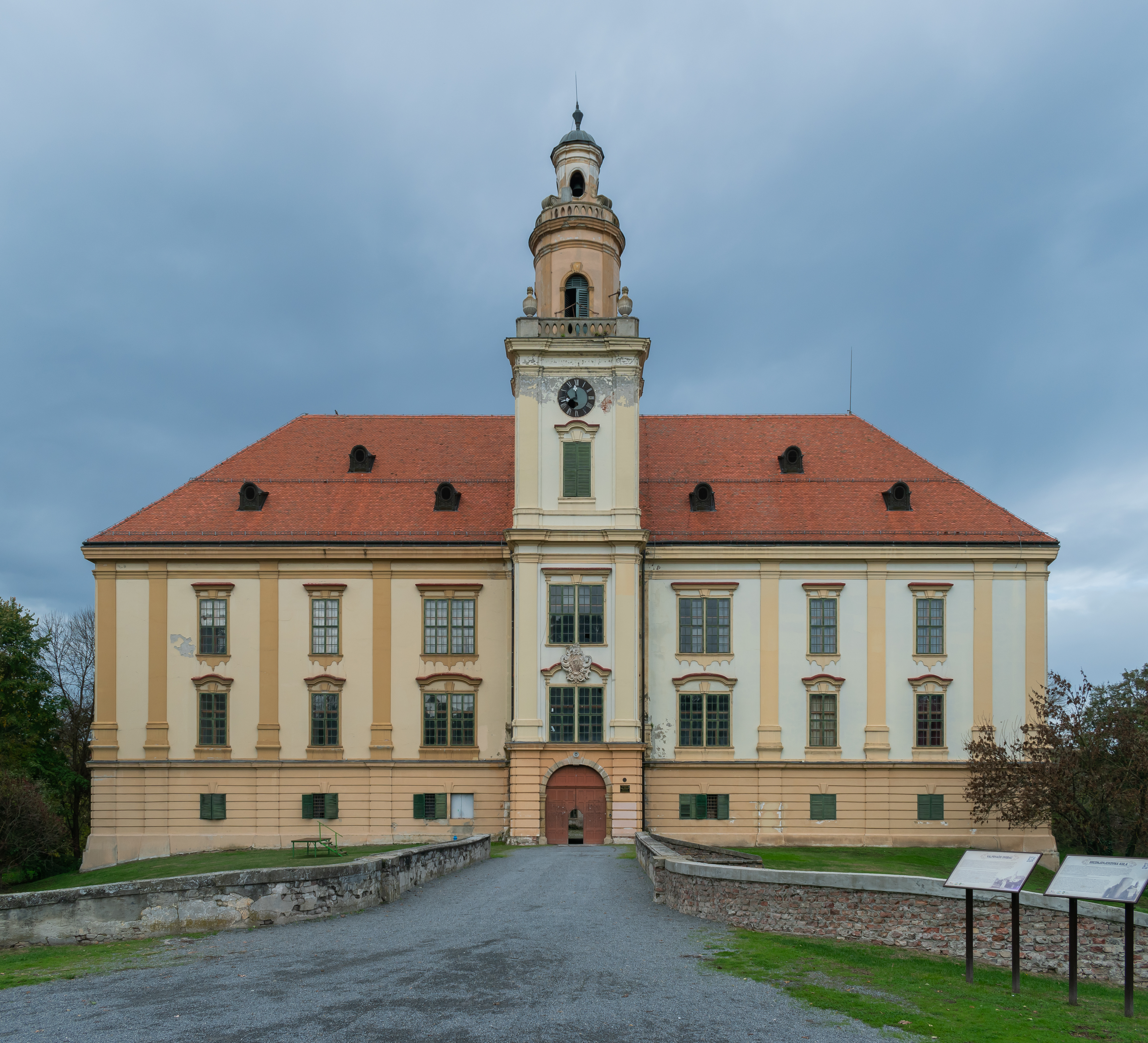

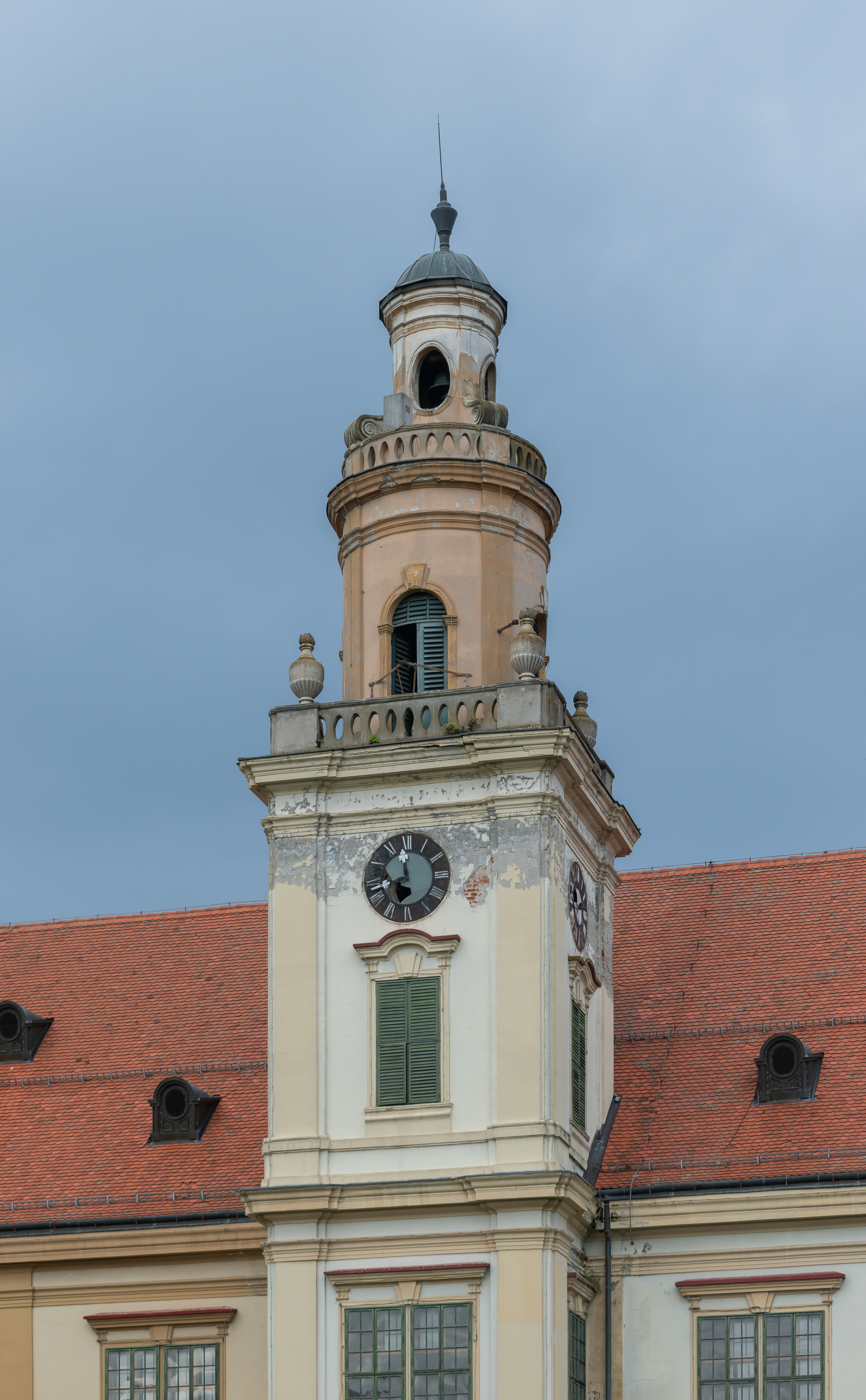

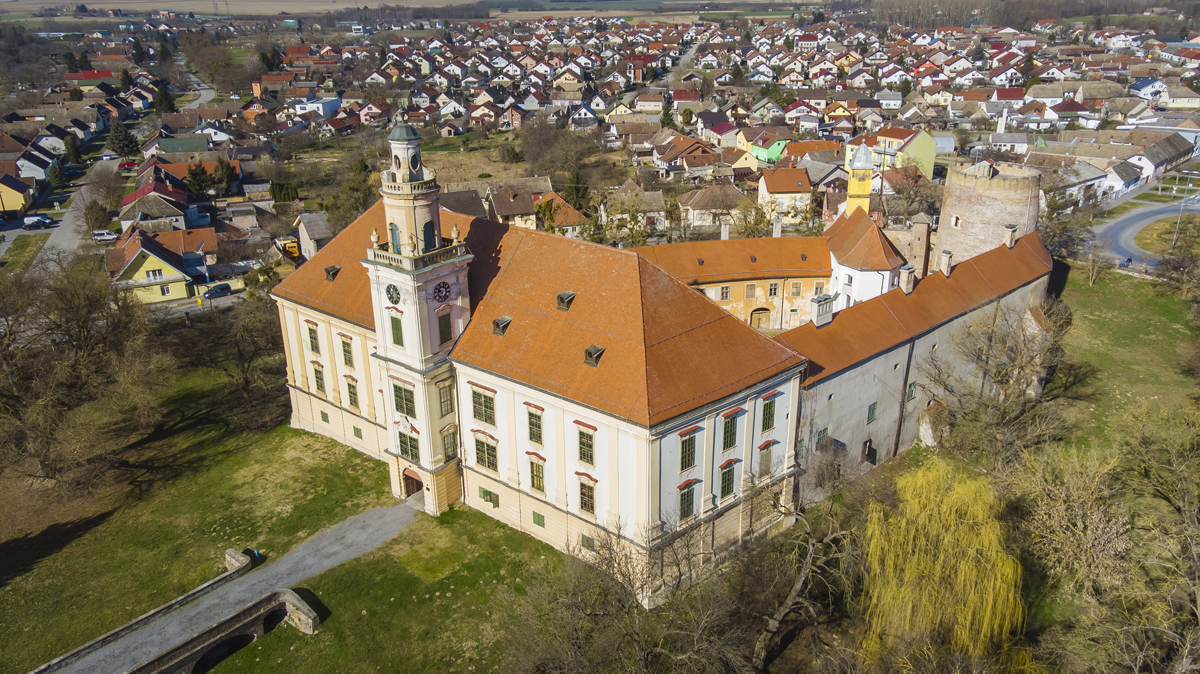
