= Valpovo work camp =

Concentration camp

Valpovo
- Work camp
- Location of Valpovo within Yugoslavia
- Coordinates: 45.66°N 18.42°E
- Location: Valpovo, PR Croatia, FPR Yugoslavia
- Operated by: Ministry of the Interior, Zagreb
- Original use: Arbeitsdienst barracks
- Operational: May 1945 – May 1946
- Inmates: Primarily Volksdeutsche
- Number of inmates: c. 4,000
- Killed: 1,074 – c. 1,600
- Notable inmates: Viktor Axmann

The Valpovo work camp (Croatian: Radni logor Valpovo, German: Arbeitslager Walpau) was a camp set up by the communist regime of Yugoslavia for Germans and Austrians in the aftermath of the Second World War. The camp operated from 1945 to 1946.

Germans and Austrians on Croatian territory were considered by the Yugoslav authorities to be collectively guilty for Nazi crimes. With the fall of the Independent State of Croatia in May 1945, camps for Croatian German civilians were formed in Valpovo, Josipovac, and Krndija.

Approximately four thousand people passed through the camp. They were subjected to forced labor, mostly in agriculture. According to the survivors' testimonies, there were no executions at the camp, save for a few incidents. However, due to the harsh living conditions and lack of food and medical care, prisoners fell victim to disease, particularly during a severe outbreak of epidemic typhus in early 1946. From May 1945 to May 1946, at least 1,074 people are known to have died at the camp. The dead were buried in the local cemetery, some in unmarked graves. Upon the closing of the camp in May 1946, the prisoners were either released, transferred to other work camps, or reassigned to forced labor tasks in the eastern Slavonia and Baranya areas.

In 2003, a monument to the camp's victims was raised in Valpovo cemetery. The unveiling was attended by camp survivors, Croatian and German officials, politicians and diplomats, and was accompanied by a mass by then-bishop of Đakovo-Syrmia, Marin Srakić.

== See also ==
- Forced labor of Germans after World War II
- Persecution of Danube Swabians

== Sources ==
- Bijelić, Borislav (October 2002). "Vladimir Geiger, Radni logor Valpovo 1945.-1946, Osijek, 1999" (PDF). Scrinia Slavonica (in Croatian). 2 (1): 572–575.
- Geiger, Vladimir (1999). Radni logor Valpovo 1945.-1946 (in Croatian). Osijek: Landsmannschaft der Donauschwaben in Kroatien.
- Geiger, Vladimir (January 2007). "Logori za folksdojčere u Hrvatskoj nakon Drugoga svjetskog rata 1945-1947" [Camps for Volksdeutsch in Croatia after the Second World War, 1945 to 1947] (PDF). Časopis za suvremenu povijest (in Croatian). 38 (3): 1081–1100.
