= Valpovo =

- Town
- Grad Valpovo; Town of Valpovo
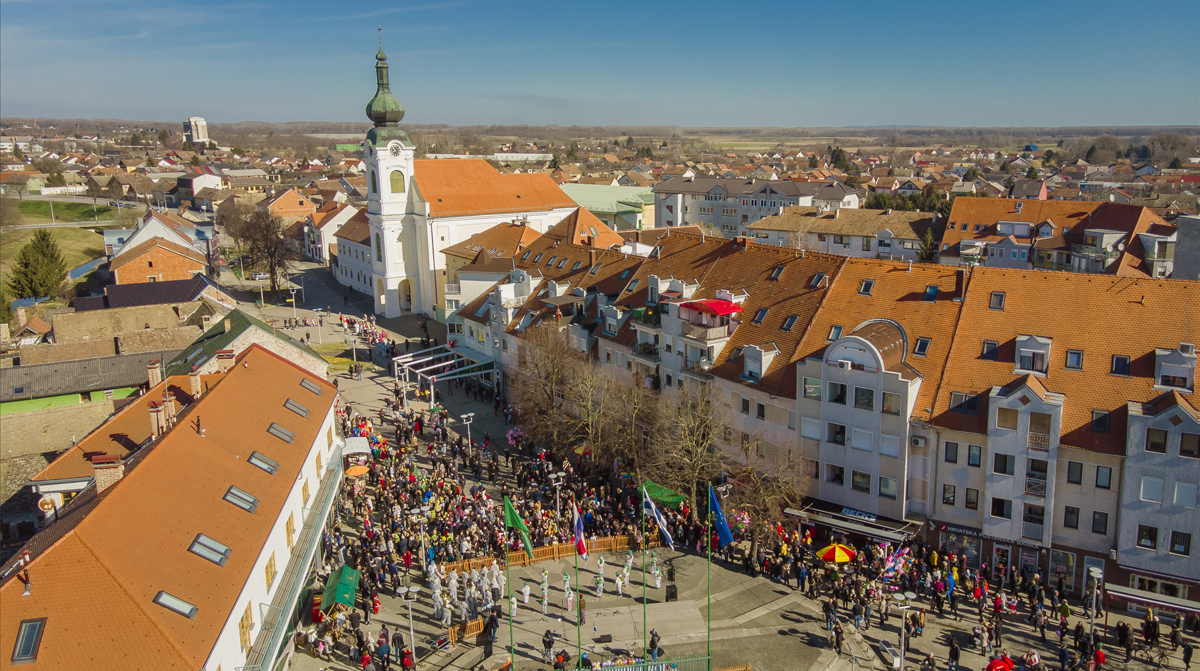
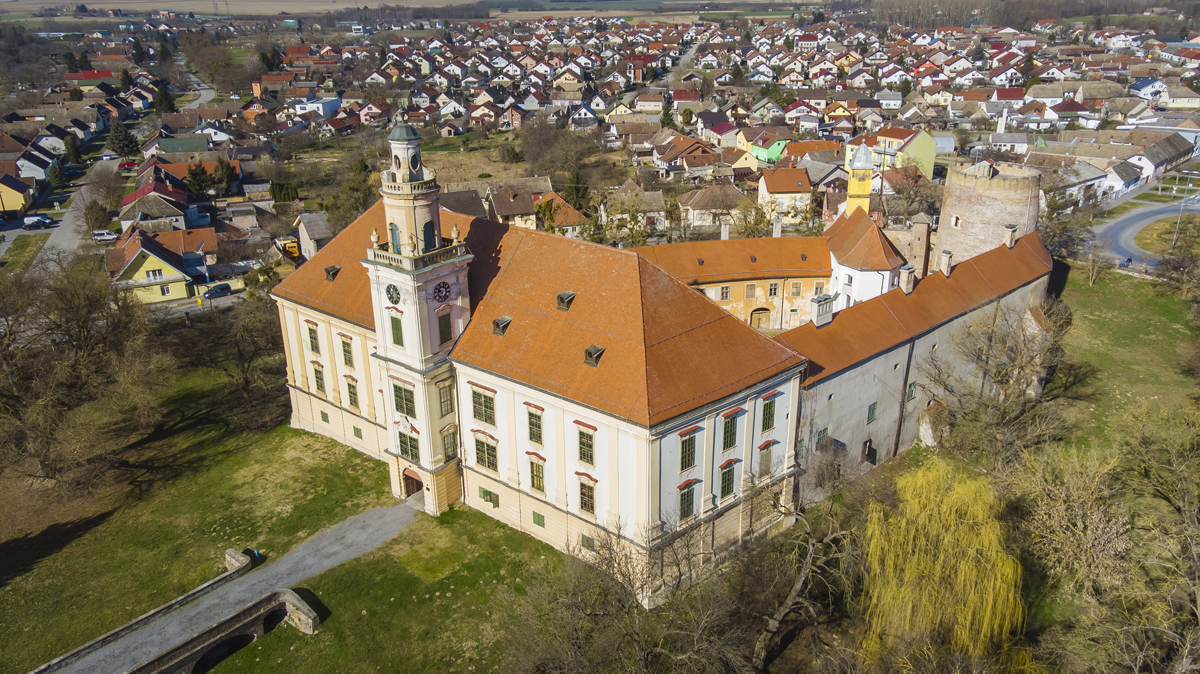
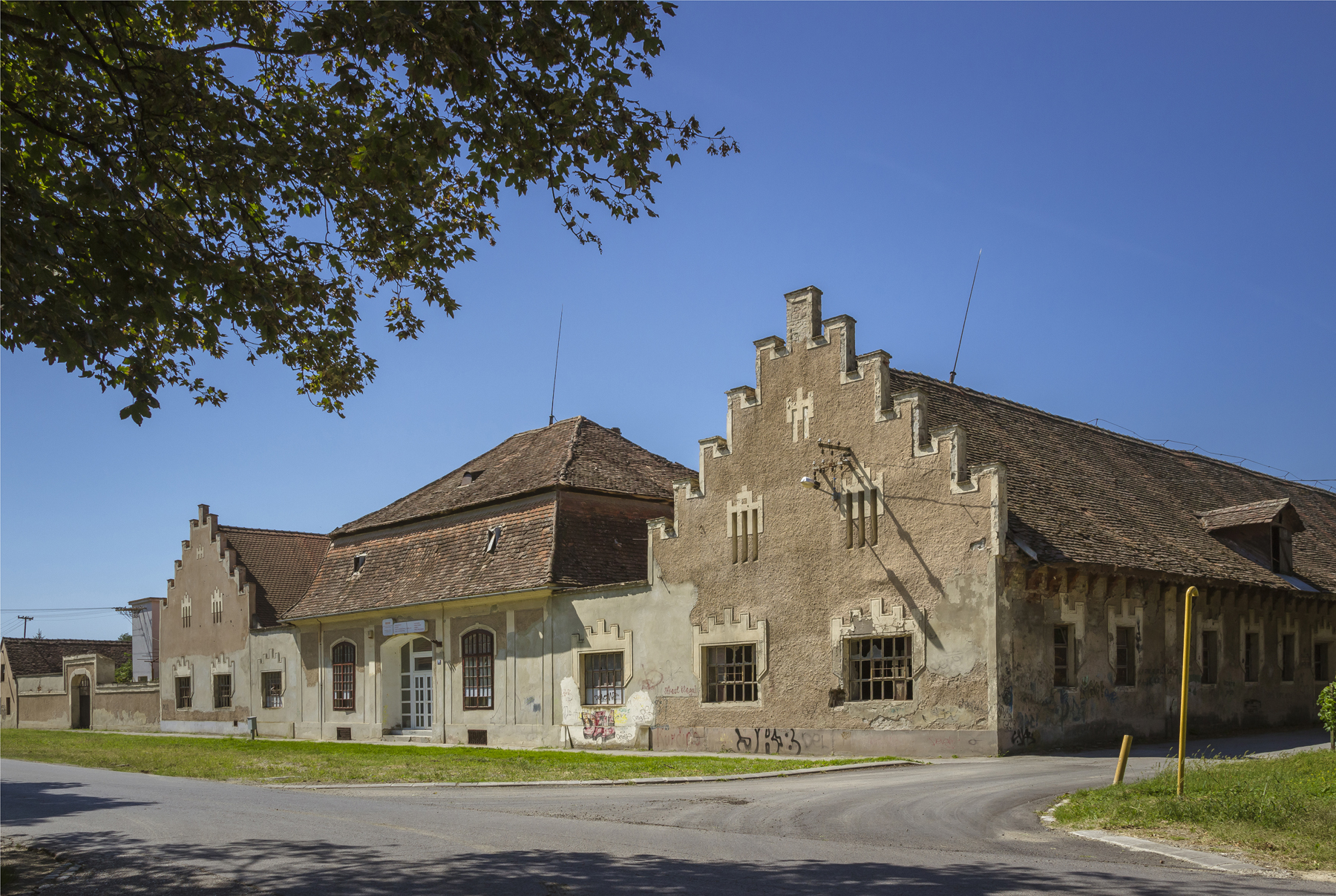
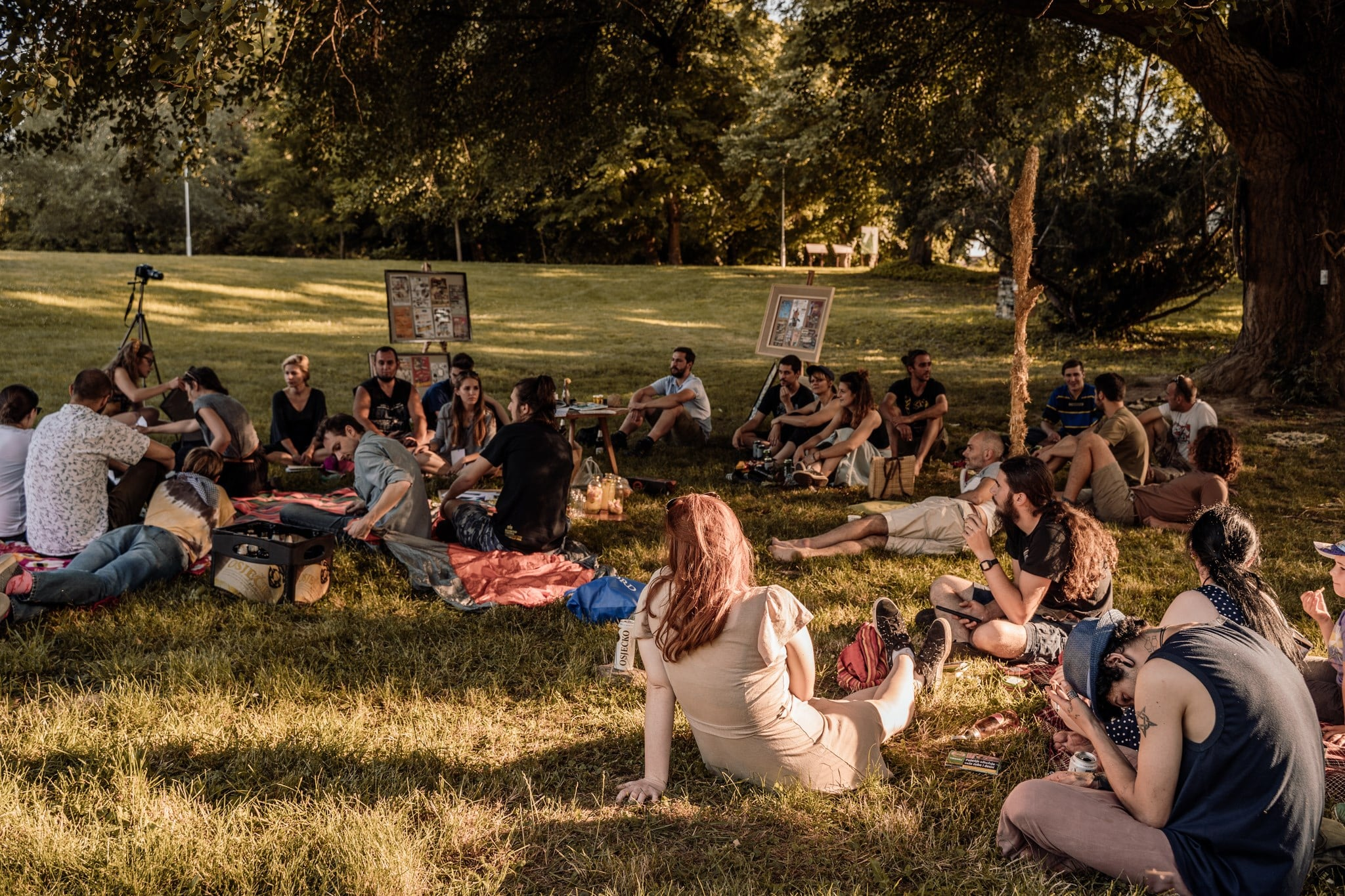
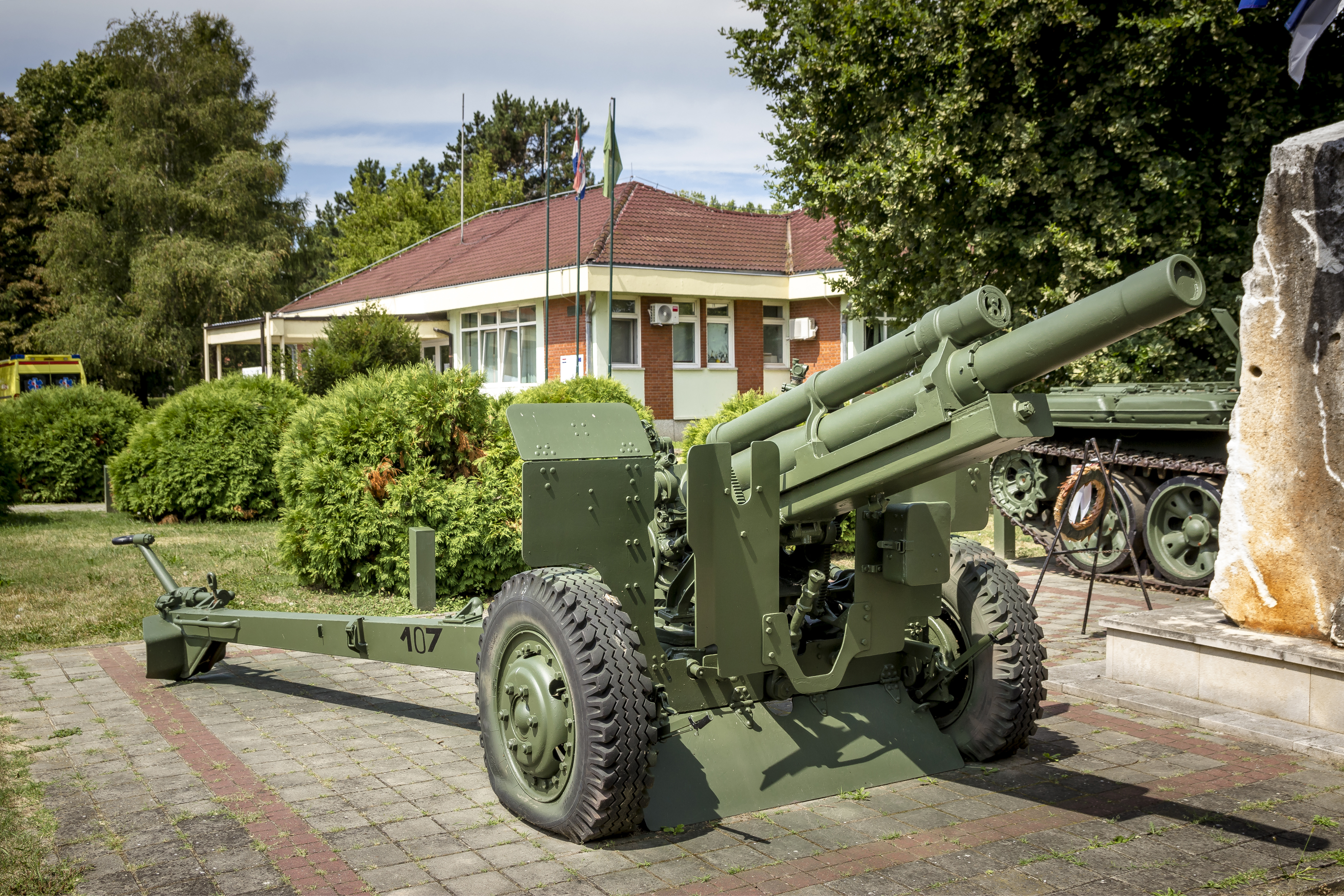
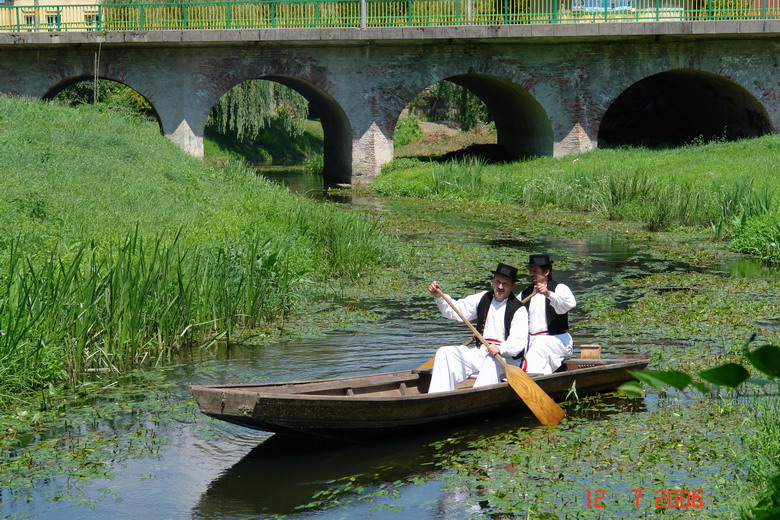
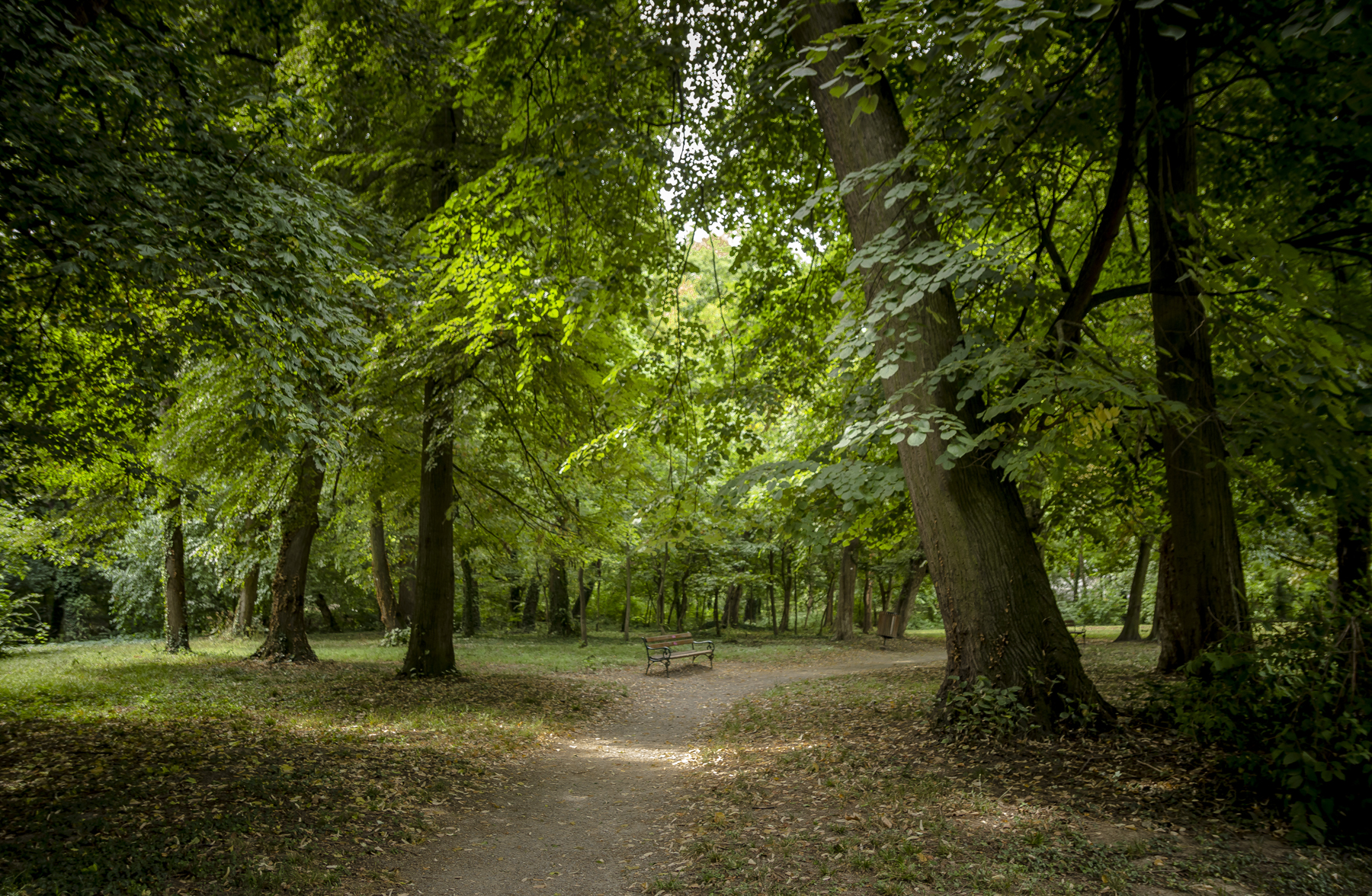
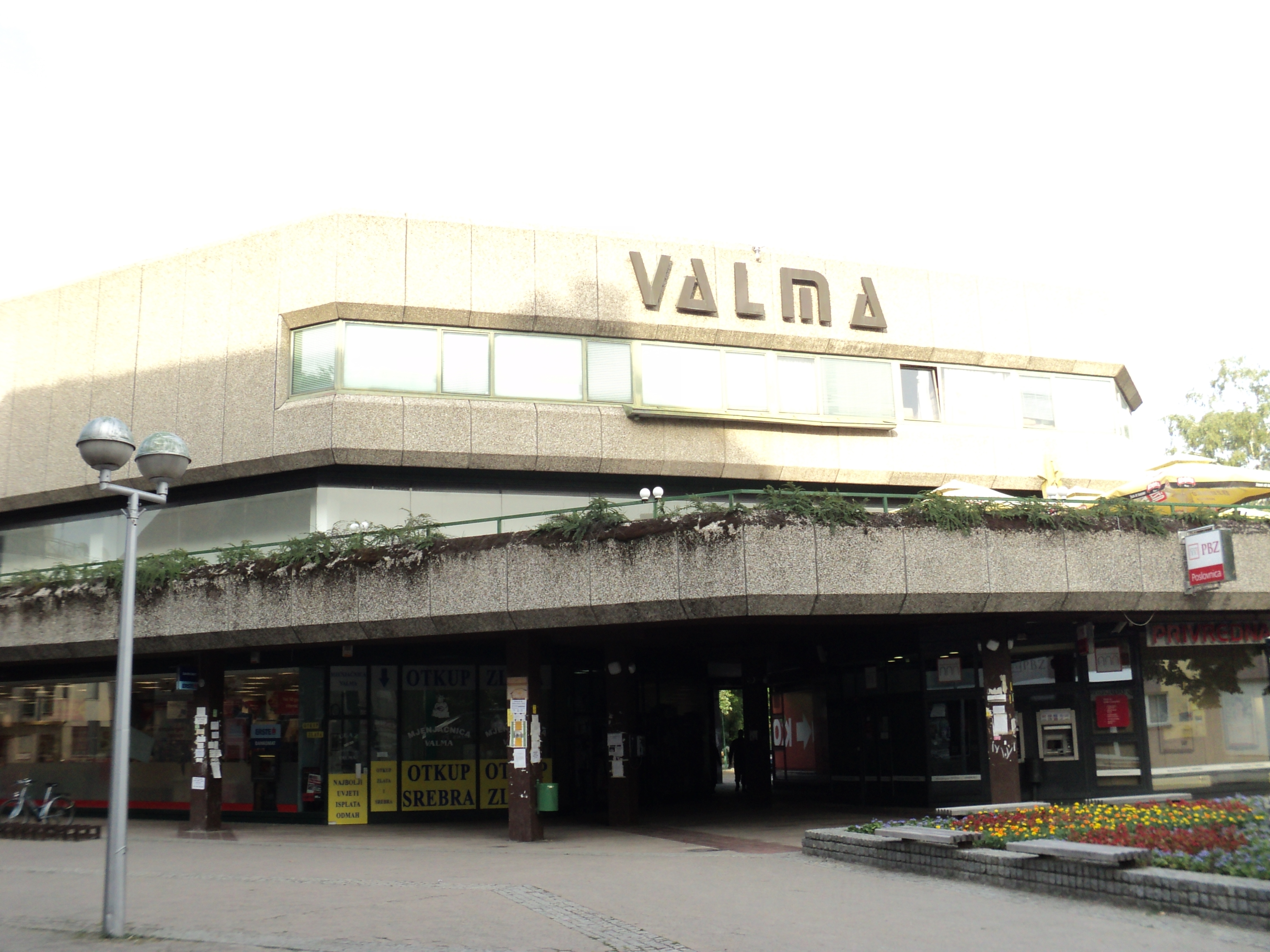
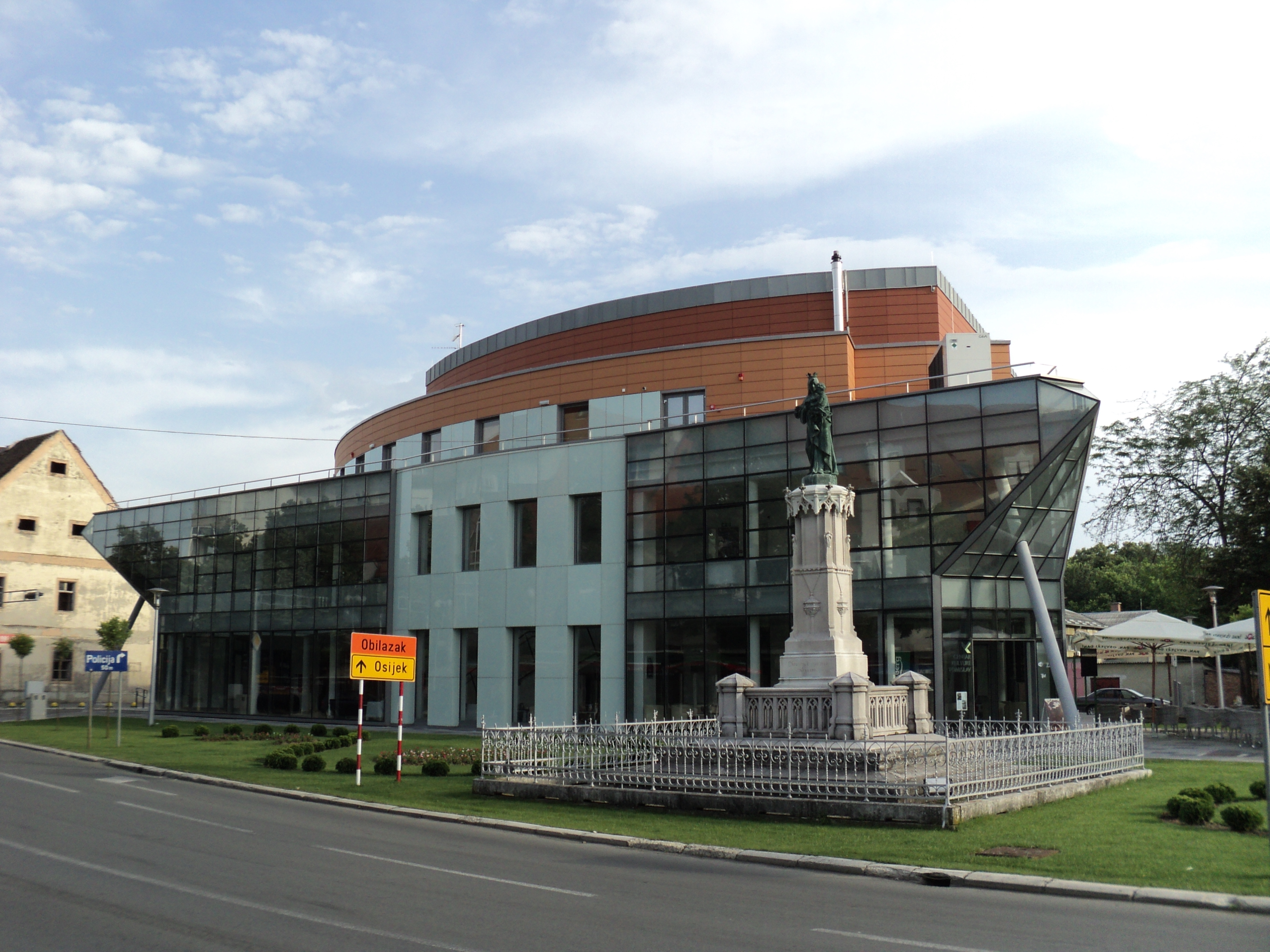
- Valpovo

- Seal

- Location of Valpovo in Croatia Valpovo (Croatia) Valpovo (Europe)
- Coordinates: 45.66°N 18.42°E
- Country: Croatia
- Region: Slavonia (Podunavlje)
- County: Osijek-Baranja County

Government
  - Mayor: Matko Šutalo (Ind.)

Area
  - Town: 141.2 km^{2} (54.5 sq mi)
  - Urban: 40.1 km^{2} (15.5 sq mi)
- Elevation: 91 m (299 ft)

Population (2021)
  - Town: 9,784
  - Density: 69.29/km^{2} (179.5/sq mi)
  - Urban: 6,332
  - Urban density: 158/km^{2} (409/sq mi)
- Time zone: UTC+1 (CET)
- Website: valpovo.hr

Valpovo is a town in Slavonia, Croatia. It is close to the Drava river, 25 km (16 mi) northwest of Osijek. As of 2021, the population of Valpovo is 7,406, with a total of 11,563 in the municipality.

== Name ==
In Hungarian the town is known as Valpó and in German as Walpach. In antiquity, it was called Iovalum. There are several suggested etymologies. One is that it comes from the Latin root *Iov-, meaning "divine". However, the ending can't be explained by Latin. One explanation is that it comes from the Indo-European words *yow and *h2elut, so that it means "magical beer." The other, more likely, is that it comes from the Indo-European roots *yow and *h2elom, so that it means "magical herb", whatever plant that signified. Perhaps the simplest explanation is that it comes from the Indo-European word *wel, meaning "valley", whatever "Io-" meant.

== Climate ==
Since records began in 1964, the highest temperature recorded at the local weather station was 40.4 °C (104.7 °F), on 20 July 2007. The coldest temperature was −25.0 °C (−13.0 °F), on 13 January 2003.

== Demographics ==
The settlements in the municipal area of Valpovo are:

- Harkanovci, population 506
- Ivanovci, population 460
- Ladimirevci, population 1,587
- Marjančaci, population 308
- Nard, population 516
- Šag, population 429
- Valpovo, population 7,406
- Zelčin, population 351

In the census of 2011, the absolute majority were Croats.

Town of Valpovo: Population trends 1857–2021
v

population	6805	7390	7126	8154	8888	9159	8900	9033	8920	9483	10515	11509	12107	12607	12327	11563	9784
	1857	1869	1880	1890	1900	1910	1921	1931	1948	1953	1961	1971	1981	1991	2001	2011	2021

Sources: Croatian Bureau of Statistics publications

== History ==
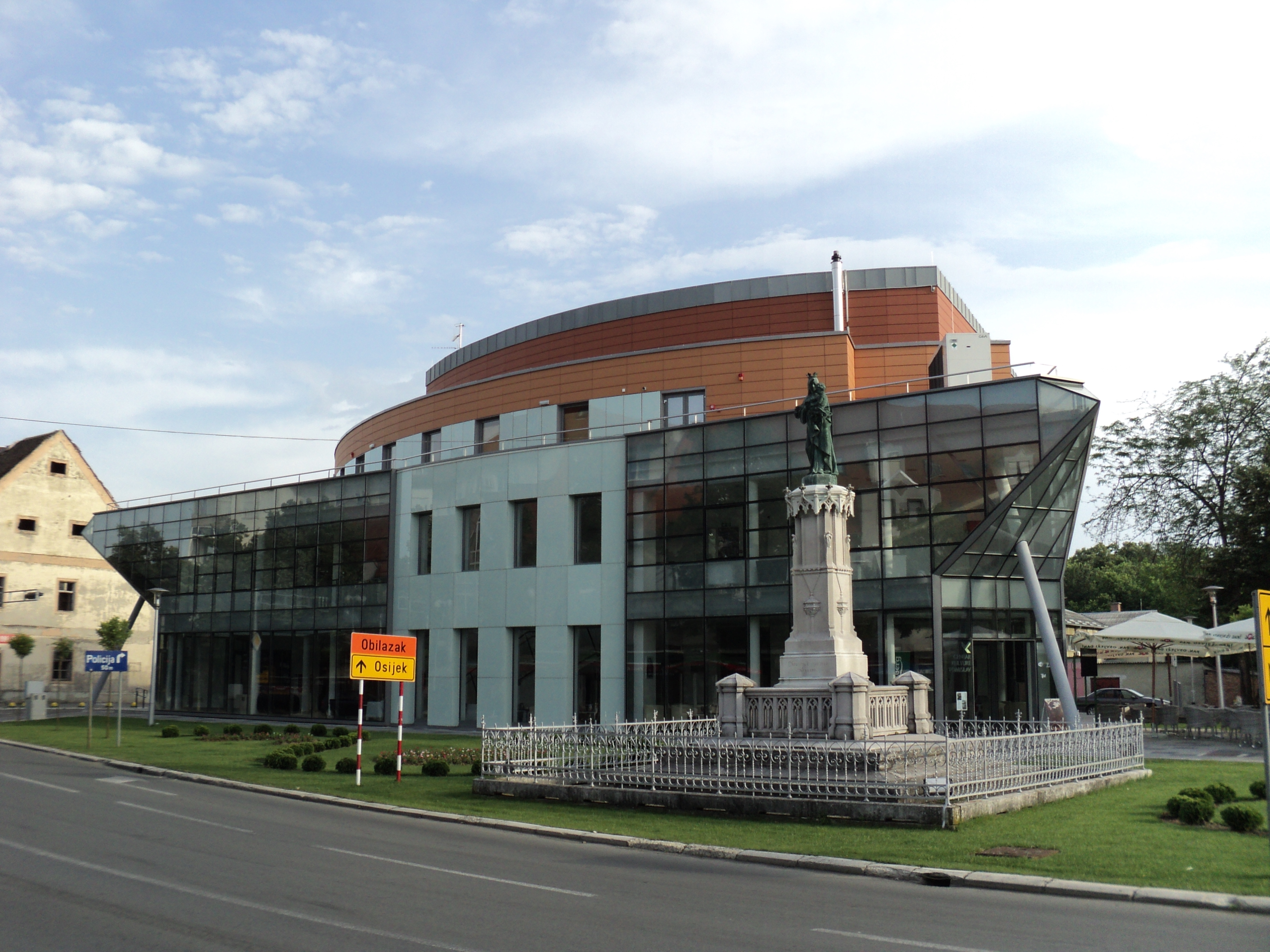
Valpovo Culture Center

The town is first mentioned in 1332. In June of 1543, during Sultan Suleiman's campaign into Hungary, Valpovo was besieged, taken, and annexed to the Ottoman Empire. It was initially a kaza centre in the Sanjak of Pojega until 1601. It was later in sanjak centre in Kanije Eyalet until Austrian conquest in 1687.

In the late 19th and early 20th century, Valpovo was part of the Virovitica County of the Kingdom of Croatia-Slavonia. In March 1945, German forces launched Operation Spring Awakening. On the southern arm which moved north through Valpovo was the 1st Cossack Cavalry Division. The operation was as disastrous as it was ambitious. Yugoslav partisans of the 3rd Army (Yugoslav Partisans) continuously harassed and delayed the Cossacks. Shortly after the end of World War II, officials in the communist Yugoslav regime established a labor camp for Germans which operated until May 1946.

== Economy ==
Economy is based on farming, livestock breeding, forestry, wood and timber and foodstuffs industries; close to the town are oil and natural gas deposits. Valpovo lies on a regional road that connects it to Osijek and Donji Miholjac, as well a road to Belišće and to Bizovac through Ladimirevci.

== Attractions ==
Located close to the banks of the Drava river (5 km), Valpovo was an ancient dwelling of feudal families. Major tourist attraction include important cultural and historical heritage, (remains of a mediaeval fortification, the old brickwork bridge, churches) and a landscaped park, protected as a horticultural monument. Prandau-Normann Castle: Count Normann-Ehrenfels and Baron Prandau-Hilleprandt had a magnificent castle that was rebuilt seven times. They planted 121 herbal sorts on 250,000 square meters. Valpovo's park is one of the most beautiful in Slavonia.

The most important annual event is the Valpovo Summer (Croatian: Ljeto valpovačko), attended by a number of cultural clubs with folklore, music, theatrical and other performances. Angling opportunities are provided on the nearby rivers Karašica, Vučica, Drava, as well as on lakes and fishponds; hunting grounds are offered nearby. Slavonian specialities, venison and freshwater fish, and quality wines add to the visitor opportunities of the Valpovo region.
