= Karašica (Drava) =

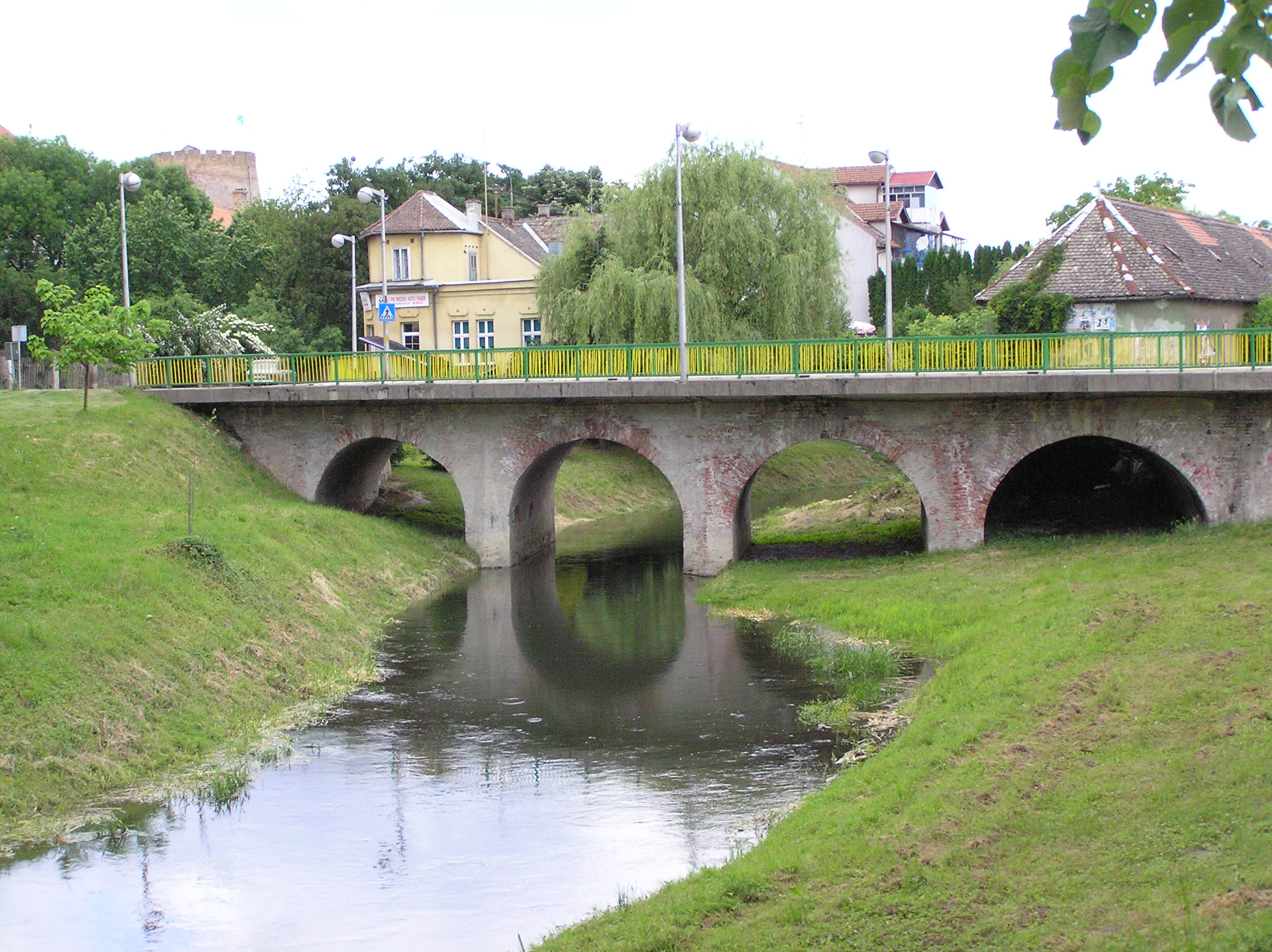

Location
- Country: Croatia

Physical characteristics
- Source: Voćinska rijeka
  - location: Čađavica
- Mouth
  - location: Drava
  - coordinates: 45.6011°N 18.5893°E
- Length: 91 km (57 mi)
- Basin size: 936 km^{2} (361 sq mi)

Basin features
- Progression: Drava→ Danube→ Black Sea
- Tributaries
  - right: Vučica

Karašica is a river in eastern Croatia whose length, combined with its tributary Vučica, is 150 kilometres (93 mi), and whose basin covers 2,347 square kilometres (906 sq mi).

Karašica and Vučica rise in the mountain of Papuk and flow towards the northeast into a plain, where they meander in an eastward direction. Vučica discharges into Karašica between Valpovo and Ladimirevci and the river flows into the Drava north of Josipovac.

The length of the Karašica is a matter analyzed by geographers because of its ambiguity. The toponym Karašica is used for the river flow after the confluence of lower Voćinska rijeka and lower Branjinska rijeka, near Crnac, which is also modified with the nearby Voćin-Drava canal. However, using the natural river flow, the whole of Voćinska rijeka and its headwater Jovanovica is part of Karašica, which adds another 54.4 km (33.8 mi) to the length, for a total of 148.2 km (92.1 mi). This would earn this river the distinction of being the single longest river that is exclusively in Croatia.

== The origin of the name "Karašica" ==
Several etymologies have been proposed for the river name "Karašica", of which two have gained significant traction among linguists.

One is that "Karašica" comes from kara šuv, proposed to mean "black water" in some unattested Turkic language which was spoken in Croatia in the Early Middle Ages (from Proto-Turkic *"kara sub", *kara meaning "black" and *sub meaning "water"). That etymology is supported by the Hungarian etymologist Melich Janos. Melich Janos' main argument is that Karašica was sometimes called Feketeviz in medieval sources, which means "black water" in Hungarian. In other words, Melich Janos supposes the medieval Hungarian name Feketeviz to have been a calque. This etymology is also advocated by the Croatian linguist Petar Skok, though he reconstructs the Turkic word as Karasu and not kara šuv. Petar Skok supposes the change from 's' to 'š' to have occurred because the Slavic suffix was not the common suffix -ica, but the less common Slavic suffix -jica, and that the change from 's' to 'š' is due to a yod-coalescence occurring within Slavic (rather than a change in Turkic, like Melich Janos supposes). Critics of that etymology say that supposing that the language in question was Turkic is arbitrary, as similar words for the color black occur in many other ancient languages, including Proto-Mongolic *kara and Proto-Indo-European *krsnos.

The second proposed etymology is that "Karašica" comes from the Latin fish name "carassius" (a name of several species of freshwater fish), perhaps being a relatively recent borrowing into Croatian. That etymology is advocated by the Croatian linguist Dubravka Ivšić and also by the Hungarian linguist Pál Hunfalvy (as cited in the Melich Janos'es paper). Melich Janos'es main argument against that etymology is that the earliest attestations of the river name Karašica (such as Karassou from the 13th century) do not have a Slavic suffix.

A third possible etymology, sometimes cited in (mostly non-linguistic) literature and supported by a computer engineer called Teo Samaržija in his 2022 paper, is that "Karašica" comes from an Illyrian name *Kurr-urr-issia (flow - water - suffix), borrowed into Proto-Slavic as *Kъrъrьsьja, changing to *Karrasja after the Havlík's law, then to *Karaša after the yod-coalescence and the loss of geminate consonants in Croatian, to which the Slavic suffix -ica was later added. The main argument for there being a verb root *kurr in Illyrian meaning "to flow" is that similar river names (starting with the consonants 'k' and 'r') occur all across Croatia, and this correlation would be improbable without an etymological connection. The element *kurr (to flow) is supposed to come from *ḱers meaning to run, the element *urr (water) is supposed to come from woh₁-r̥ meaning water, and -issia is supposed to be the same suffix as in Certissia, the ancient name for Đakovo. Teo Samaržija attempted to make this etymology more mainstream by supporting it with information theory statistical calculations (that the probability of that k-r pattern in the Croatian river names occurring by chance is somewhere between 1/300 and 1/17) and by noting that there is a verb kuriti meaning "to flow" in the Silba dialect of Croatian (as in the phrase "vrime kuri" meaning "time flows"), which could plausibly be a loanword from Illyrian *kurr. Teo Samaržija's statistical methodology has been disputed, primarily for making unrealistic linguistic assumptions (not taking into account the Sonority Sequencing Principle), and his interpretation of the dialectal Croatian word kuriti has been called into question as he did not conclusively disprove that kuriti comes via a Romance language from Latin currere (to run). Teo Samaržija responded to that objection with Sonority Sequencing Principle with a blog-post showing measurements which supposedly show that the Sonority Sequencing Principle does not seem to have much of an effect on the entropies of consonant pairs in the Croatian language, and he speculates that might be because of the Law of Open Syllables having operated in Croatian all until relatively recently (deleting low-sonority consonants from the middles of the words and the ends of the words).
