= House of Benyovszky =

Noble family in the Kingdom of Hungary

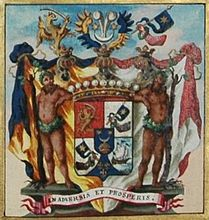
- Country: Kingdom of Hungary

The House of Benyovszky also known as Benyovszky of Benyó and Urbanó was a noted noble family in the Kingdom of Hungary. The hereditary title Count was granted to Maurice Benyovszky in 1776 and to Emanuel Benyovszky in 1791.

== See also ==
- List of titled noble families in the Kingdom of Hungary

== Sources ==
- Gudenus, János József (1991). A magyarországi főnemesség XX. századi genealogiája, I. kötet: A-J [The 20th-century Genealogy of the Titled Nobility in Hungary, Volume I: A-J]. Natura. ISBN 963-234-313-1.
