= Kucura =

Kucura Куцура (Serbian) Коцур (Pannonian Rusyn)
- Village (Selo)
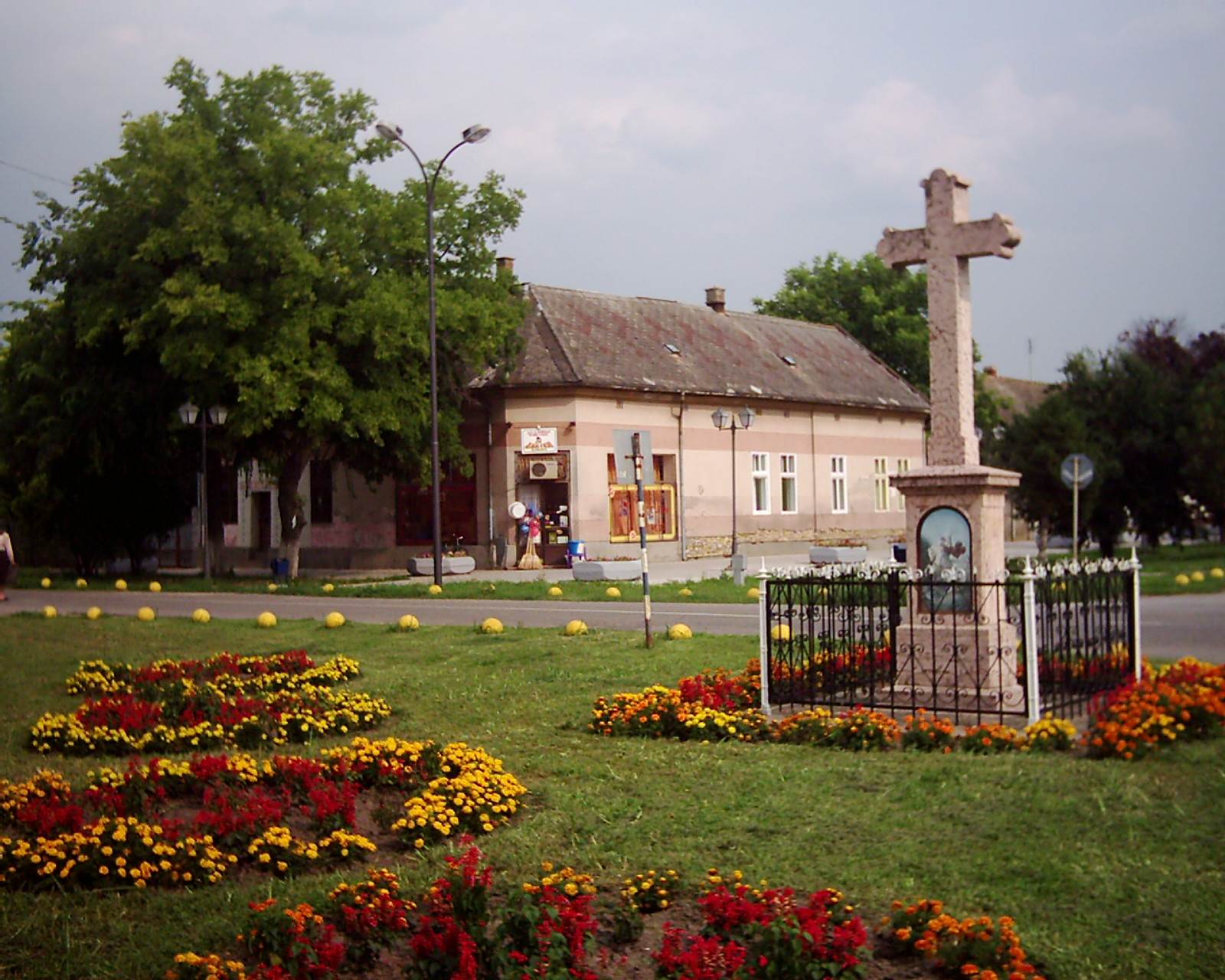

- Location within Vojvodina Location within Serbia Location within Europe
- Coordinates: 45°31′N 19°35′E
- Country: Serbia
- Province: Vojvodina
- Region: Bačka (Podunavlje)
- District: South Bačka
- Municipality: Vrbas

Population (2022)
  - Total: 3,952
- Time zone: UTC+1 (CET)
  - Summer (DST): UTC+2 (CEST)

Kucura (Serbian Cyrillic: Куцура; Pannonian Rusyn: Коцур; Hungarian: Kucora) is a village located in the municipality of Vrbas, South Bačka District, Vojvodina, Serbia. The village has a population of 3,952 (2022 census).

== History ==
Kucura is mentioned for the first time in a Turkish defter from 1580. At that time, Kucura had 18 taxpayers, probably Hungarians. In the report of Bačka County from 1715, it is mentioned that Kucura was a small place with only 5 taxpayers. At that time, the Serbian population lived in Kucura.

In 1763, the State Chamber instructed Peter Kiš from Krstur to recruit the Ruthenian population in the northern Hungarian counties for the settlement of Kucura, which he did after signing a contract with the regional administrator of Bačka, Redl. Thus began the settlement of Rusyns in Kucura.

Kiš, according to the contract, was supposed to bring 150 Rusyns families from northern Hungary to Kucura, but he failed to do so. In 1763, 41 Rusyns families came to Kucura, and in 1767, only another 47 Rusyns families came.

The State Chamber wanted Kucura to be a purely Catholic settlement, and in 1777 they ordered the Serbs, who were almost half of the population of Kucura, to move to Obrovac. In 1792, 258 Rusyns families already lived in Kucura.

== Demographics ==
=== Historical population ===
- 1961: 4,881
- 1971: 4,655
- 1981: 4,687
- 1991: 4,713
- 2002: 4,663
- 2011: 4,348
- 2022: 3,952

=== Ethnic groups ===
According to data from the 2022 census, ethnic groups in the village include:

- 1,671 (42.3%) Rusyns
- 1,617 (40.9%) Serbs
- Others/Undeclared/Unknown

== Notable people ==
- Ljubomir Fejsa

== Gallery ==
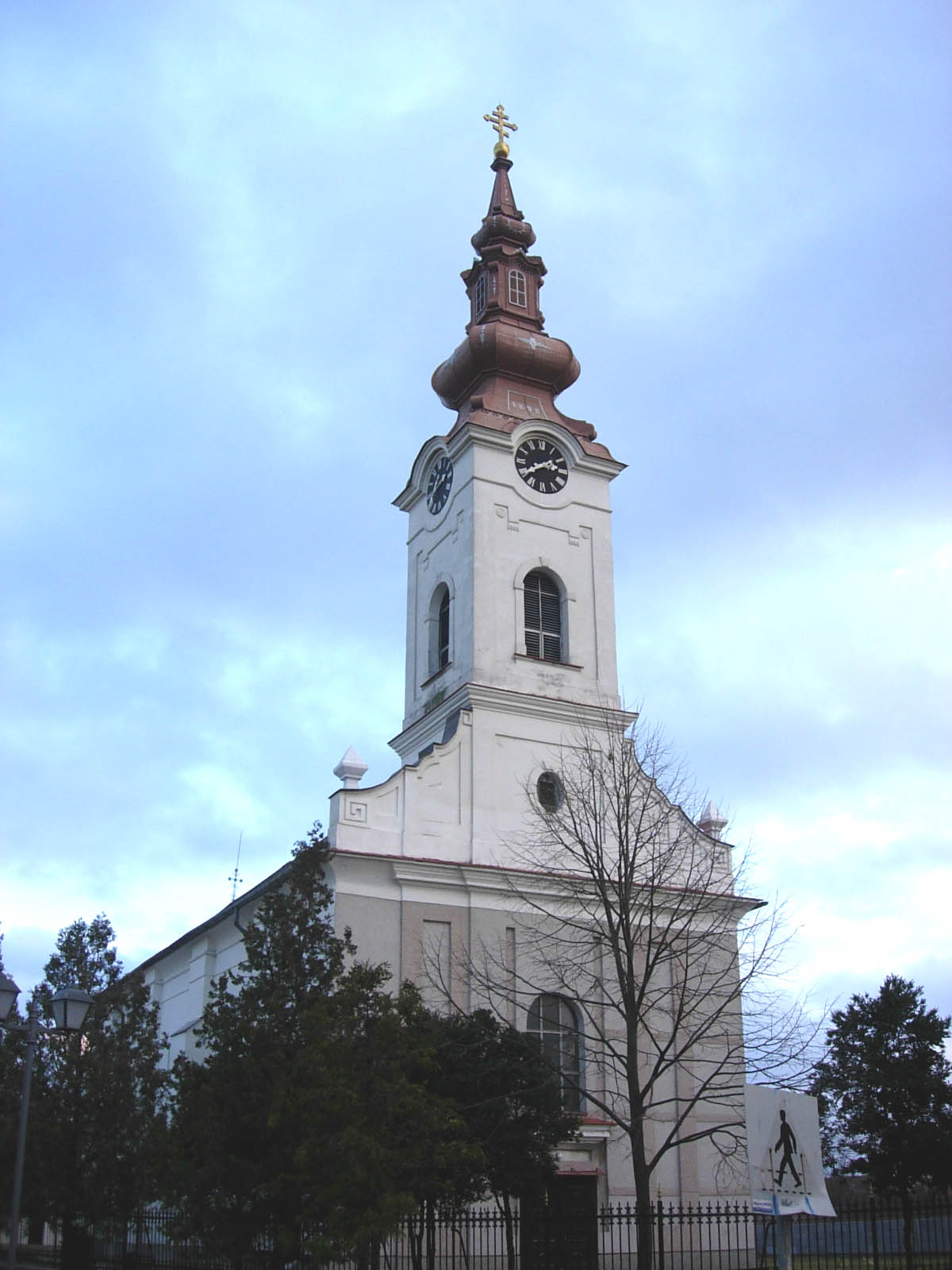
The Uniate church.

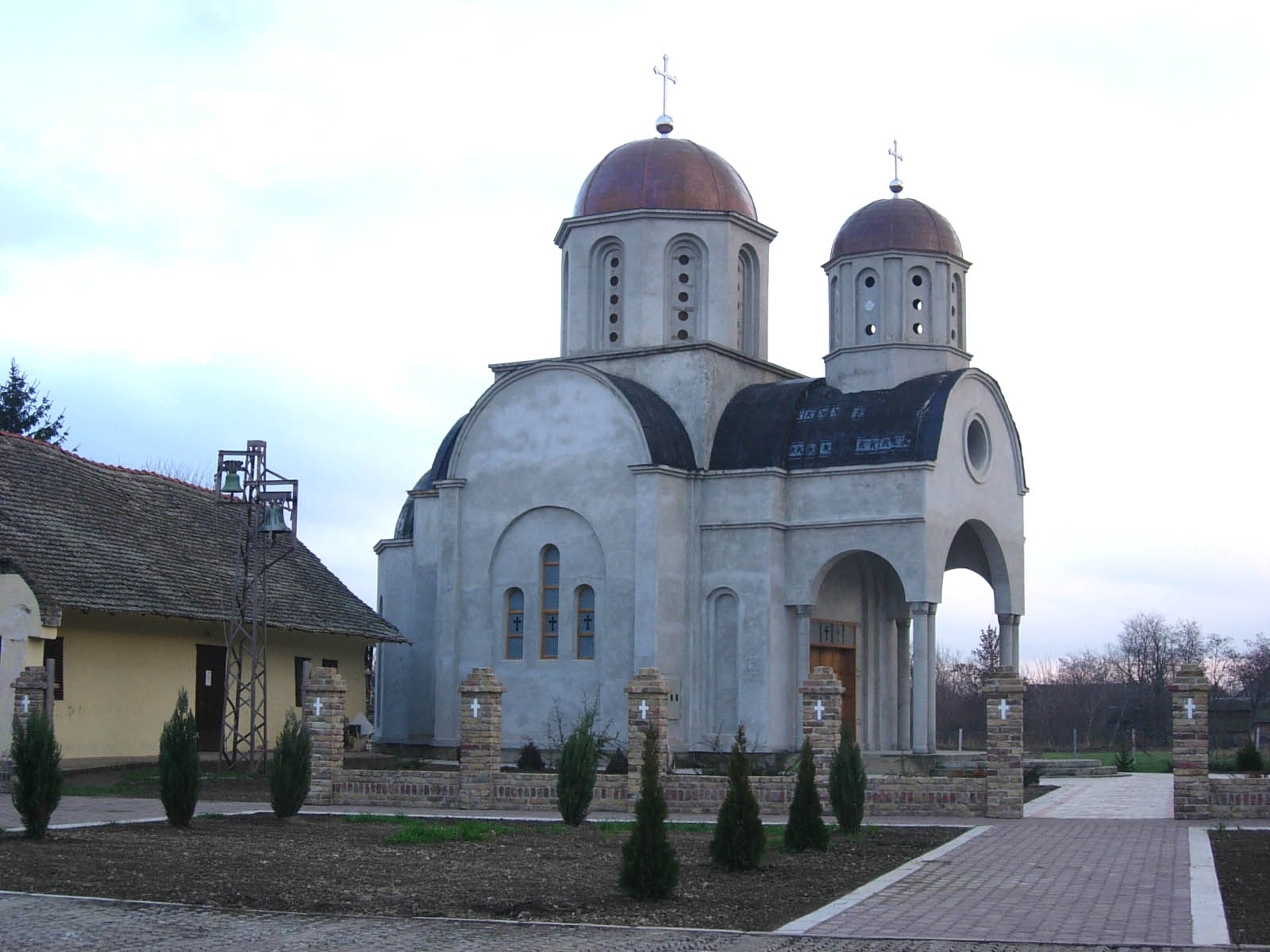
The Orthodox church.

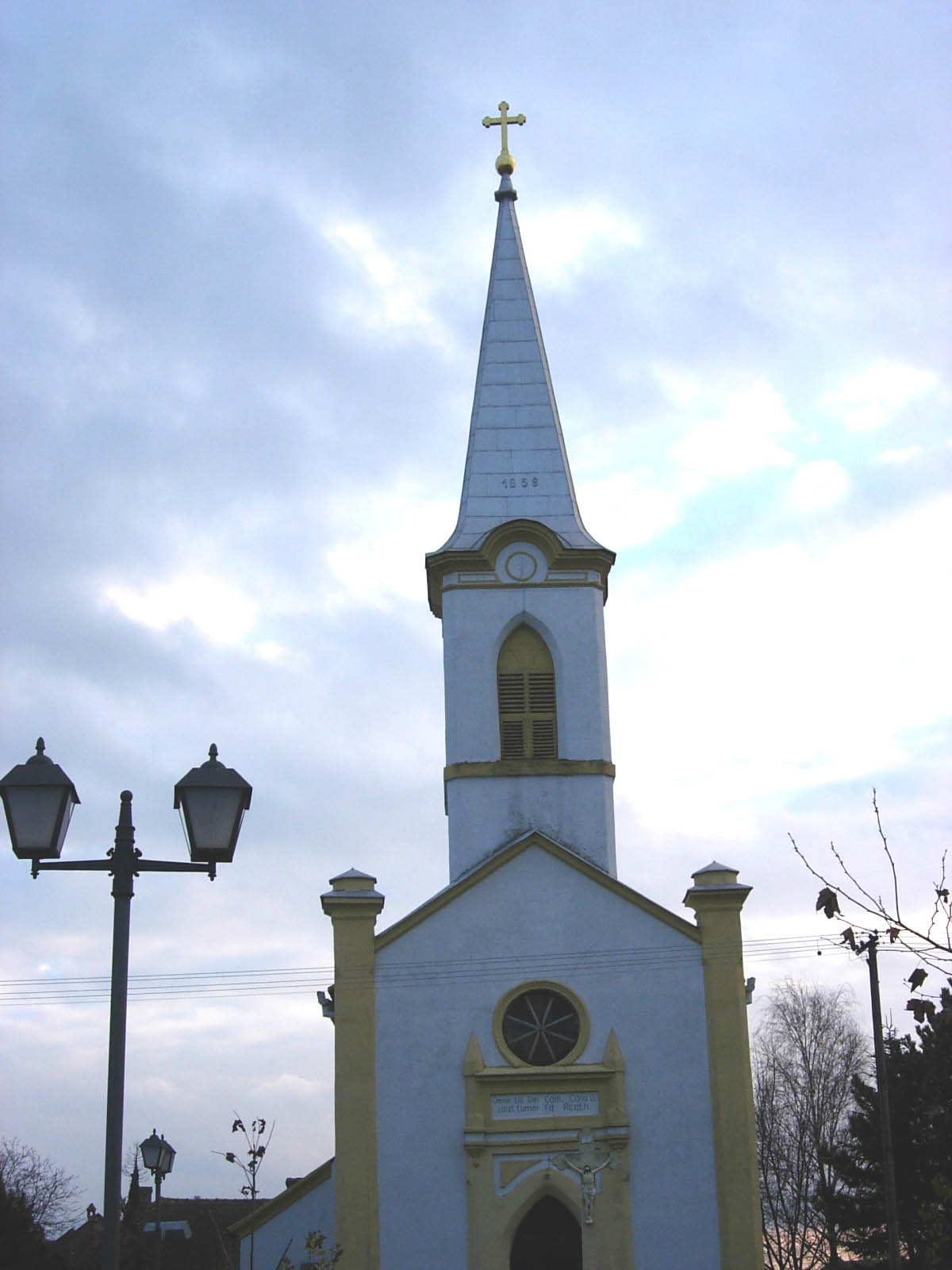
All Saints Catholic Church.

== See also ==
- List of places in Serbia
- List of cities, towns and villages in Vojvodina
