= Svinjarevci =

Coordinates: 45°15′N 18°58′E

- Village (Selo)
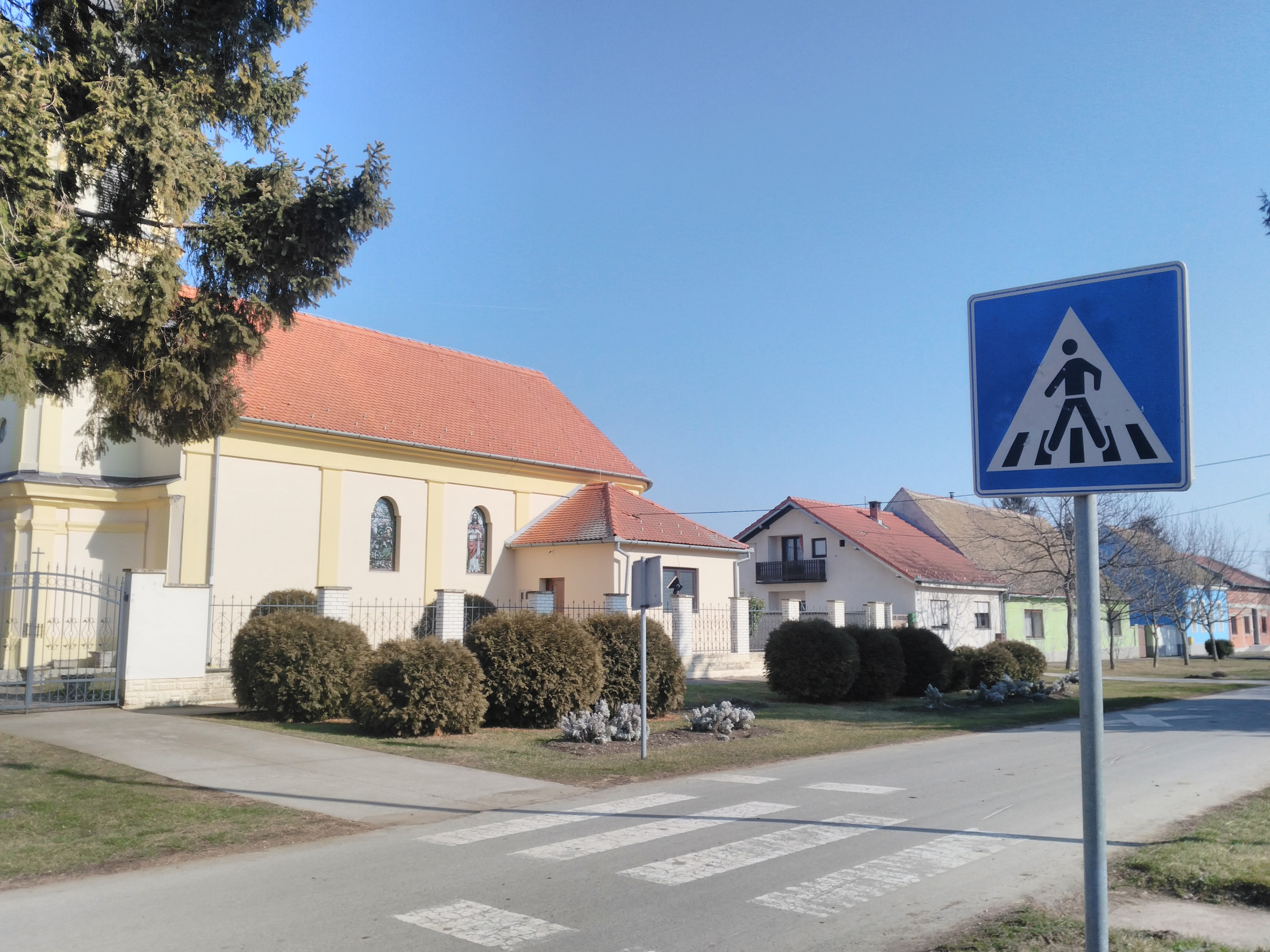

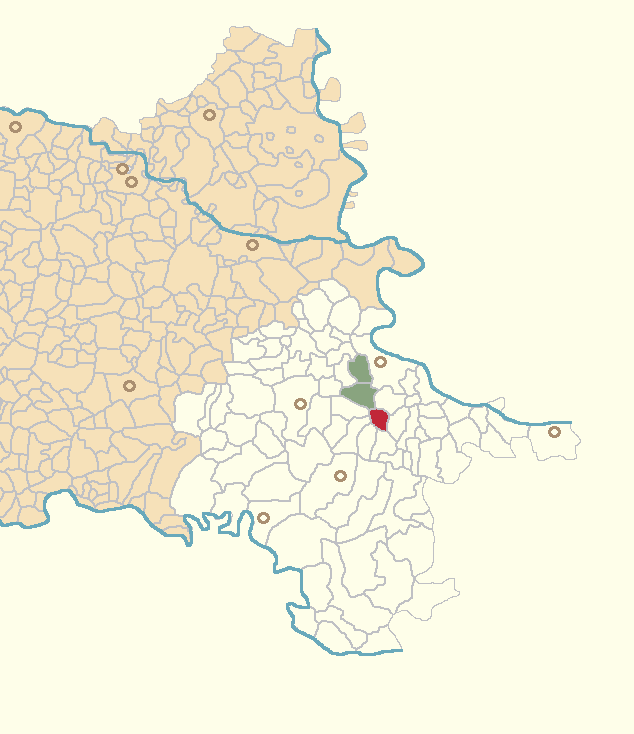
- Country: Croatia
- Region: Syrmia (Podunavlje)
- County: Vukovar-Syrmia
- Municipality: Bogdanovci

Area
  - Total: 4.9 sq mi (12.6 km^{2})

Population (2021)
  - Total: 288
  - Density: 59.2/sq mi (22.9/km^{2})
- Time zone: UTC+1 (CET)
  - Summer (DST): UTC+2 (CEST)

Svinjarevci is a settlement in Vukovar-Syrmia County, Croatia. It is located southwest of the city of Vukovar along state road D57. It is composed of 7 streets.

== Name ==
The past worker of a local school claims that from old pre-90s war records on today's village territory there was a big acorn forest in which local people would build farms and breed pigs. For some of those people, it was too far to travel to easily, so they slowly one by one started to move in. Little by little, they built houses and after some time, the whole village was built, with the name Svinjarevci. But before, Svinjarevci was on the land of "Svetinje", which is proven by artefacts dug out on its territory.

== History ==
During the Turkish conquest between the 15th and 18th centuries, Svinjarevci was under a Njemci, and in records of 1570, it was called "Isvinarevçi", with 20 mostly Turkish households. During this time there are records of the village moving, as mentioned in "Ime section". After the Turkish expulsion, the village became empty and poor. Following Ottoman retreat from the region, the Lordship of Vukovar was established, and the village became part of its domain. Later, there was an emigration of Germans from "Bačka" and "šokaca" from Bosnia. Between 1944 and 1945, Germans were forced out of the village because of ethnic cleansing, caused by Partisans overthrowing the government. Empty houses of then-Germans were given to mostly Serbs from Dalmatia, which many of them still live in the village to this today. In the 1960s Bosnians started to come into the village.

== Population ==
The earliest records of population date back to 1857. The village population keeps growing until 1971, when the number of people drops from 912 to 750. After light growth in 1991, there is a start of Serbian aggression and the village population has plummeting ever since.

== Groups and organizations ==
DVD Svinjarevci - Created in 1928. it is Volunteering Fire Department Hunting group Fazan - Created 1947. KUD Dukat Svinjarevci - Created 1974. at first its name was "Bratstvo I Jedinstvo". During war it changed to "KUD dukati". In 2020 it was shut down. ŠRU Čikov Svinjarevci - Created 2011. it is based around fishing. Women's group Svinjarevci.

== Sport ==
In 1950, Svinjarevci football club was created with the name "Mladost Svinjarevci". The next year, the club creates its first football tournament with then luxury "leather ball". The club was briefly shut down in the year 2008, but came back in 2010, when it continued its matches in 3 ŽNL.
