= Kopački Rit =

Nature park in eastern Croatia

- Park prirode Kopački rit Kopački Rit Nature Park
- IUCN category V (protected landscape/seascape)
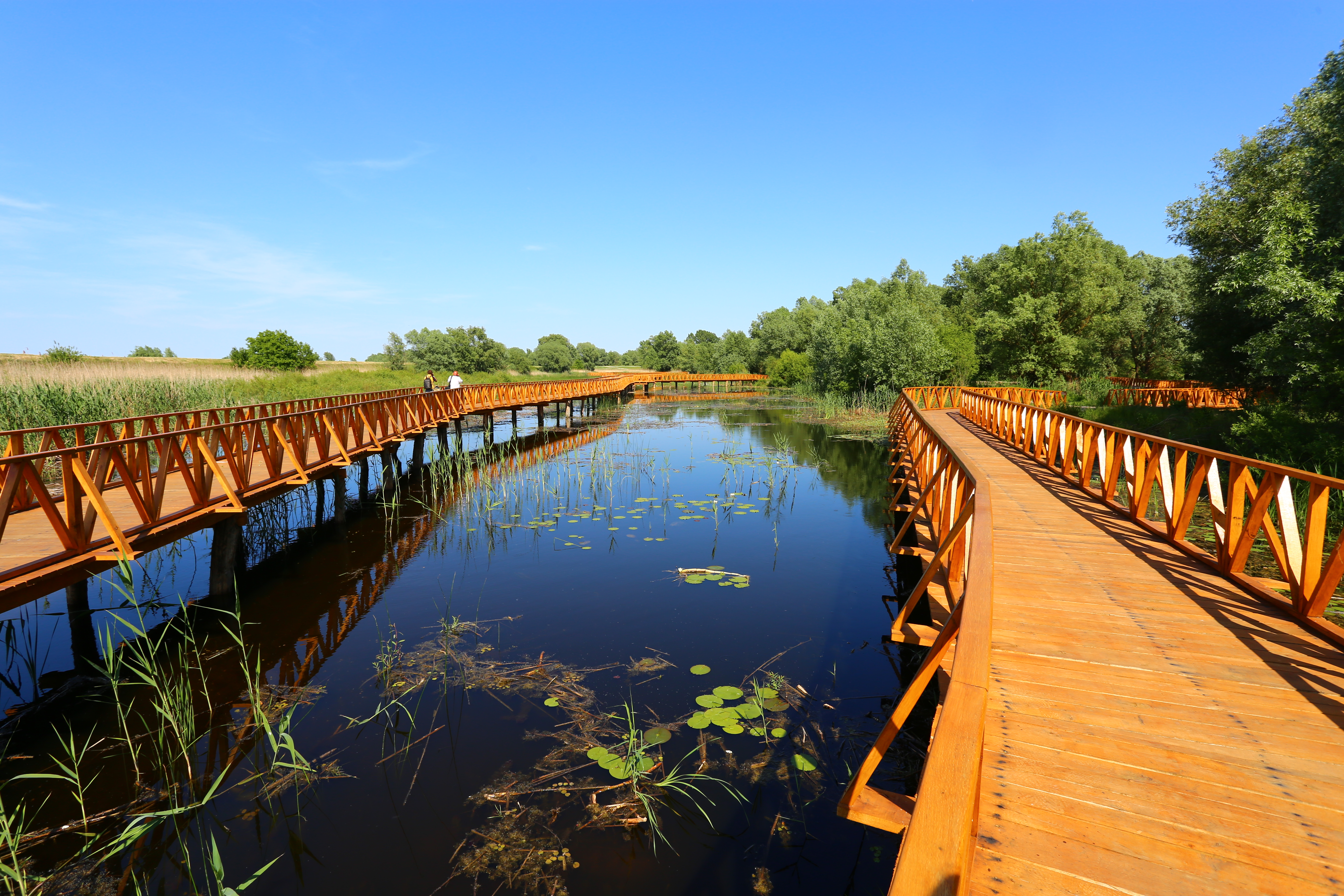
- Wooden trail through Kopački rit

- Location within Osijek-Baranja County
- Location: Podunavlje
- Nearest city: Osijek
- Coordinates: 45.602°N 18.786°E
- Area: 177 km^{2} (68 sq mi)
- Established: 1976
- Administrator: State Institute for Nature Protection

Ramsar Wetland
- Official name: Nature Park Kopački rit
- Designated: 2 March 1993
- Reference no.: 583

Map

Kopački Rit is a nature park in eastern Croatia in the municipalities of Bilje and Kneževi Vinogradi. It is located northwest of the confluence of the Drava and the Danube, situated at the border with Serbia. It comprises many backwaters and ponds along the Danube. It is one of the most important, largest and most attractive preserved intact wetlands in Europe.

== Fauna & Flora ==
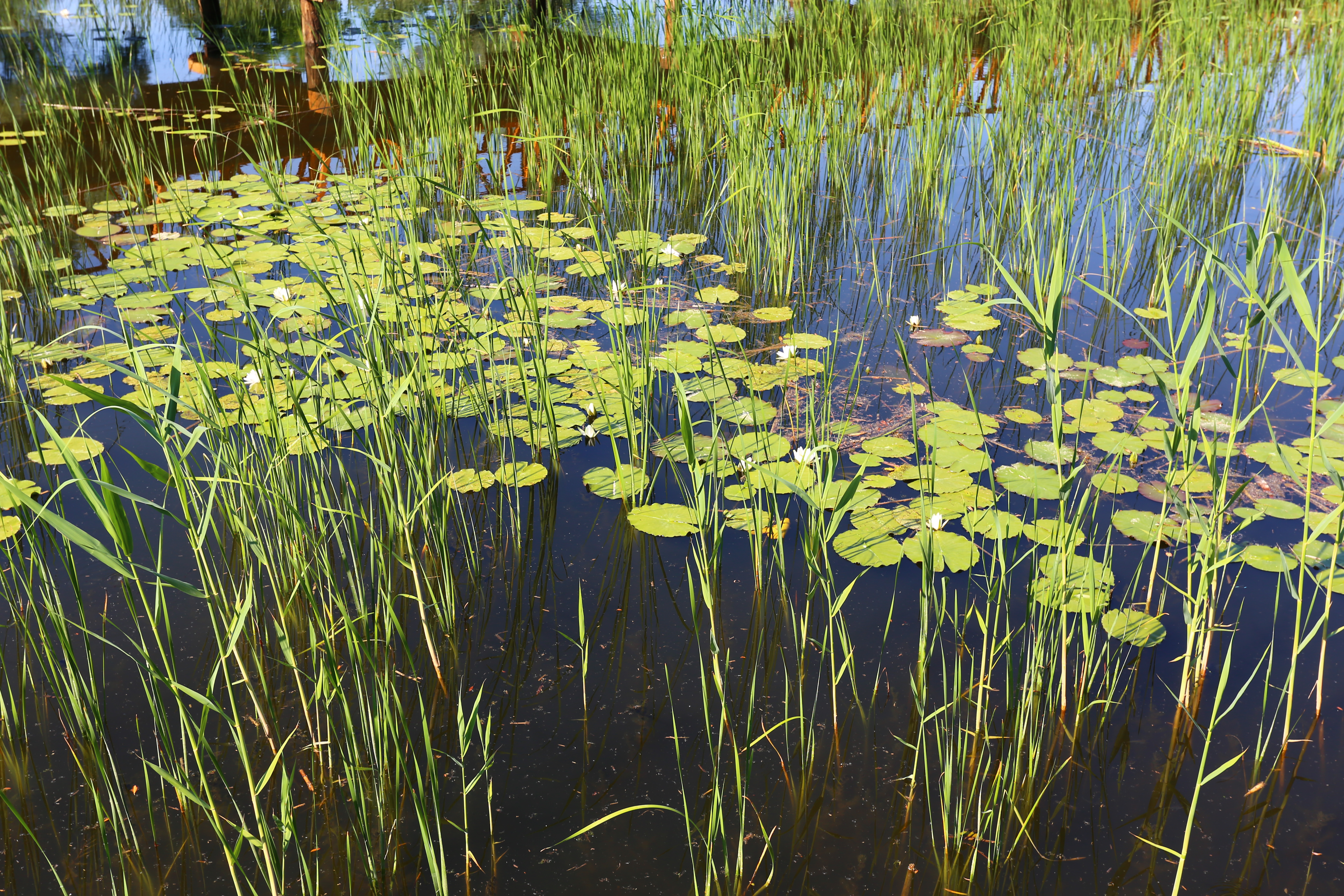
Kopački rit water lilies and reeds

A part of Kopački Rit has been designated as a zoological reserve. Around 260 various bird species breed here including geese and ducks, great white egret, white stork, black stork, white-tailed eagle, crows, Eurasian coot, gulls, terns, common kingfisher and European green woodpecker. Many other species use this area as a temporary shelter on migration from the northern, cooler regions to the southern, warmer areas and vice versa.

There are around 40 fish species including pike, ide, tench, bream, carp, catfish, pike-perch and perch. Mammals in the area include red deer, roe deer, wild boar, European wildcat, pine marten, stone marten, least weasel, sable and the Eurasian otter. Daily passes can be purchased at the visitors center.

Kopački Rit also has over 140 recorded species of plant—some of which are very rare and only found in a few places in Croatia. Notable species include white water lily (Nymphaea alba), the iris (Iris variegata); azola, black sedge (Carex nigra), common reed (Phragmites australis); siberian cattail; graceful cattail (Typha laxmannii); and flowering rush (Butomus umbellatus).

== Climate ==
Between 2004 and 2019, the highest temperature recorded at the local weather station at an elevation of 83 metres (272 ft) was 39.1 °C (102.4 °F), on 6 August 2012. The coldest temperature was −25.1 °C (−13.2 °F), on 9 February 2012.

== Access ==
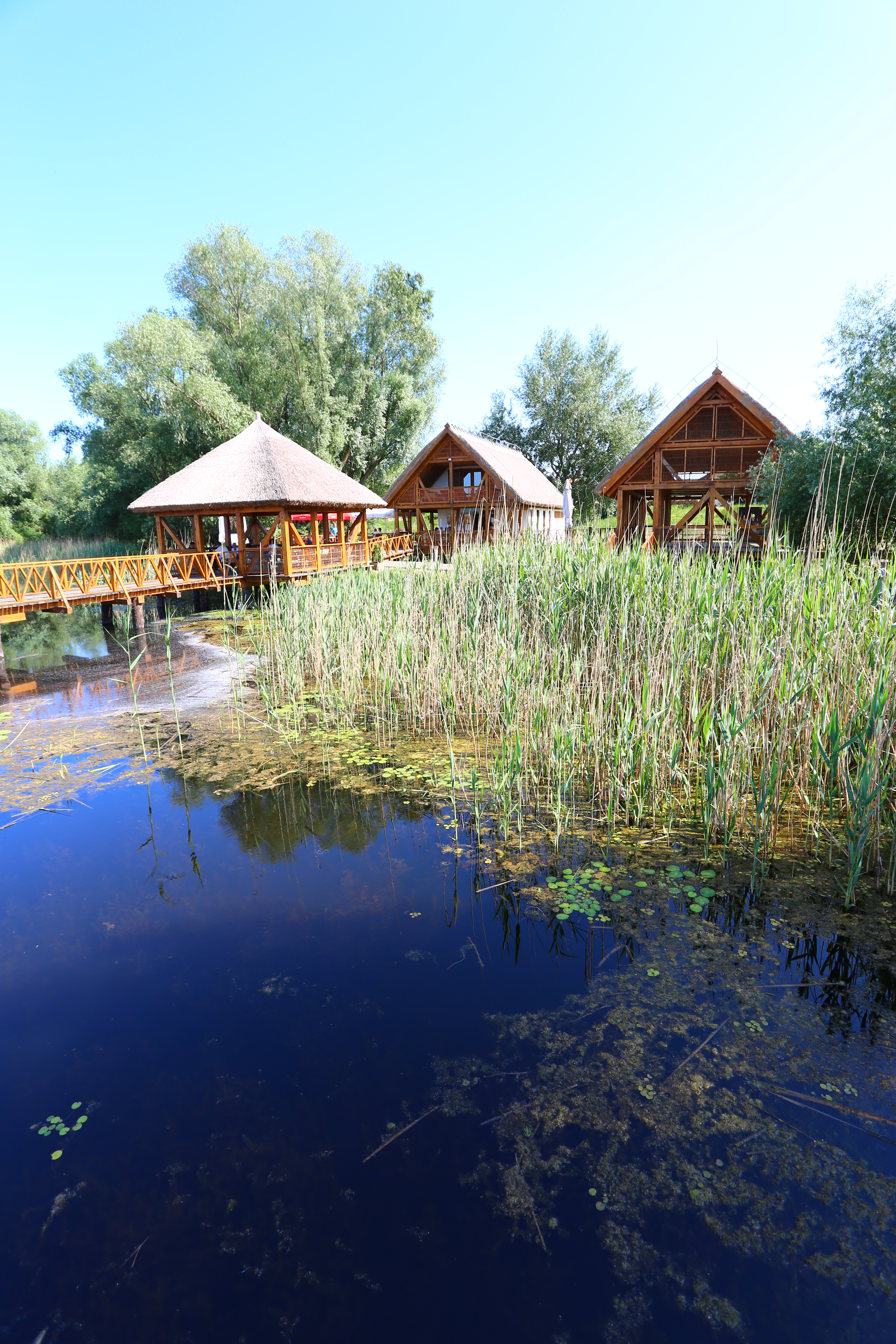
Kopački Rit Cafe and visitors center

The proximity of the big town of Osijek and its surroundings, as well as excellent communications (by road, railway, plane and ship) provide ready access to visitors. The beauty of "intact" nature, the multitude of waters, flora and fauna attract not only excursionists and visitors but also many experts and scientists from the whole of Europe.

Guided tourist visits by panoramic ships, boats, horse-drawn wagons or on foot are available. Some packages offer the possibility of photographing or video-recording animals, birds in particular.

Angling and hunting are allowed in certain parts of Kopački Rit that are put under less strict protection such as Vemeljski Dunavac, Danube river, Podunavlje channels, and the area by the Zlatna Greda pump station.

The international bicycle routes "Pannonian Peace Route" and "Danube Route" lead through Kopački Rit, which has become the first centre for cycle-tourists in Croatia. Bikes are also available for rent through the visitors center.

== See also ==
- Ekološko društvo Zeleni Osijek
- Kopačevo
- List of protected areas of Croatia
