= Podunavlje =

Part of the Danube river basin

Podunavlje (Serbian Cyrillic: Подунавље) is the name of the Danube river basin parts located in Croatia (Slavonia, Syrmia, and Baranya) and Serbia (Bačka, Syrmia, Belgrade, Banat, Braničevo, and Ključ). Podunavlje is located on the southern edge of Pannonian Basin. In its wider meaning, the Serbo-Croatian term refers to the area around the entire flow of the river Danube.

== Etymology ==
In the first half of the 18th century, Sava-Danube (Posavina-Podunavlje) section of the Habsburg Military Frontier existed in the area. Podunavlje segment of the Frontier comprised parts of southern Bačka and northern Syrmia including towns of Petrovaradin, Šid, Bačka Palanka, Bački Petrovac, Petrovaradinski Šanac (Novi Sad), and Titel.

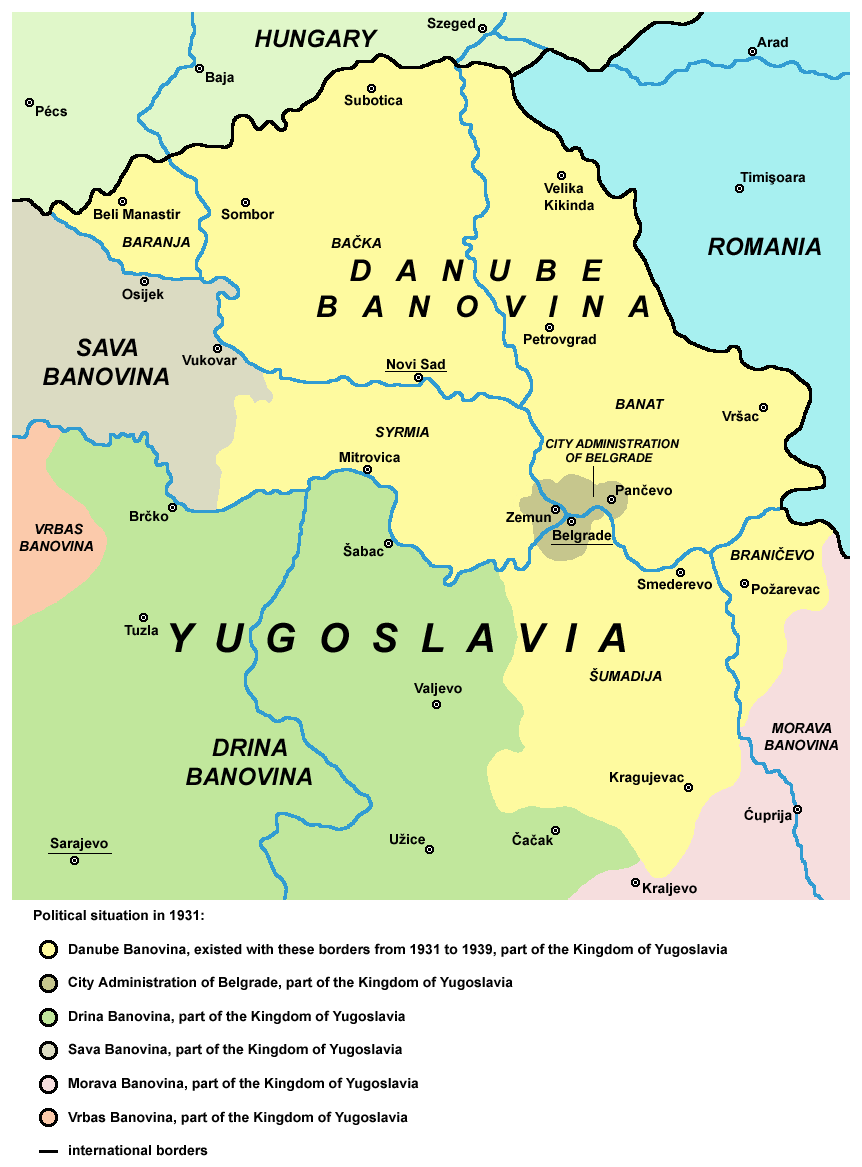
Danube Banovina map

Between 1922 and 1929, Podunavlje Oblast was one of the administrative units of the Kingdom of Serbs, Croats and Slovenes. It included parts of Šumadija and Banat regions and its seat was in Smederevo. Between 1929 and 1941, one of the provinces of the Kingdom of Yugoslavia was known as the Danube Banovina. The province consisted of the geographical regions of Syrmia, Bačka, Banat, Baranya, Šumadija, and Braničevo. The capital city of the Danube Banovina was Novi Sad. In 1941, the World War II Axis powers occupied the province. Bačka and Baranya regions were attached to Miklós Horthy's Hungary, while Syrmia was attached to the Independent State of Croatia. The remaining rump Danube Banovina (including Banat, Šumadija, and Braničevo) existed as part of German-occupied Serbia until the end of 1941 with its capital at Smederevo. Today, Smederevo is seat of the Podunavlje District of Serbia.

Between 1980 and 1989, Podunavlje was a name of one of the former seven municipalities of [mthe City of Novi Sad .

Eastern Slavonia, Baranya and Western Syrmia (1991–1998), the eastern portion of the Republic of Serbian Krajina, was sometimes called 'Podunavska Krajina' by Serbs or 'Croatian Podunavlje' by Croats.

== Cities and towns ==
List of cities and towns located on the river Danube in Podunavlje.

Serbia:

| City / town | Status | Location | Population (2011) |
|---|---|---|---|
| Apatin | municipality seat | West Bačka District | 17,352 |
| Bačka Palanka | municipality seat | South Bačka District | 27,924 |
| Beočin | center of municipality | South Bačka District | 7,800 |
| Novi Sad | administrative center of South Bačka District | South Bačka District | 221,854 |
| Sremska Kamenica | town | South Bačka District | 11,967 |
| Petrovaradin | municipality seat | South Bačka District | 14,298 |
| Sremski Karlovci | municipality seat | Srem District | 8,722 |
| Zemun (part of Belgrade) | municipality seat | City of Belgrade | 151,811 |
| Belgrade (including Zemun) | capital of Serbia | City of Belgrade | 1,135,502 |
| Pančevo | administrative center of South Banat District | South Banat District | 73,992 |
| Smederevo | administrative center of Podunavlje District | Podunavlje District | 63,028 |
| Kovin | municipality seat | South Banat District | 13,499 |
| Kostolac | municipality seat | Braničevo District | 9,264 |
| Veliko Gradište | municipality seat | Braničevo District | 5,868 |
| Kladovo | municipality seat | Bor District | 8,913 |

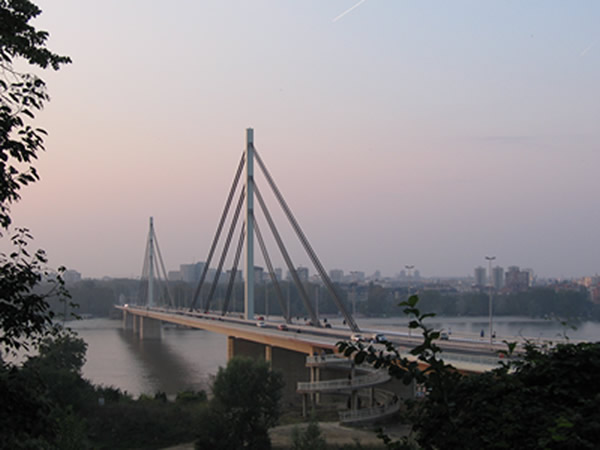
Freedom Bridge across the Danube, Novi Sad

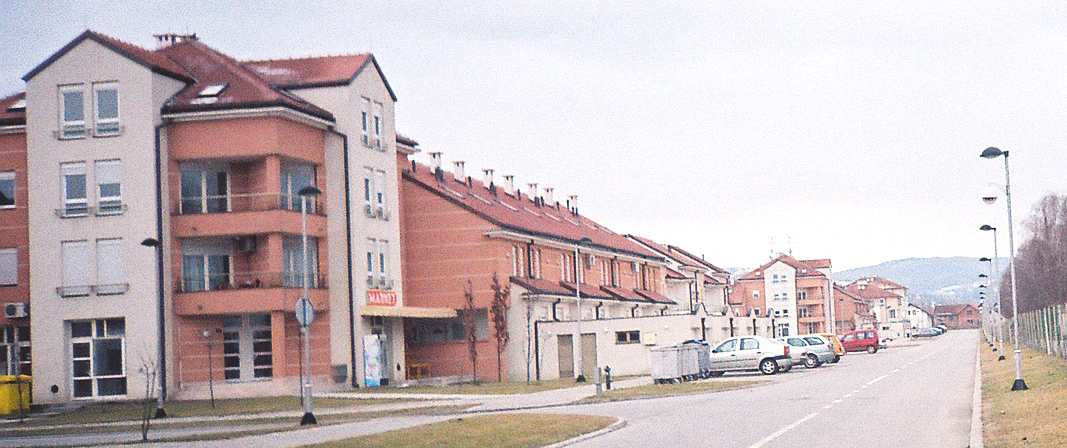
Veternik

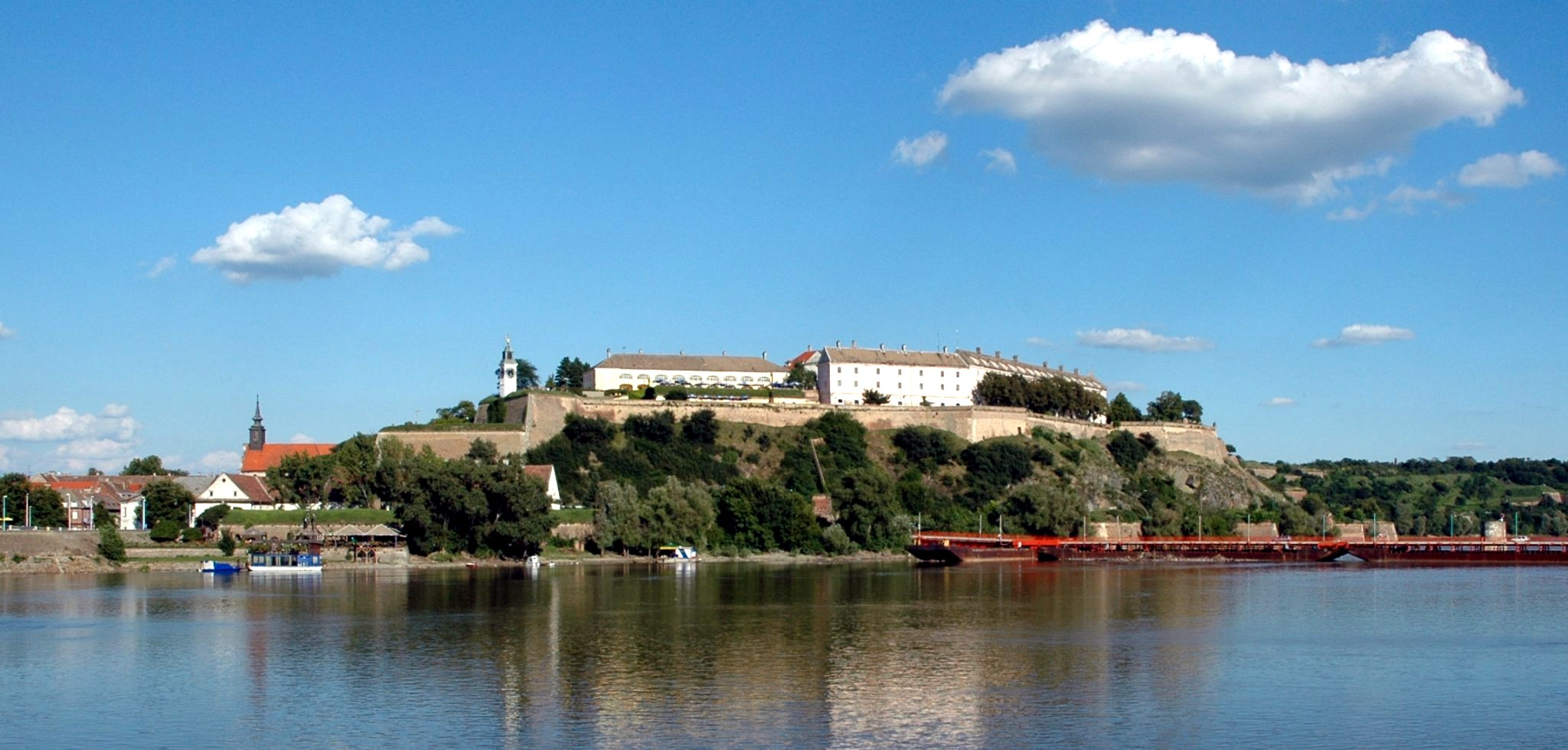
Petrovaradin fortress

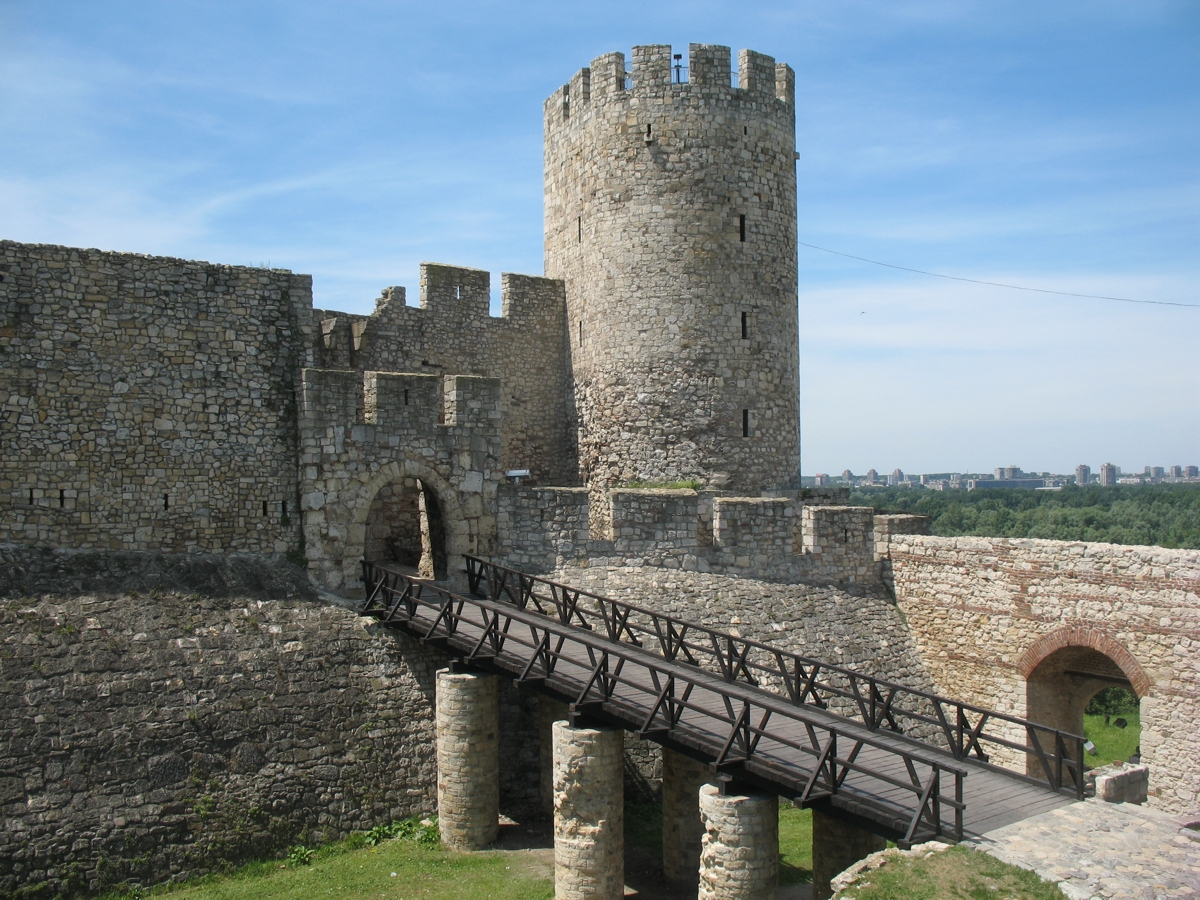
Kalemegdan, Belgrade

Croatia:

| City / town | Status | Location | Population (2021) |
|---|---|---|---|
| Beli Manastir | town | Osijek-Baranja County | 7,973 |
| Vukovar | city, center of Vukovar-Srijem County | Vukovar-Syrmia County | 23,175 |
| Ilok | town | Vukovar-Syrmia County | 5,045 |

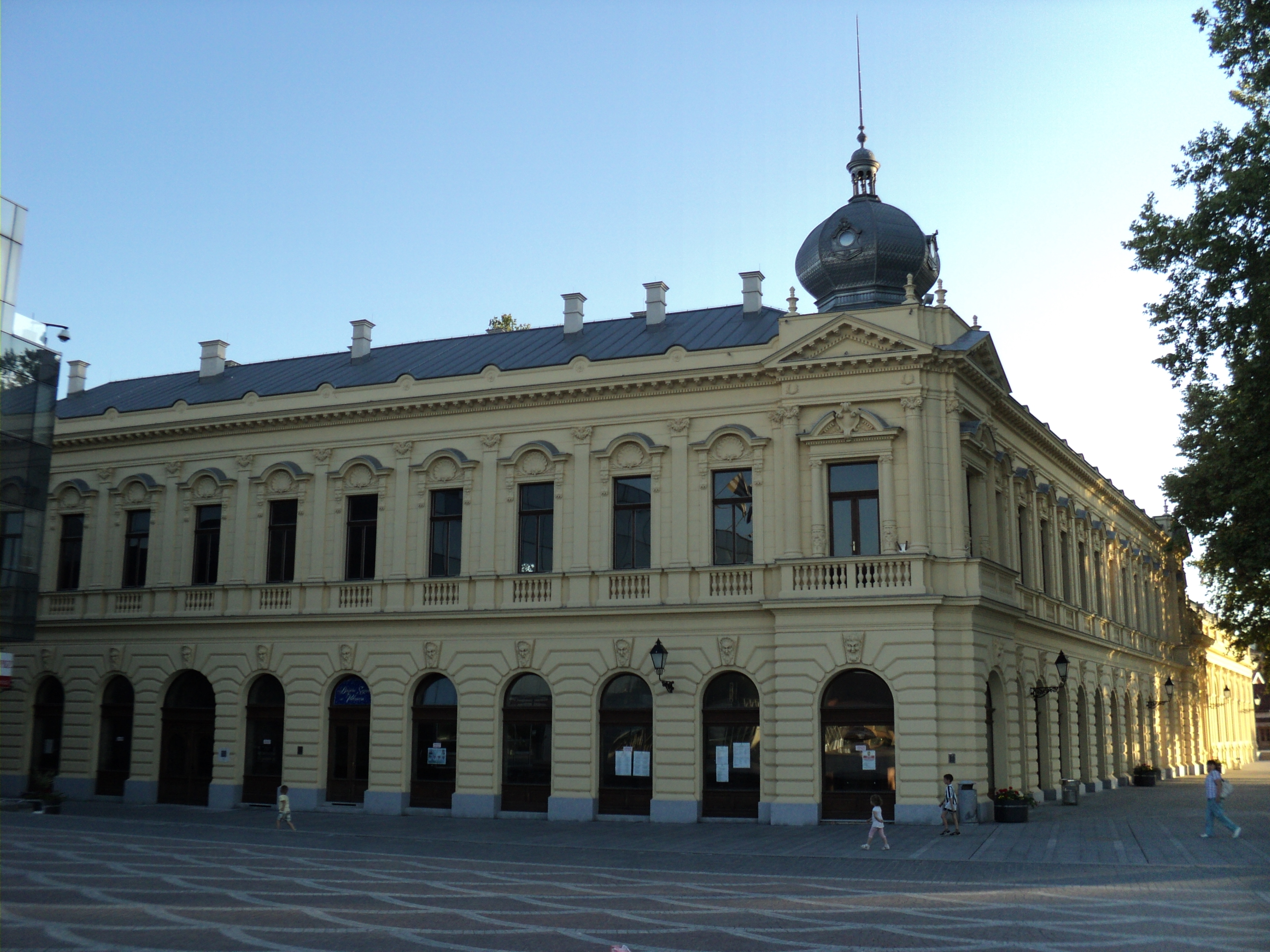
Vukovar

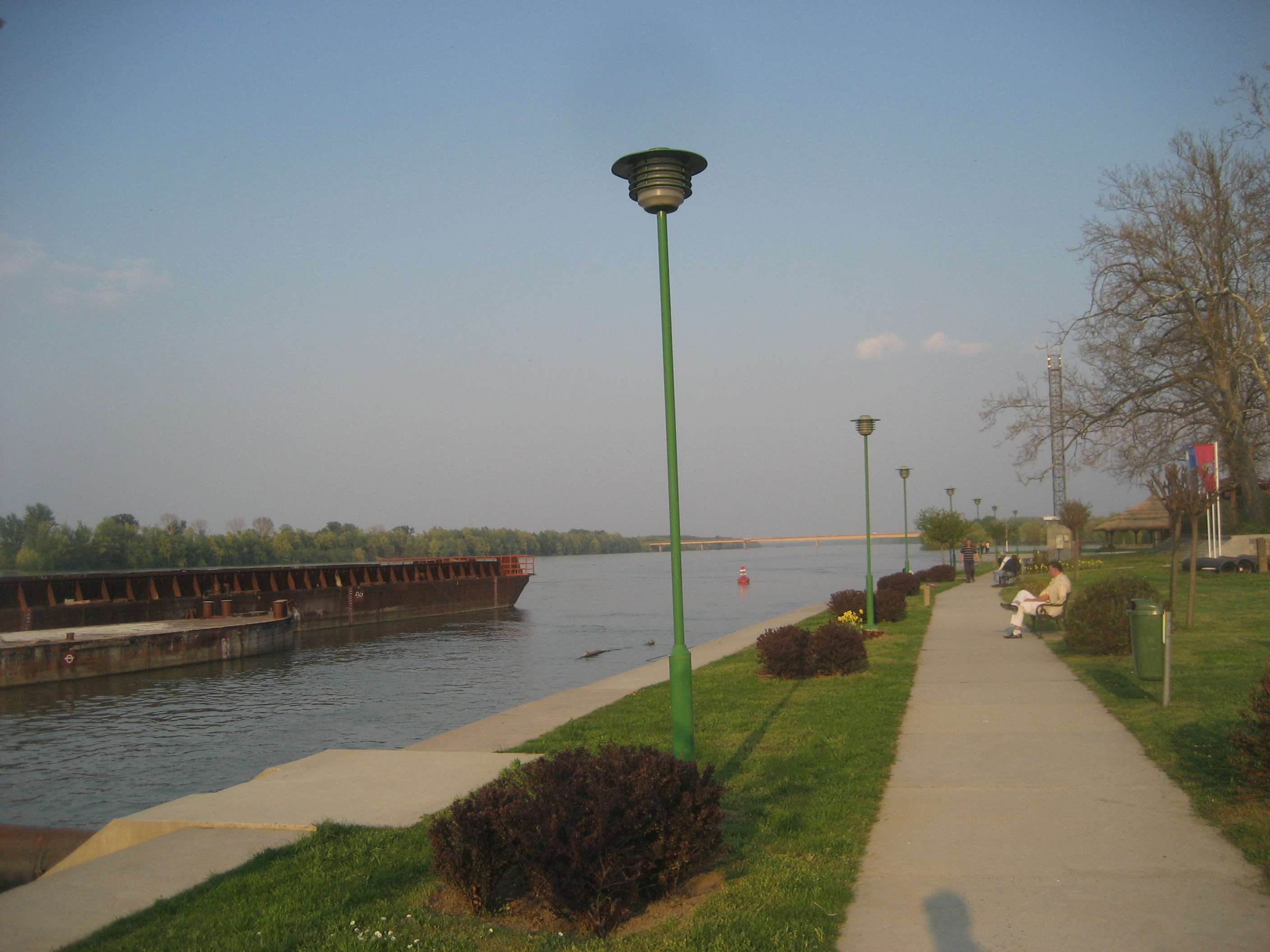
Danube, Ilok

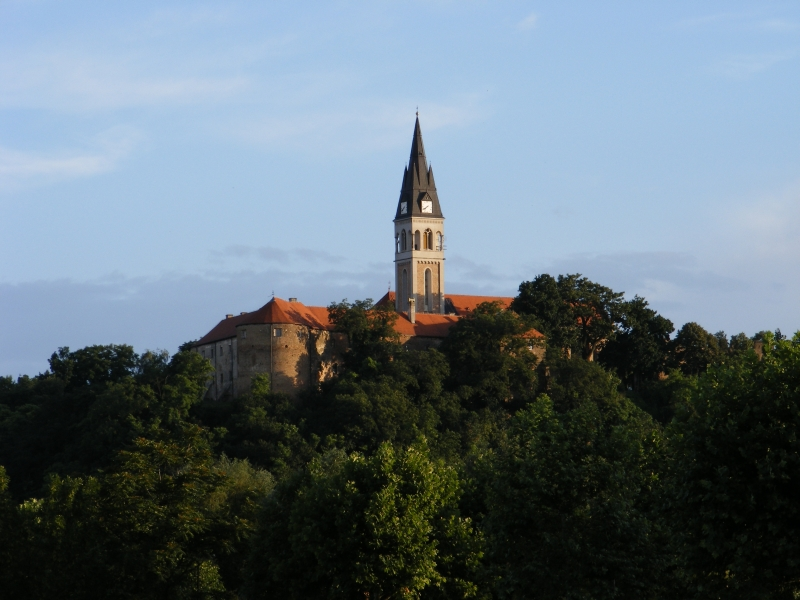
Ilok

== Municipalities ==
List of municipal areas connected to the river Danube in Podunavlje.

Serbia:

| Municipality / City | Location | Population (2011) |
|---|---|---|
| City of Sombor | West Bačka District | 85,569 |
| Municipality of Apatin | West Bačka District | 28,654 |
| Municipality of Odžaci | West Bačka District | 30,196 |
| Municipality of Bač | South Bačka District | 14,150 |
| Municipality of Bačka Palanka | South Bačka District | 55,361 |
| Municipality of Bački Petrovac | South Bačka District | 13,302 |
| Municipality of Beočin | South Bačka District | 15,630 |
| City of Novi Sad | South Bačka District | 335,701; 301,968; 33,733 |
| Municipality of Sremski Karlovci | Srem District | 8,722 |
| Municipality of Inđija | Srem District | 47,204 |
| Municipality of Titel | South Bačka District | 15,554 |
| City of Zrenjanin | Central Banat District | 122,714 |
| Municipality of Stara Pazova | Srem District | 65,508 |
| City of Belgrade; *Municipality of Zemun; *Municipality of Palilula; *Municipality of Stari Grad; *Municipality of Grocka | Belgrade | 1,639,121; 166,292; 170,593; 48,061; 83,398 |
| City of Pančevo | South Banat District | 122,252 |
| City of Smederevo | Podunavlje District | 107,528 |
| Municipality of Kovin | South Banat District | 33,725 |
| City of Požarevac; *Municipality of Požarevac; *Municipality of Kostolac | Braničevo District | 74,070; 60,466; 13,604 |
| Municipality of Bela Crkva | South Banat District | 17,285 |
| Municipality of Veliko Gradište | Braničevo District | 17,559 |
| Municipality of Golubac | Braničevo District | 8,161 |
| Municipality of Majdanpek | Bor District | 18,179 |
| Municipality of Kladovo | Bor District | 20,635 |
| Municipality of Negotin | Zaječar District | 36,879 |

Croatia:

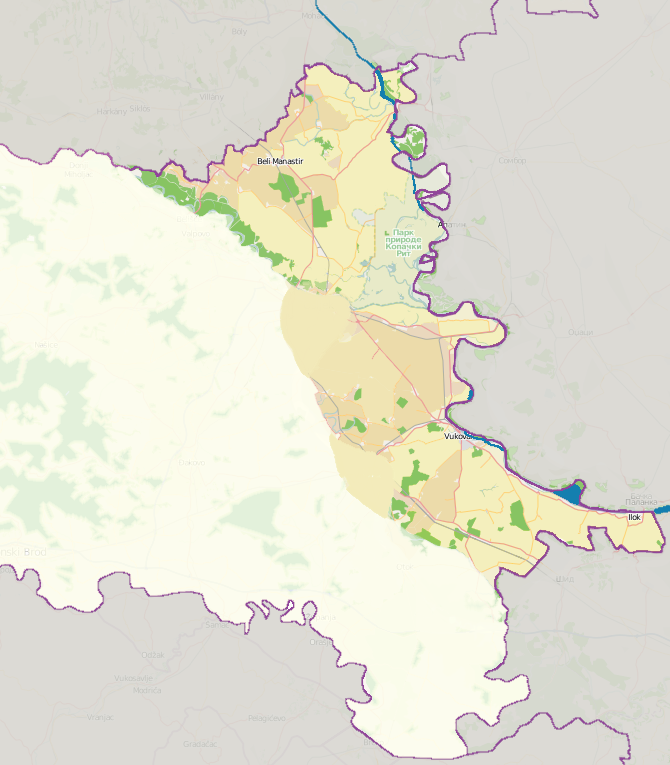
Croatian Podunavlje region.

| Municipality / City | Location | Population (2021) |
|---|---|---|
| Municipality of Antunovac | Osijek-Baranja County | 3,411 |
| Municipality of Bilje | Osijek-Baranja County | 4,772 |
| Municipality of Borovo | Vukovar-Syrmia County | 3,555 |
| Municipality of Bogdanovci | Vukovar-Syrmia County | 1,545 |
| Municipality of Markušica | Vukovar-Syrmia County | 1,773 |
| Municipality of Negoslavci | Vukovar-Syrmia County | 983 |
| Municipality of Nuštar | Vukovar-Syrmia County | 4,861 |
| Municipality of Stari Jankovci | Vukovar-Syrmia County | 3,271 |
| Municipality of Tordinci | Vukovar-Syrmia County | 1,657 |
| Municipality of Tovarnik | Vukovar-Srijem County | 2,067 |
| Municipality of Trpinja | Vukovar-Syrmia County | 4,167 |
| Municipality of Draž | Osijek-Baranja County | 1,949 |
| Municipality of Erdut | Osijek-Baranja County | 5,436 |
| Municipality of Ernestinovo | Osijek-Baranja County | 1,948 |
| Municipality of Kneževi Vinogradi | Osijek-Baranja County | 3,357 |
| Municipality of Šodolovci | Osijek-Baranja County | 1,217 |
| Municipality of Petlovac | Osijek-Baranja County | 1,874 |
| Municipality of Popovac | Osijek-Baranja County | 1,446 |
| Municipality of Čeminac | Osijek-Baranja County | 2,484 |
| Municipality of Darda | Osijek-Baranja County | 5,427 |
| Municipality of Lovas | Vukovar-Syrmia County | 980 |

== Podunavlje in Serbia ==
=== Geography and demographics ===
Northern part of Serbian Podunavlje is mostly flat, while southern part is mostly mountainous. Important rivers in Serbian Podunavlje that flowing into Danube are Tisa, Sava, Tamiš, and Morava. Two largest cities of Serbia, Belgrade and Novi Sad, are located in Podunavlje. Podunavlje includes parts of several traditional geographical regions in Serbia. Such are Bačka, Banat, Syrmia, Šumadija, Braničevo, and the Timok Valley.

Serbian Podunavlje is mainly populated by Serbs, while other smaller ethnic groups in the area are Slovaks, Hungarians, Croats, Rusyns, Romanians and Vlachs, Romani people, etc. Slovaks forming the majority of population in the municipality of Bački Petrovac, which is located near the Danube, in Bačka. Main religion in the area is Orthodox Christianity, while other smaller religious groups are Catholics, Protestants and Muslims.

=== History ===
Podunavlje region in Serbia was an area where several important prehistoric cultures flourished, notably the Lepenski Vir culture, the Starčevo culture, the Vinča culture, the Kostolac culture, the Vatin culture, the Belegiš culture, etc. It was also a core of the Tribal State of Celtic Scordisci, which had its capital in Singidunum (present-day Belgrade). Serbian Podunavlje was also a border region of Roman Empire and there are archaeological remnants of Roman civilization in the area.

In the Migration Period and the Middle Ages, the region was part of the Eastern Roman Empire, the Hunnic Empire, the Ostrogothic Kingdom, the Kingdom of the Gepids, the Lombard State, the Avar Khaganate, the Frankish Empire, the Bulgarian Empire, the Principality of Lower Pannonia, the Great Moravia, and the Kingdom of Hungary.

Although, Serbo-Croatian speaking South Slavs settled in Serbian Podunavlje in the 6th century, Serbian state did not reach the river Danube before the 13th century. Kingdom of Syrmia ruled by Serb king Stefan Dragutin (1284–1316) included southern Podunavlje and had its capitals in Debrc and Belgrade. The southern Podunavlje was subsequently included into other medieval Serbian states, notably the Serbian Empire, the Moravian Serbia and the Serbian Despotate. The Serbian Despotate had its capitals in Podunavlje, notably in Belgrade and Smederevo. After the Ottoman conquest of Serbian Despotate in 1459, Serbian statehood was temporarily restored in northern Podunavlje (northern Bačka) between 1526 and 1530, during the reigns of emperor Jovan Nenad and duke Radoslav Čelnik.

In the 16th century, the whole region was included into the Ottoman Empire. Subsequently, it became an area disputed between the Ottoman Empire and the Habsburg monarchy. After the Treaty of Belgrade from 1739 which defined the Habsburg-Ottoman border in Podunavlje, the region, as well as the local Serb people, became divided between the two empires. In both these areas, Serb people fought for their autonomy and independence. After the First and Second Serbian Uprising (in 1804 and 1815), an autonomous Ottoman Principality of Serbia was created in the south, while after the Serbian Uprising in Vojvodina (in 1848–1849), an autonomous Austrian Voivodeship of Serbia and Banat of Temeschwar was created in the north. The two autonomous areas, however, did not have the same fate; while the northern voivodeship was abolished in 1860, the southern principality gained full independence in 1878 and was transformed into the Kingdom of Serbia in 1882. In 1918, after the Habsburg defeat in the World War I, the northern Podunavlje was also included into the Kingdom of Serbia, which subsequently became part of the Kingdom of Serbs, Croats and Slovenes (later renamed to Yugoslavia). Since 2006, the whole region is part of an independent Serbia.

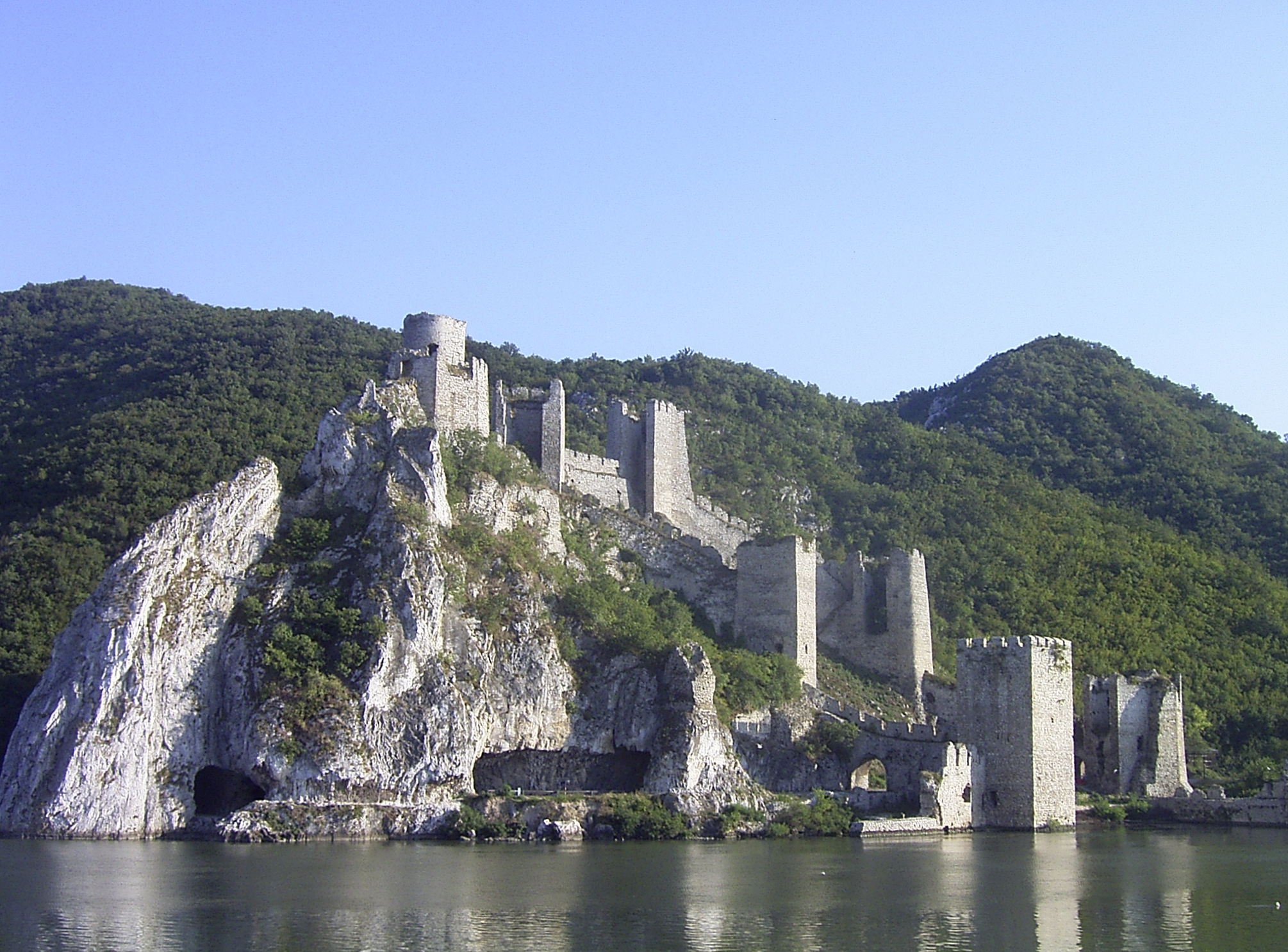
Golubac Fortress

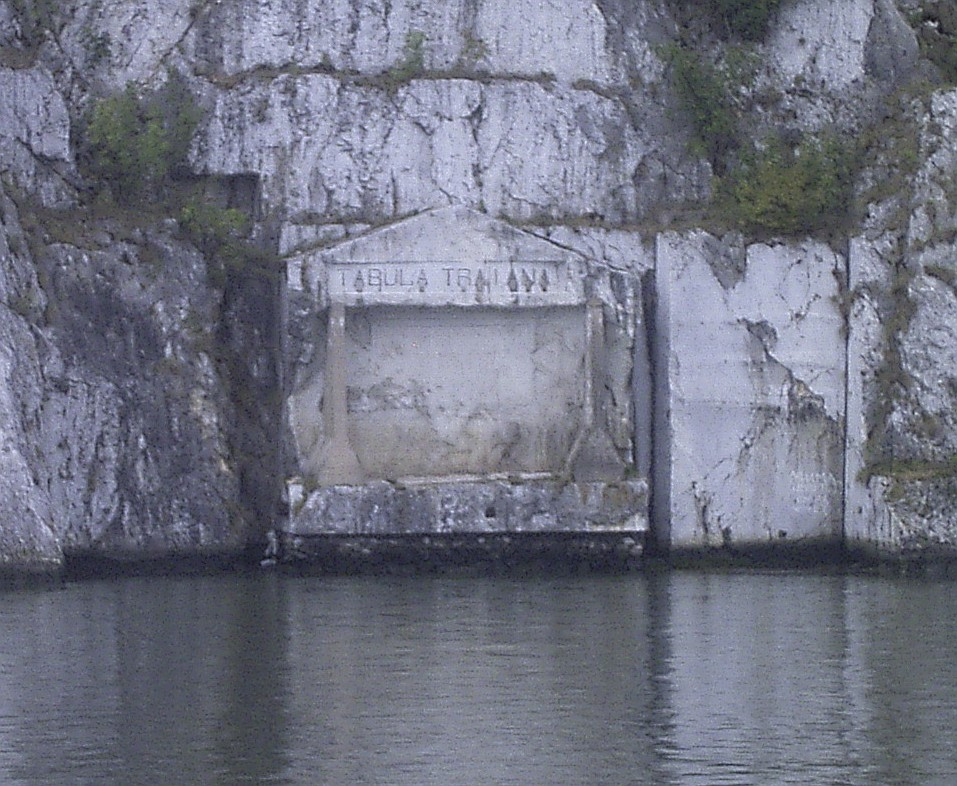
Tabula Traiana near Kladovo

== Podunavlje in Croatia ==
=== Geography and demographics ===
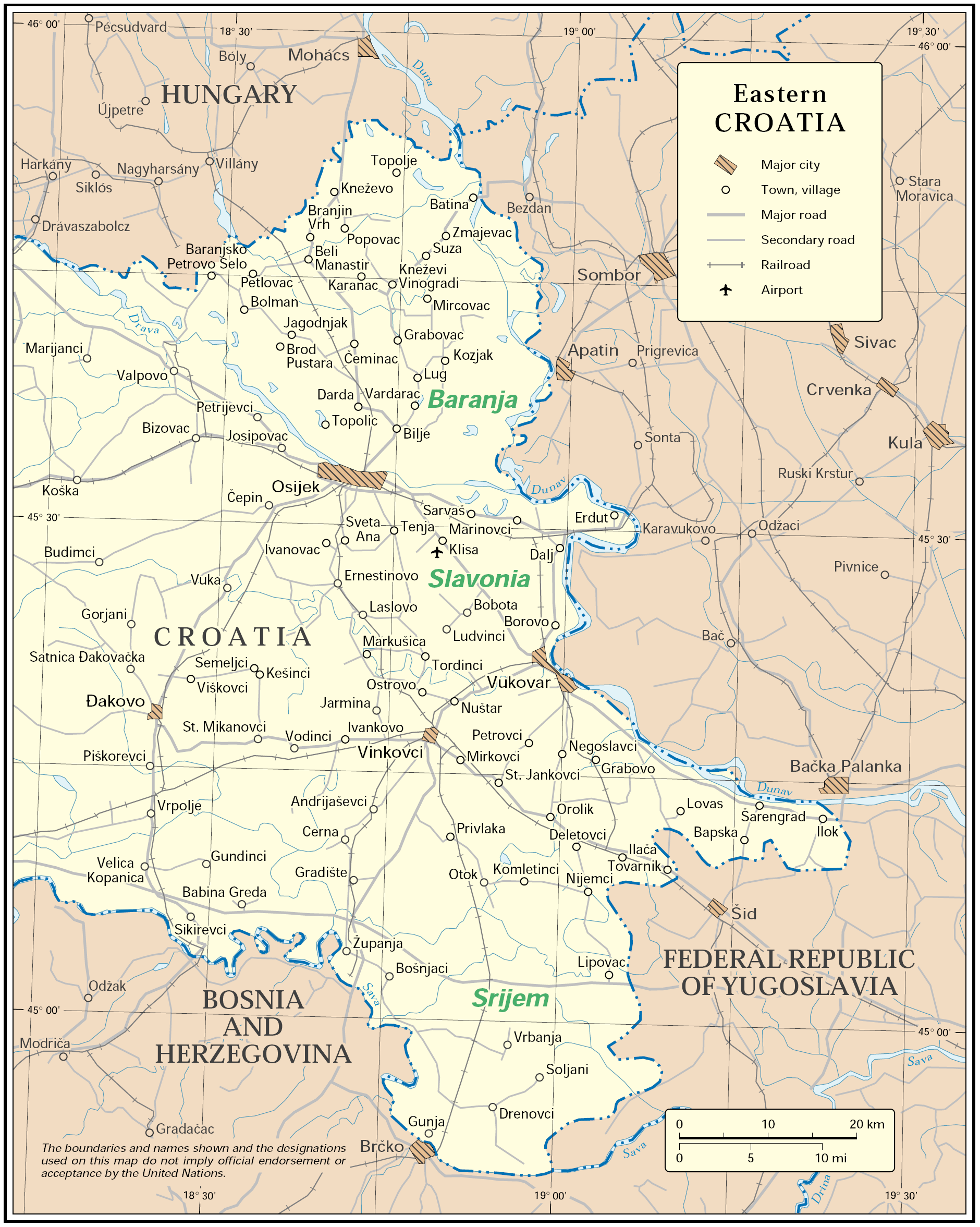
Podunavlje in Croatia

In Croatia, region is elongated in a north–south along the Danube which is border river between Croatia and Serbia. On the north region bordering with Hungary and on west continues to Slavonia, Syrmia and Baranya and rest of Croatia. The region is extremely flat with an average altitude of 80–110 meters. Coendures of Croatian Podunavlje are approximately overlapping with the territory of pre-War territory of Yugoslav municipalities Beli Manastir, Osijek, Vinkovci and Vukovar. Those four municipalities had a territory of 3.436 kilometres and constituted 6.1% of territory of Socialist Republic of Croatia. In 1991 mentioned municipalities had 402,152 inhabitants living in 157 settlements and they constituted 8.4% of population of Croatia at the time. After the collapse of Yugoslavia, local government system in Croatia was significantly changed and today Croatian Podunavlje in widest sense can be described as a region that is overlapping with the territory of Vukovar-Syrmia and Osijek-Baranja counties. In this sense region include the gravitation regions of towns of Našice and Županja and is significantly bigger and cover the area of 6,597 sq km or 11.7% of territory of Croatia with 348 settlements and 598,434 inhabitants in 1991 (12.5% of total population of Croatia at that time).

Climate in the region can be described as Continental climate with warm and hot summers and cold winters. Temperature ranges in Podunavlje are higher than in rest of Croatia due to the continent influence. Also level of rainfall is therefore lower than in the rest of Croatia.

It is one of the ethnically heterogeneous areas in Croatia. The largest ethnic group are Croats, after them follow Serbs and Hungarians, as well as some smaller ethnic groups such as Pannonian Rusyns, Slovaks, Ukrainians, Romani people, Germans, etc. Croats constitute an absolute majority of people in Podunavlje, while Serbs make up largest ethnic minority. Hungarians are third ethnic group by number and mostly live in area of Baranya. Pannonian Rusyns live mainly in Petrovci and Mikluševci. More than one-fifth of total number of Slovaks in country live in Ilok.

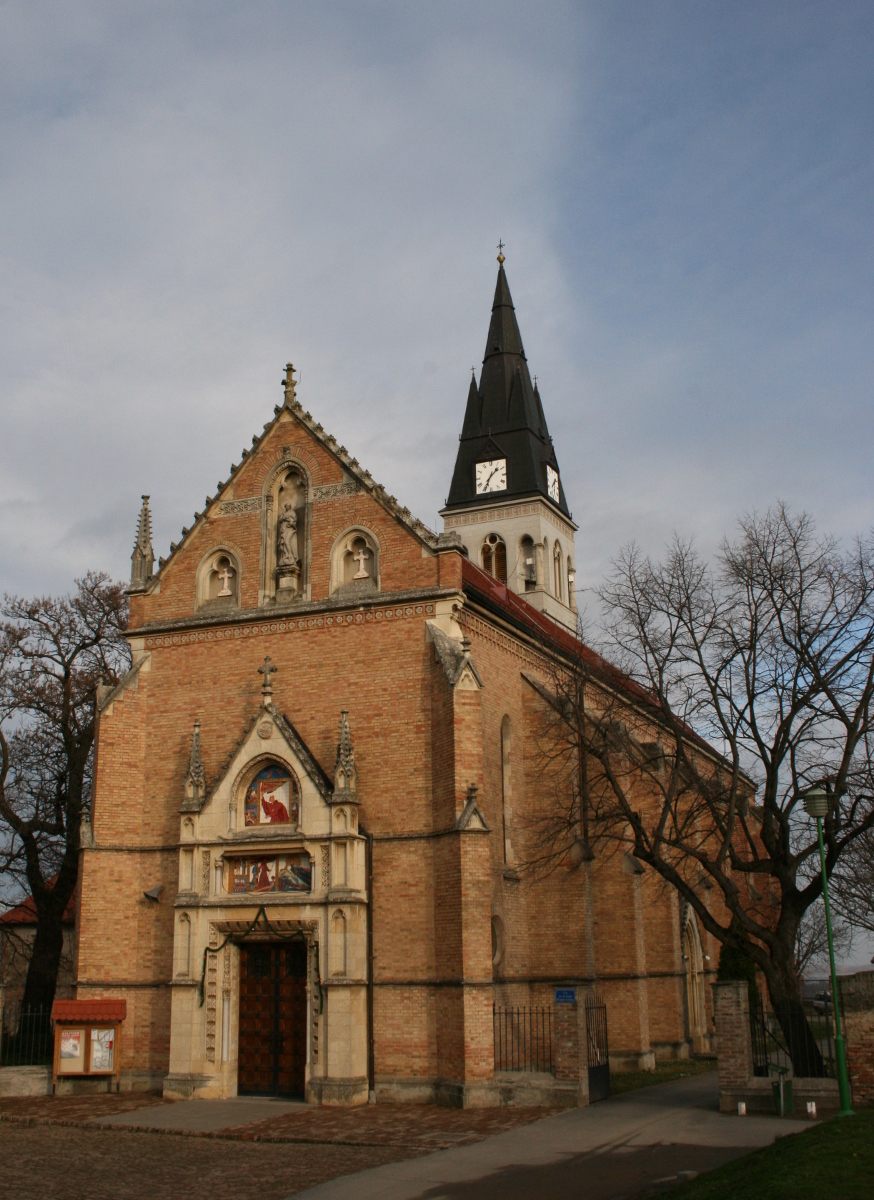
Catholic church in Ilok

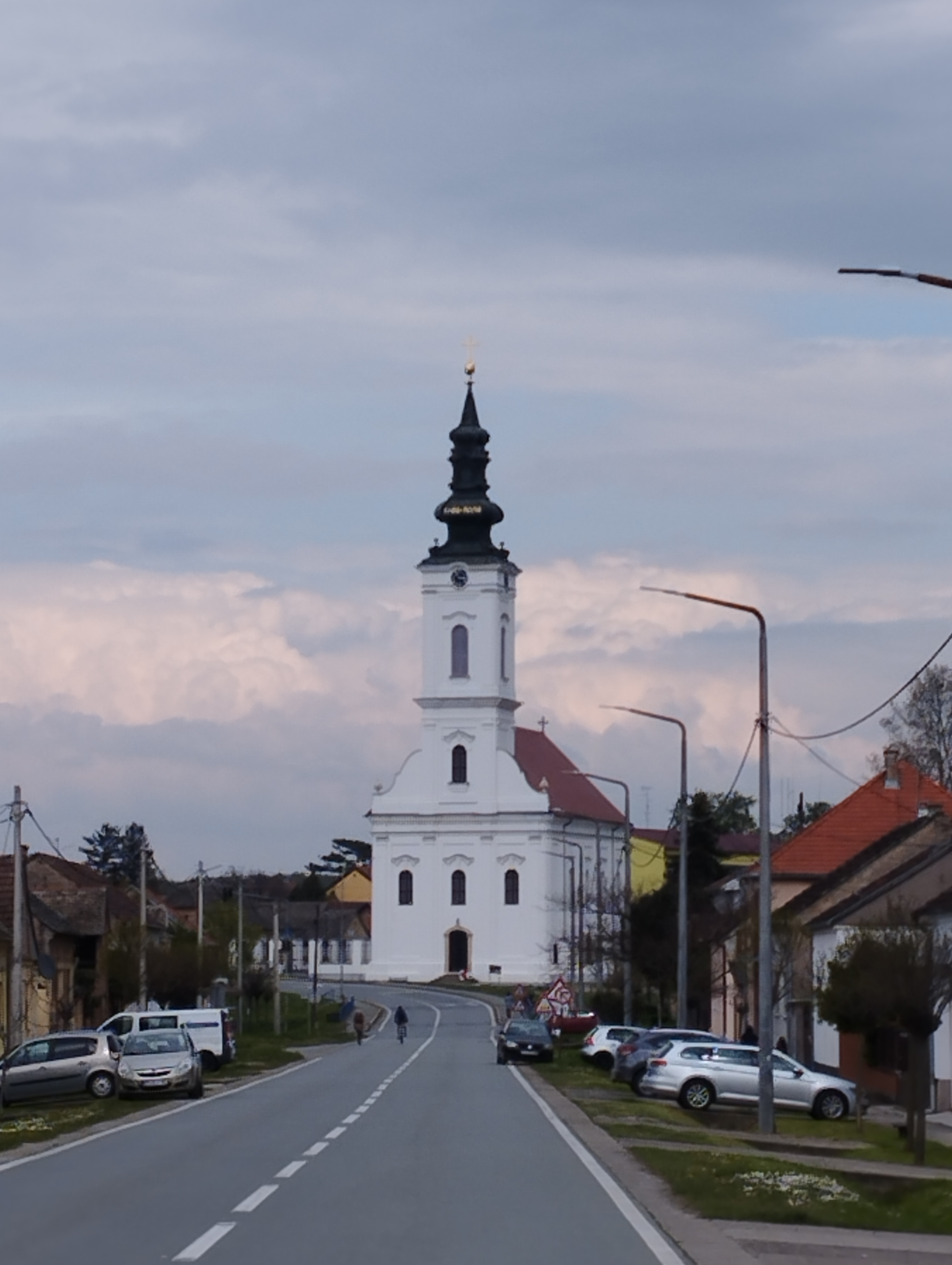
Serbian Orthodox Saint Demetrius Cathedral in Dalj

=== History ===
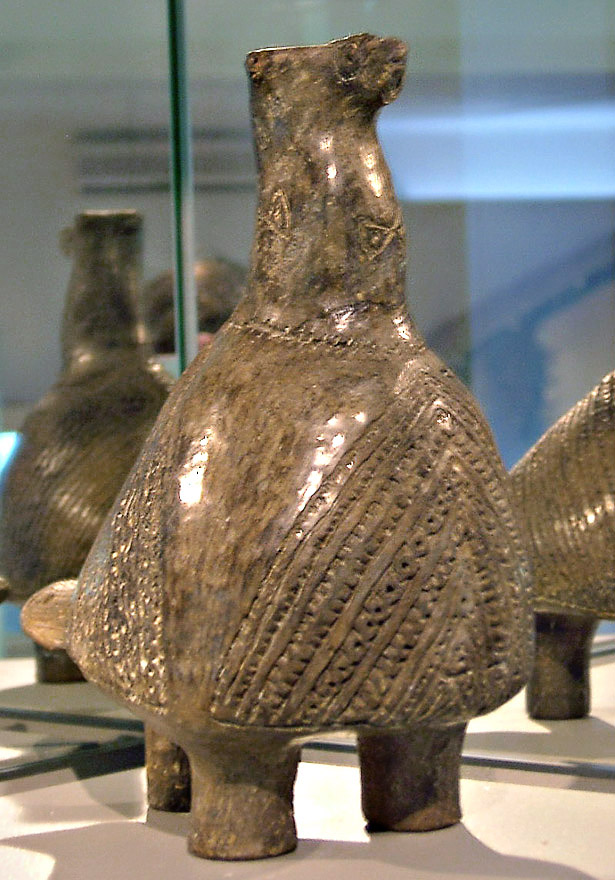
Vučedol dove

Some of the important archaeological cultures that appeared in this area are the Vučedol culture, the Vinča culture and the Starčevo culture. Certainly, the most famous archaeological artifact is the ritual vessel of Vučedol culture, called by the speculative attribution of her founder (in 1938) M. Seper – the Vučedol Dove (vučedolska golubica). Made between 2800 and 2500 B.C. it became the symbol of style, culture and new arising European civilization. The Vučedol dove is a 19,5 cm high ritual vessel made from baked clay. This, as well, proves European pigeon breeding much older than we used to think. Moreover, Vučedol dove is the oldest dove figure found in Europe so far. The ritual vessel is depicted on the reverse of the Croatian 20 kuna banknote, issued in 1993 and 2001.

During the Roman period, Danube was border to barbarian world.

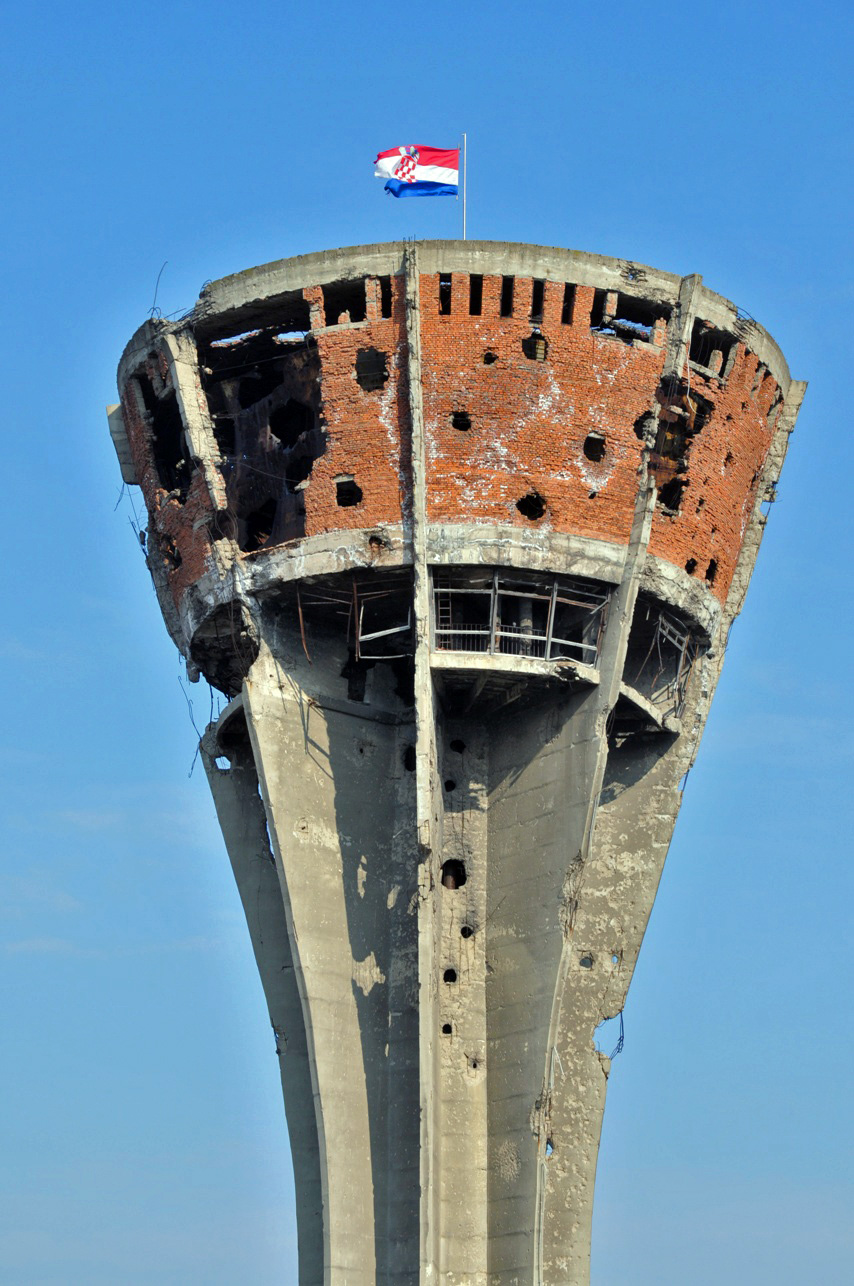
Vukovar water tower

In period from 1991 till 1998 in Podunavlje there was self-proclaimed Eastern Slavonia, Baranya and Western Syrmia that was reintegrated into Croatiaafter signing of Erdut Agreement. Region was declared by local Serbs who promoted survival of Yugoslavia, because of which they had support of Yugoslav People's Army. Local Serb population was further alarmed with comparisons of new Croatian state with World War II Independent State of Croatia and its Jasenovac concentration camp. Croatian War of Independence has left a heavy mark on both the economy and the interpersonal relationships in region. There were especially strained relations between two largest groups, Croats and Serbs.

Some of the most important events of war in eastern Croatia are Battle of Vukovar, Vukovar massacre, and Borovo Selo killings in which in first two cases was killed significant number of civilians. Large part of Croats were forced to leave their homes in Eastern Slavonia, Baranya and Western Syrmia, and their property was looted and destroyed. Some have been captured and imprisoned for some time in Serbia, and some were killed there. Tens of thousands of Croats in this period left Podunavlje. At the same time in Podunavlje came tens of thousands Serbian refugees fleeing from war in the rest of Croatia. After the war ended local population get a difficult task of rebuilding coexistence in which were included a number of organizations such as the Organization for Security and Co-operation in Europe and embassies of foreign countries. However, although progress is slow at times international community has assessed this process as relatively successful. After the war, a number of towns and municipalities in the region were designated Areas of Special State Concern.

=== Nature ===
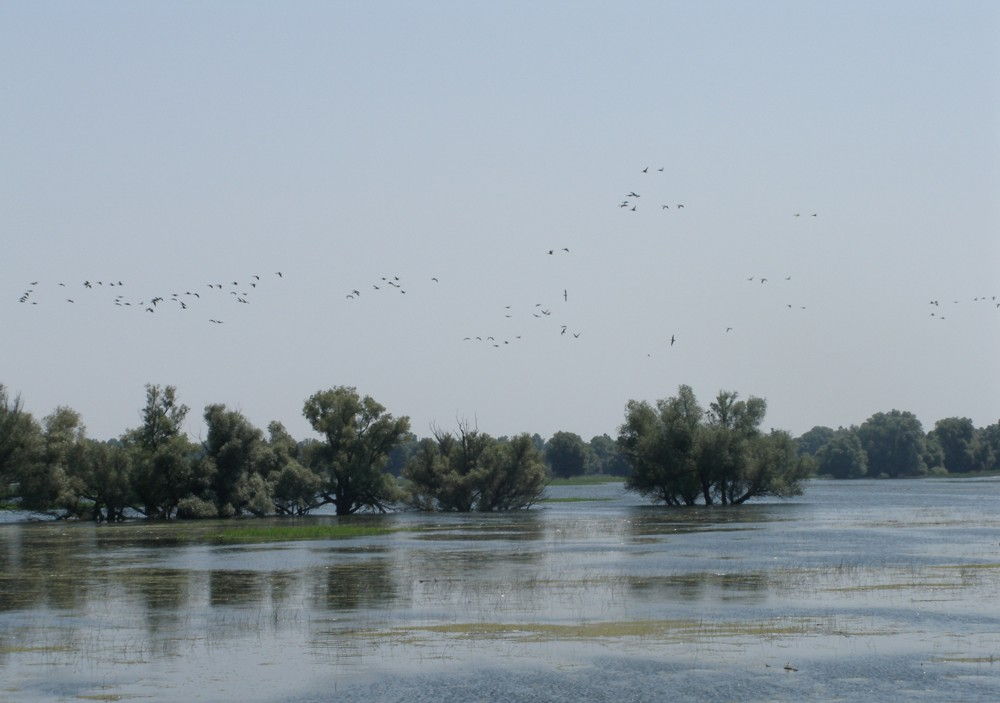
Kopački Rit

Kopački Rit: Nature park Kopački Rit is located northwest of the confluence of the Drava and the Danube, situated at the border with Serbia. It is one of the most important, largest and most attractive preserved intact wetlands in Europe. Around 260 various bird species nest here (wild geese and ducks, great white egret, white stork, black stork, white-tailed eagle, crows, coots, gulls, terns, kingfishers, European green woodpecker, etc.), and there are many other species using this area as a temporary shelter on migration from the northern, cooler regions to the southern, warmer areas and vice versa.

There are 40-odd fish species (pike, ide, tench, bream, carp, catfish, pike-perch, perch, etc.). Several various mammal species inhabit the land (red deer, roe deer, wild boar, wild cat, pine marten, stone marten, weasel, sable, otter, etc.) Rich plant life, typical of wetlands, is found also in Kopački Rit.

== See also ==
- List of regions of Serbia
- Regions of Croatia
