= Bogdanovci =

- Municipality
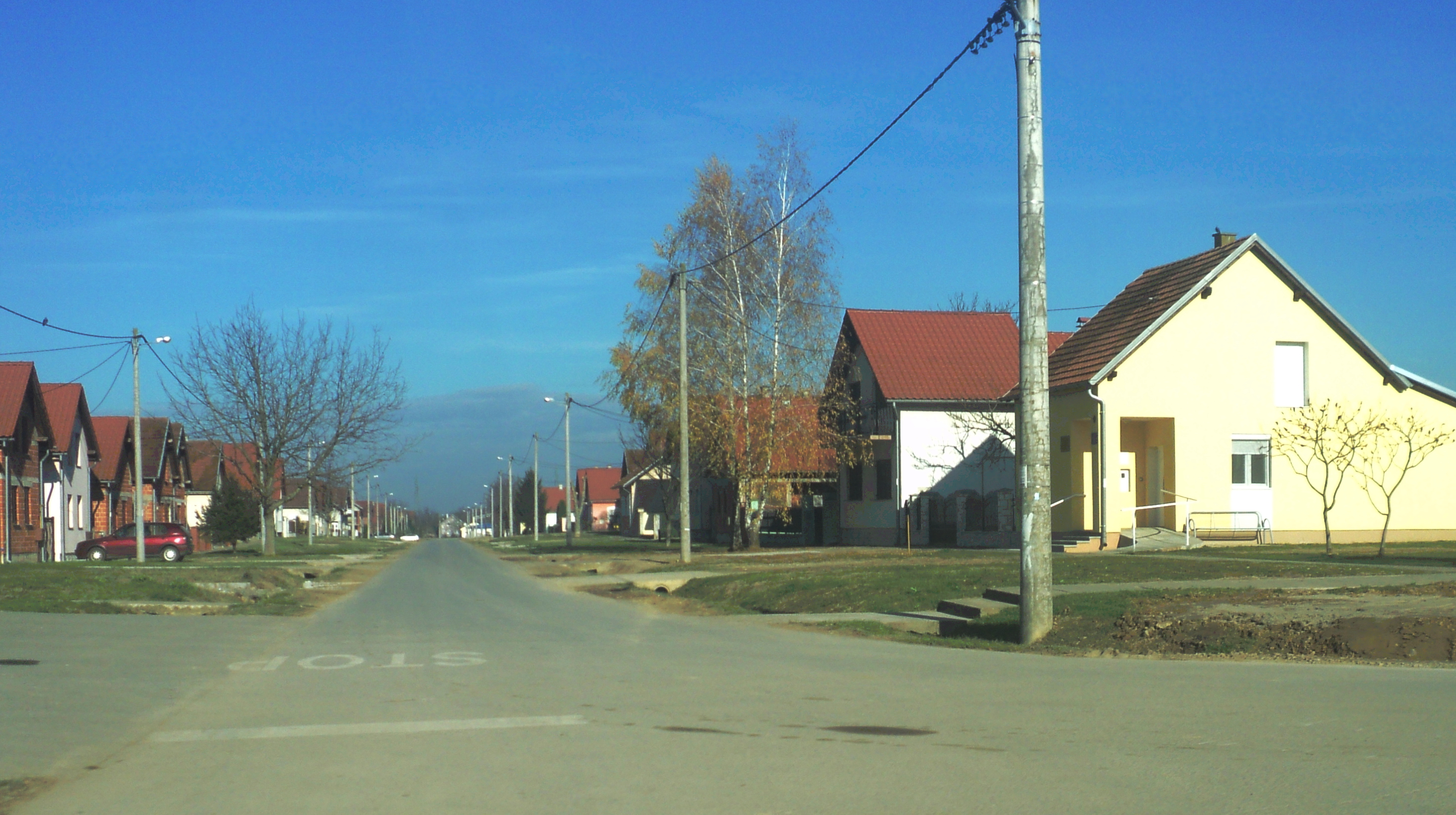
- Interactive map of Bogdanovci
- Location in Croatia
- Coordinates: 45°20′N 18°56′E
- Country: Croatia
- Region: Syrmia (Podunavlje)
- County: Vukovar-Syrmia County
- Municipal seat Largest settlement: Bogdanovci Petrovci

Area
  - Municipality: 51.6 km^{2} (19.9 sq mi)
  - Urban: 16.9 km^{2} (6.5 sq mi)

Population (2021)
  - Municipality: 1,545
  - Density: 29.9/km^{2} (77.5/sq mi)
  - Urban: 614
  - Urban density: 36.3/km^{2} (94.1/sq mi)
- Time zone: UTC+1 (CET)
  - Summer (DST): UTC+2 (CEST)
- Postal code: 32000 Vukovar
- Area code: 32
- Vehicle registration: VK
- Website: opcina-bogdanovci.hr

Bogdanovci (Pannonian Rusyn: Богдановци, Serbian Cyrillic: Богдановци, Hungarian: Bogdánfalva) is a village and a municipality in the Vukovar-Srijem County in eastern Croatia. It is located a few kilometers south of Vukovar in eastern Slavonia. Bogdanovci is underdeveloped municipality which is statistically classified as the First Category Area of Special State Concern by the Government of Croatia.

== History ==
The village was established in the Middle Ages before the Ottoman conquest of the region as a subsidiary settlement of the former village of Mikole. Following the Ottoman conquest Mikole was abandoned with majority of residents moving to Bogdanovci. In the second half of 17th century Calvinists constituted significant part of the local population but they were converted into Catholicism by Franciscan monks who moved to Vukovar from Srijemske Laze. Following Ottoman retreat from the region, the Lordship of Vukovar was established, and the village became part of its domain.

== Population ==
In 2021, the municipality had 1,545 residents in the following settlements:

- Bogdanovci, population 614
- Petrovci, population 643
- Svinjarevci, population 288
Bogdanovci: Population trends 1857–2021
v

population	1769	2102	2270	2489	2588	2574	2694	2832	2913	2965	3304	3218	3133	3167	2366	1960	1545
	1857	1869	1880	1890	1900	1910	1921	1931	1948	1953	1961	1971	1981	1991	2001	2011	2021

Sources: Croatian Bureau of Statistics publications

In the 2011 census there were:

- 56.17% Croats,
- 22.65% Rusyns,
- 9.59% Serbs,
- 7.55% Ukrainians,
- 2.35% Albanians

== Politics ==
=== Minority councils ===
Directly elected minority councils and representatives are tasked with consulting tasks for the local or regional authorities in which they are advocating for minority rights and interests, integration into public life and participation in the management of local affairs. At the 2023 Croatian national minorities councils and representatives elections Albanians, Pannonian Rusyns, Serbs and Ukrainians of Croatia fulfilled legal requirements to elect 10 members minority councils of the Bogdanovci Municipality with some councils electing less than 10 but more than 5 members.
