= Ecologic Association Green Osijek =

The Ecologic Association Green Osijek (Croatian: Ekološko društvo Zeleni Osijek) was founded in 1995 in Osijek, Croatia.

Its main activities are environmental protection, schools in nature, ecotourism and preserving the cultural and natural heritage of Slavonia and Baranja region. The main project of Green Osijek is development of Eco centre Zlatna Greda near the Nature park Kopački rit. In Eco centre Zlatna Greda, the association is organising schools in nature, hiking through wetlands and forests, boat rides on the Danube, birdwatching, making of traditional meals in the open fire under the gazebo.
