= Bikić Do =

Bikić Do Бикић До (Serbian) Бикич Дол (Pannonian Rusyn)
- Village (Selo)
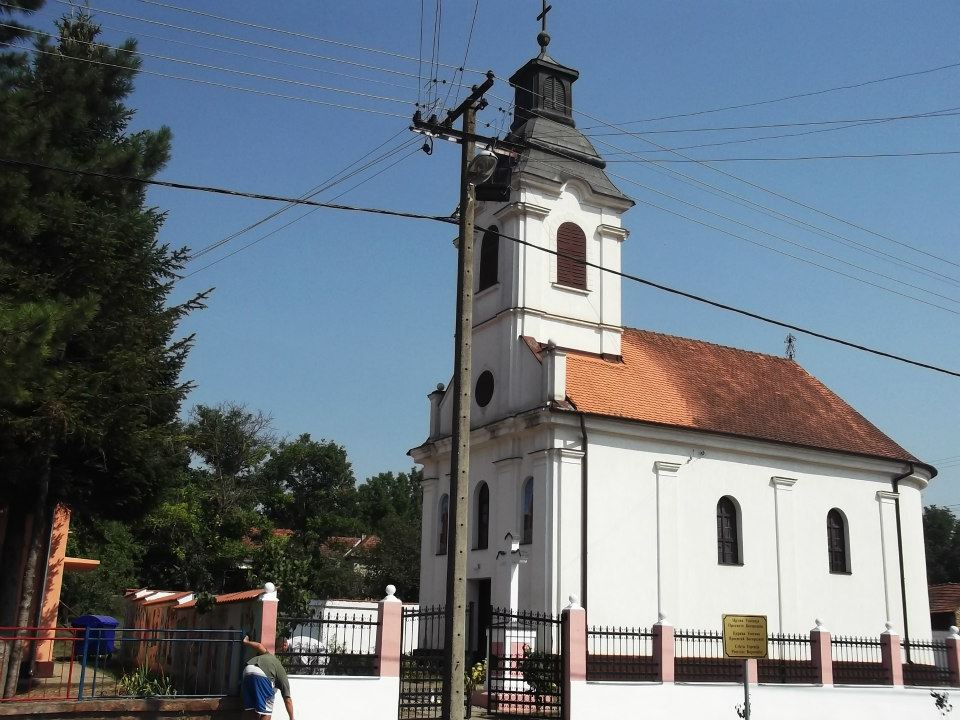
- Interactive map of Bikić Do
- Location within Vojvodina Location within Serbia Location within Europe
- Coordinates: 45°09′15″N 19°17′45″E
- Country: Serbia
- Province: Vojvodina
- Region: Syrmia
- District: Srem
- Municipality: Šid

Population (2022)
  - Total: 199
- Time zone: UTC+1 (CET)
  - Summer (DST): UTC+2 (CEST)

Bikić Do (Serbian Cyrillic: Бикић До, Pannonian Rusyn: Бикич Дол) is a village located in the municipality of Šid, Srem District, Vojvodina, Serbia. The village has a population of 199 people (2022 census).

== Demographics ==
=== Historical population ===
- 1981: 301
- 1991: 299
- 2002: 336
- 2022: 199

=== Ethnic groups ===
According to data from the 2022 census, ethnic groups in the village include:

- 82 (41.2%) Rusyns
- 66 (33.1%) Serbs
- Others/Undeclared/Unknown

== See also ==
- List of places in Serbia
- List of cities, towns and villages in Vojvodina
- Pannonian Rusyns
