= Pannonian Rusyns =

Ethnic group from the Balkans

Pannonian Rusyns Панонски Руснаци Панонски Русини Panonski Rusini
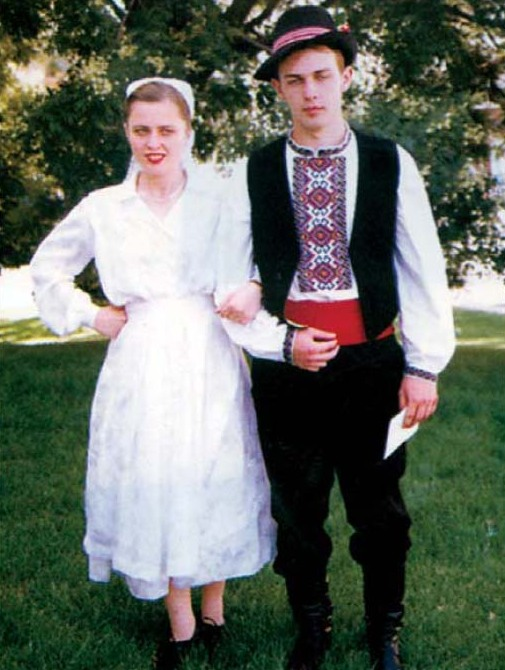

Total population
- c. 12,800

Regions with significant populations
- Serbia: 11,483 (2022)
- Croatia: 1,343 (2021)

Languages
- Pannonian Rusyn

Religion
- Eastern Catholicism, Eastern Orthodoxy

Related ethnic groups
- Slovaks, Ukrainians, other East Slavs

Pannonian Rusyns (Pannonian Rusyn: Русини, romanized: Rusynŷ), also known as Pannonian Rusnaks (Pannonian Rusyn: Руснаци, romanized: Rusnatsŷ), are ethnic Rusyns from the southern regions of the Pannonian Plain (hence, Pannonian Rusyns). Their communities are located mainly in Vojvodina, Serbia, and Slavonia, Croatia. In both of those countries, they are officially recognized as an ethnic minority.

Pannonian Rusyns are descendants of 18th-century migrant communities that came from northeastern (Carpathian) regions, still inhabited today by other groups of (Carpathian) Rusyns, who live in southwestern Ukraine, northeastern Slovakia, southeastern Poland, northern Romania, and northeastern Hungary.

== Name ==
In some non-Slavic languages, Pannonian Rusyns are sometimes also referred to by certain archaic exonyms, such as Pannonian Ruthenes or Pannonian Ruthenians, but those terms are not used in the native Rusyn language. Such terms are also imprecise, since Ruthenian and related exonyms have several broader meanings, both in terms of their historical uses and ethnic scopes, that are encompassing various East Slavic groups.

Geographical Pannonian adjective is used as a neutral term of convenience, since the previous geographical ethnonym (Yugoslav Rusyns) became obsolete after the breakup of Yugoslavia. In order to avoid confusion, the term Pannonian Rusyns is used in modern English terminology as a descriptive regional ethnonym for Rusyn communities in all of those regions, similar to the way the term North American Rusyns is used to refer to the Rusyn diasporas in the United States and Canada.

== History ==
=== Colonization ===
During the 18th century, state authorities of the Habsburg monarchy initiated several programs of re-population and colonization of various regions that were recently liberated from the Ottoman rule. Since 1745, groups of Rusyns from north-eastern Carpathian regions of the Kingdom of Hungary (eastern parts of modern Slovakia and Carpathian regions of modern Ukraine) started to migrate towards southern regions, including Bačka, Srem and Slavonia. The first group settled in the village of Kula in Bačka (modern Serbia), as attested by the 1746 census.

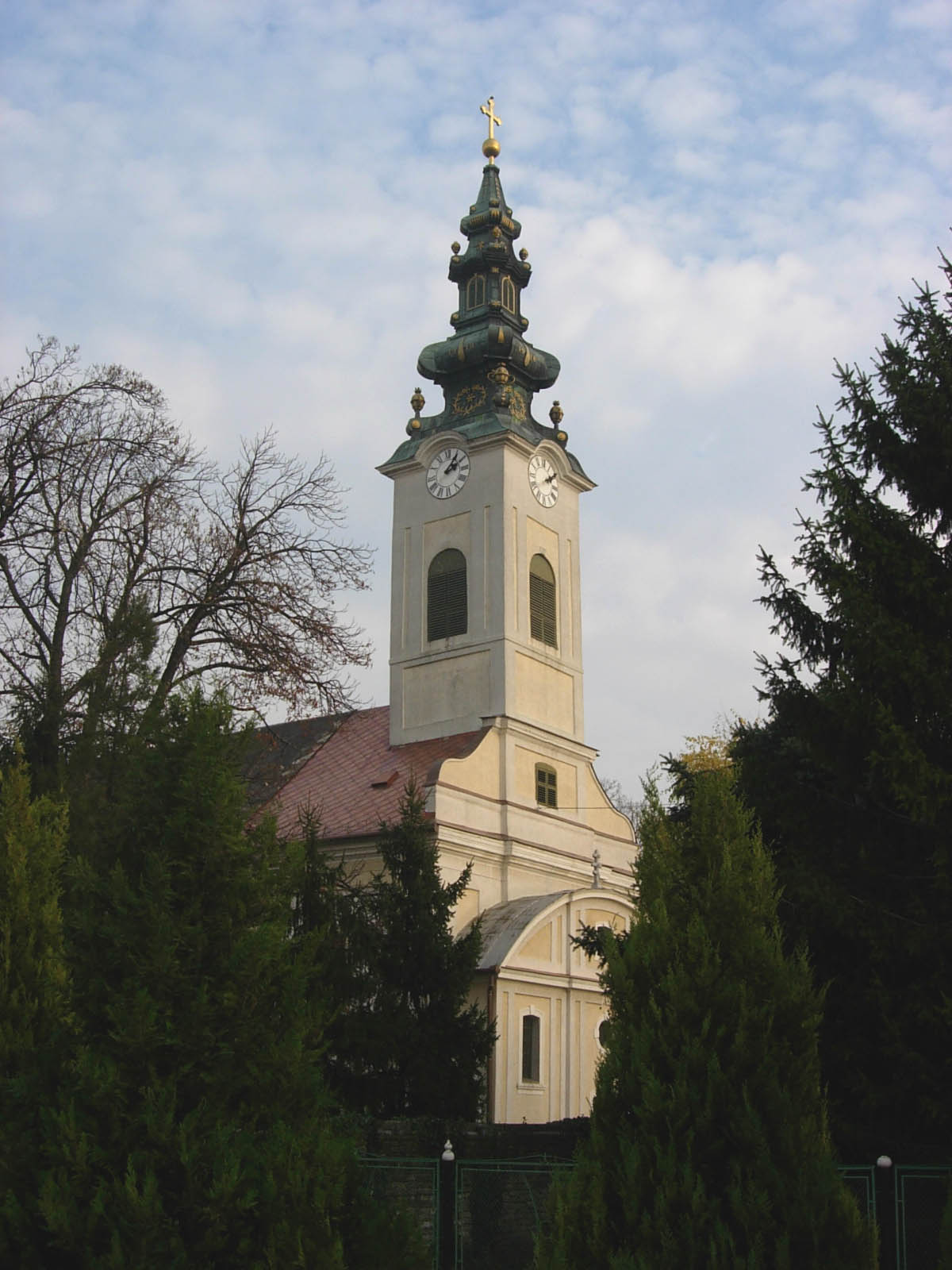
Saint Nicholas Cathedral, seat of the Greek Catholic Eparchy of Ruski Krstur, whose adherents are mainly ethnic Rusyns

During the following years, process of Rusyn colonization was intensified, and on 17 January 1751, regional administrator of Bačka, Franz Joseph von Redl signed an agreement with Mihajlo Munkači from the village of Červenovo, in the county of Bereg, allowing the arrival of 200 Rusyn families from the north-eastern Hungarian region known as the "Upper-Land" (Rusyn: Горнїца) to the village of Krstur (Rusyn: Керестур) in Bačka. In the same year, Munkači managed to settle many Rusyns from the Hungarian counties of Munkačka, Ungvar, Saltmars and Ogačka in Krstur. Ruski Krstur had 2,000 inhabitants by the end of the 18th century. The same administrator signed another agreement on 15 May 1763 with Peter Kiš from Kerestur, allowing the arrival of 150 Rusyn families from the "Upper-Land" to the village of Kucura (Rusyn: Коцур) in Bačka. Kiš, however, failed to bring 150 Ruthenian families to Kucura. In 1763, 41 Rusyn families came to Kucura, and in 1767, another 47 Rusyn families came. Both agreements, from 1751 and 1763, contained special clauses, requiring that Rusyn colonists in terms of their religious affiliation have to be Eastern Catholics. The State Chamber wanted Kucura to be a purely Catholic settlement, and in 1777 they ordered the Serbs, who were almost half of the population of Kucura, to move to Obrovac. In 1792, 258 Rusyn families already lived in Kucura.

As the population grew, many families from Krstur and Kucura migrated to the town of Novi Sad in 1766 and 1767. According to data from the 1767 census there were about 2,000 Rusyns in Bács-Bodrog County (which then was part of Habsburg Monarchy and today comprises Bačka region in Serbia and Hungary). Later, Rusyns settled in Šid and Vajska, and in the early 19th century in Vukovar, Ilok, Jankovci, Grabovo, Miklusevci, Marinci, Rajevo Selo, and Osijek. In Petrovci, Rusyns started to settle in 1833, and later in Bačinci in 1834. In 1836, the first Ruthenian Greek Catholic parish was founded in Petrovci in modern-day Croatia.

=== Yugoslavia ===
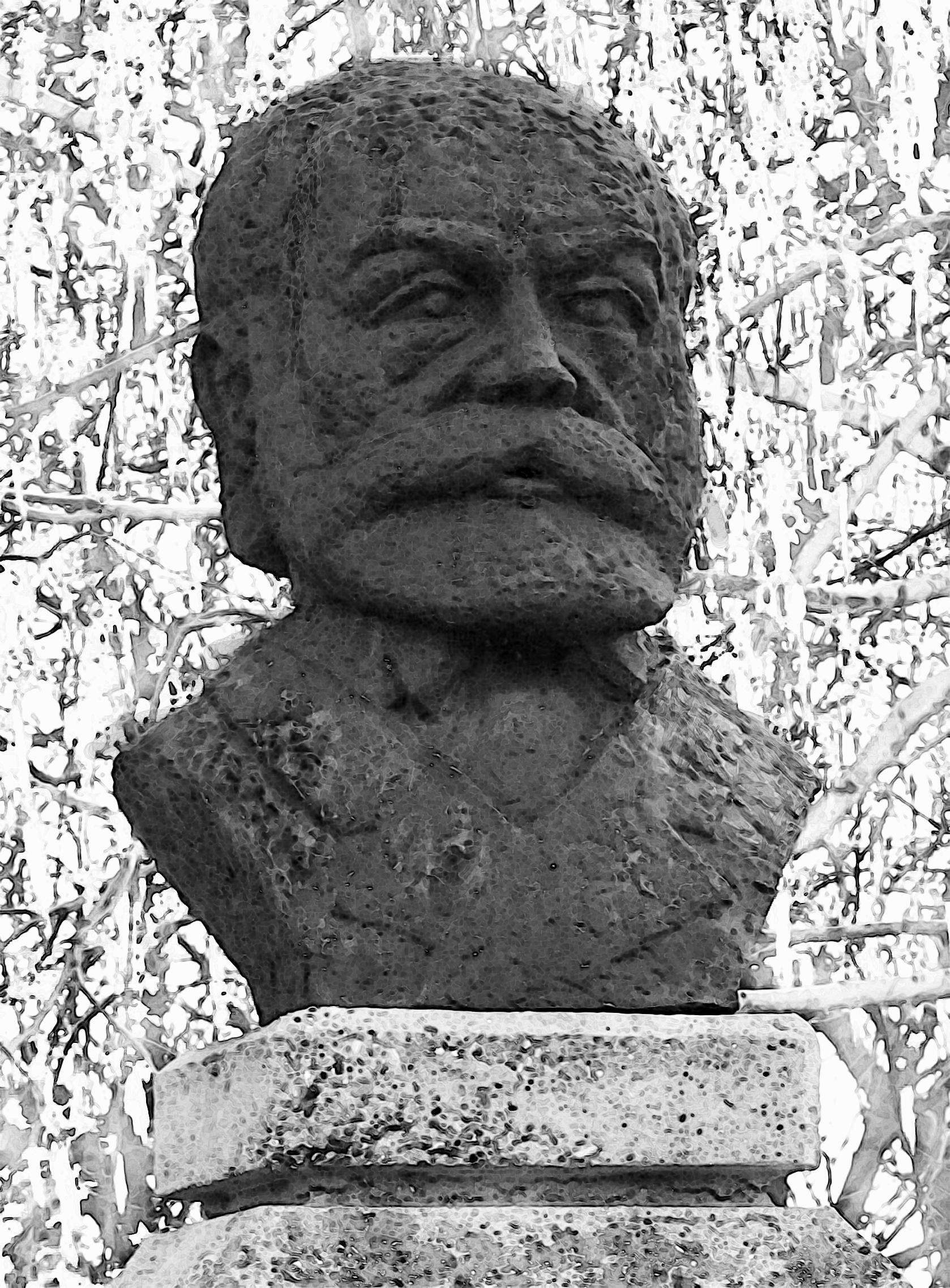
Monument dedicated to Rusyn educator and poet Petro Kuzmyak (1816–1900) in Ruski Krstur, Serbia

After the dissolution of the Austria-Hungary in 1918, southern Pannonian regions became part of the newly formed Kingdom of Serbs, Croats, and Slovenes, known since 1929 as the Kingdom of Yugoslavia. Since it was a South Slavic country, position of various Slavic minorities (including local Rusyns) was improved significantly, particularly in the fields of their cultural development and elementary education. During the interwar period, several Rusyn cultural organizations and periodical publications were established.

After the World War II, in the socialist Yugoslavia, Rusyns were officially recognized as a distinct ethnic minority, and their legal status was regulated in Yugoslav constituent republics of Serbia and Croatia. In the 1963 Constitution of the Socialist Republic of Serbia, Rusyns were designated as one of seven (explicitly named) ethnic minorities, and the same provision was implemented in the Statute of Vojvodina (an autonomous province of Serbia) that was adopted in the same year. Further on, the 1969 Constitutional Law regulated the status of Rusyn language as one of five official languages in Vojvodina.

During the same period, Rusyn ethnic minority was also recognized in the Socialist Republic of Croatia, by the Constitutional Amendment IV, that was adopted in 1972. That provision was confirmed by the new 1974 Constitution of the Socialist Republic of Croatia, that recognized not only local Rusyns but also local Ukrainians, thus designating them as separate and distinct ethnic minorities.

In terms of their cultural development in socialist Yugoslavia, Rusyns had several institutions and organizations. As early as in 1945, а publishing house, called the Rusyn Word (Rusyn: Руске слово) was founded in Novi Sad. It became the main center for publication of Rusyn newspapers, literary works, and school textbooks. In the same year, Rusyn high school was opened in Ruski Krstur. In 1970, the Society for Rusyn Language and Literature (Rusyn: Дружтво за руски язик и литературу) was established in Novi Sad. Since 1972, Rusyn studies were initiated at the Faculty of Philosophy of the University of Novi Sad, and the lectureship for Rusyn Language and Literature (Rusyn: Катедра за руски язик и литературу) was established in 1983.

=== Contemporary period ===
Flag of the National Council of the Rusyn Ethnic Minority in Serbia

Flag of the National Council of Rusyns in Croatia

After the breakup of Yugoslavia (1991–1992), its successor states continued to recognize Rusyns as a distinct ethnic minority. In Croatia, Rusyns are officially recognized as an autochthonous ethnic minority and as such, they elect a special representative to the Croatian Parliament, shared with members of eleven other ethnic minorities.

In Serbia, recognition of Rusyn ethnic minority and its language was confirmed by the provincial statutes of Vojvodina. Since 2002, Rusyns in Serbia have their autonomously elected representative body, the National Council of the Rusyn Ethnic Minority (Rusyn: Национални совит рускей националней меншини), headquartered in Ruski Krstur. The Department of Rusynistics (Rusyn: Одсек за русинистику) was established at the Faculty of Philosophy University of Novi Sad in 2002. In 2008, the Institute for Culture of Rusyns in Vojvodina (Rusyn: Завод за културу войводянских Руснацох) was founded in Novi Sad.

== Demographics ==
Pannonian Rusyns mostly live in the province of Vojvodina (Serbia) and in the region of Slavonia (Croatia). Currently, the number of Pannonian Rusyns declines and total population in both countries is estimated to be less than 13,000. The main reason for this is the economic migration, since the increasing number of Rusyns move to western countries, particularly Canada.

According to data from the 2022 census, there are 11,483 ethnic Rusyns in Serbia. In terms of religious affiliation, 94.9% declared as Christians (75.4% Catholics, 18.5% Eastern Orthodox, and 0.7% Protestansts). The village of Ruski Krstur in the Kula municipality is the only settlement with Rusyn ethnic majority and is a cultural centre of Rusyns in Serbia. Villages with a Rusyn ethnic plurality include Kucura in the Vrbas municipality, and Bikić Do in the Šid municipality. There is a considerable concentration of Rusyns in Novi Sad, where there is Greek Catholic parish church of St. Peter and Paul.

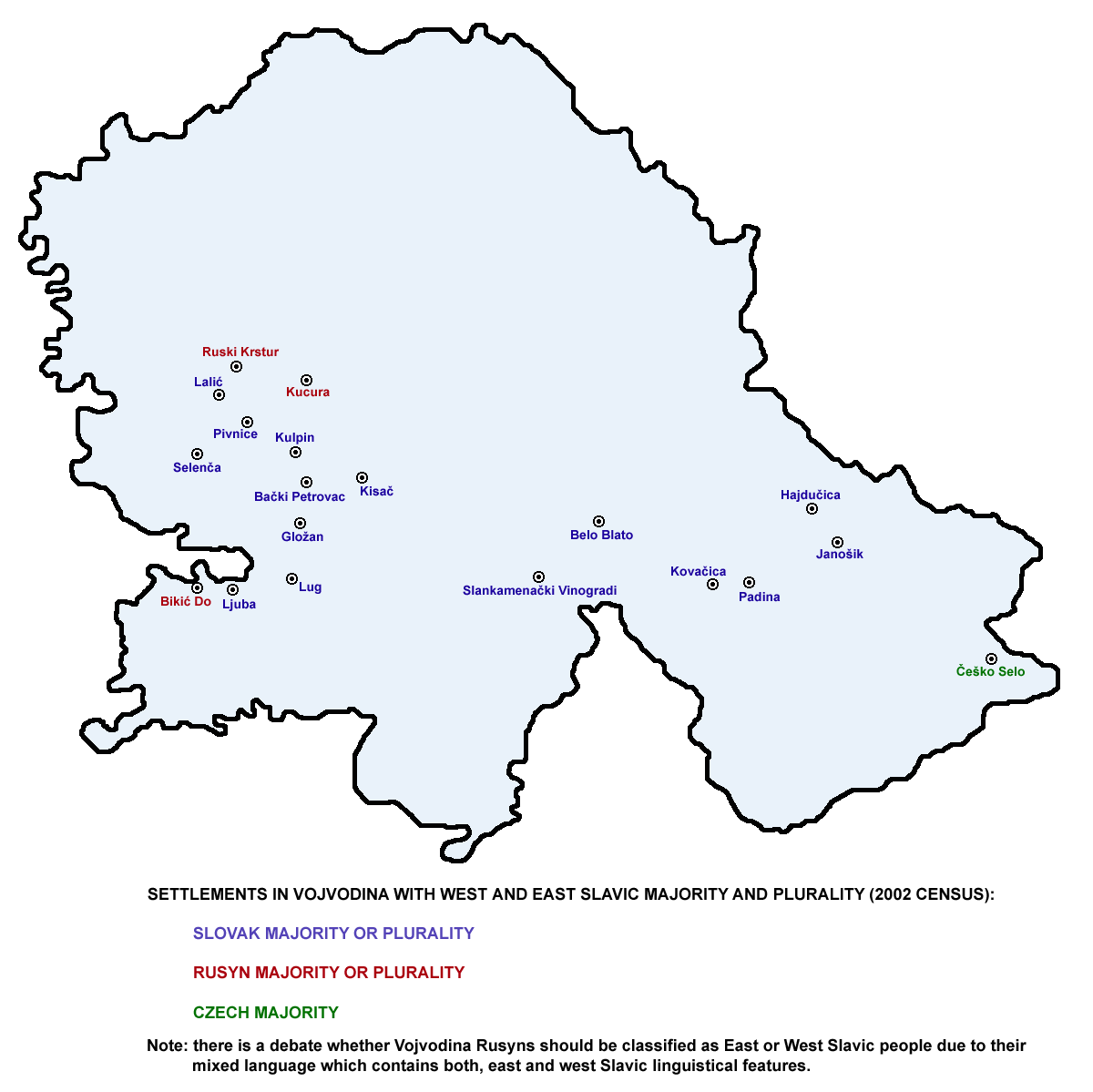
Villages with Rusyn ethnic majority or plurality in Serbian province of Vojvodina

There are also Rusyn communities in Slavonia (Croatia), forming a majority in the village of Petrovci, Bogdanovci municipality, in Vukovar-Srijem county.

Serbia (2022 census)

- Ruski Krstur: 2,963 or 77% of population
- Kucura: 1,671 or 42.3%
- Đurđevo: 837 or 18.1%
- Bikić Do: 82 or 41.2%

Croatia (1991 census)

- Petrovci, Croatia: 737 or 57.1% of population

== Language ==
Rusyns in Serbia and Croatia consider their linguistic variety, known as Pannonian Rusyn, to be one of four standardized versions of the Rusyn language, while some linguists also classify it as a microlanguage. They are using a standardized version of Rusyn Cyrillic alphabet.

Rusyn is one of the six official languages of provincial administration in Vojvodina, while in Croatia it is officially used in two settlements.

== Notable people ==
- Jaša Bakov – athlete and activist
- Mihail Dudaš – athlete
- Đura Džudžar – bishop
- Ljubomir Fejsa – football player
- Joakim Herbut – bishop
- Ivan Lenđer – swimmer
- Slavomir Miklovš – bishop
- Olena Papuga – politician
- Silvester Takač – football player
- Danijela Štajnfeld – actress

== Other sources ==
- Barić, Eugenija (2007). Rusinski jezik u procjepu prošlosti i sadašnjosti. Zagreb: Institut za hrvatski jezik i jezikoslovlje. ISBN 9789536637348.
- Biljnja, Vladimir (1987). Rusini u Vojvodini: Prilog izučavanju istorije Rusina Vojvodine (1918-1945). Novi Sad: Dnevnik.
- Fejsa, Mihajlo P. (1998). "Yugoslav Rusyns: Identity, Culture, Education, Religion". National Minorities in Vojvodina: Proceedings. Novi Sad: Association des etats généraux etudiants de l'Europe. pp. 56–67.
- Fejsa, Mihajlo P. (2014). "The Ruthenian journey from the Carpathian mountains to the Panonian Plain". Русин: Международный исторический журнал. 36 (2): 182–191.
- Fejsa, Mihajlo P. (2015). "The Preservаtion of the Rusyn Language and Culture in Serbia/Vojvodina". A Jubilee Collection: Essays in Honor of Professor Paul Robert Magocsi on his 70th Birthday. Uzhhorod: Valerii Padiak Publishers. pp. 193–202.
- Fejsa, Mihajlo P. (2017a). "The improvement of the orthographic rules in the Bachka-Srem Rusin Language". Русин: Международный исторический журнал. 50 (4): 165–178.
- Fejsa, Mihajlo P. (2017b). "Ruthenian Minority in Vojvodina and its Language". Balkanistic Forum. 26 (3): 66–77.
- Fejsa, Mihajlo P. (2018). "Verb forms/constructions in the Prešov variant and the Bačka-Srem variant of the Rusyn language". Studia Slavica. 63 (2): 367–378. doi:10.1556/060.2018.63.2.16. S2CID 145920941. Archived from the original on 2022-02-18.
- Harasowska, Marta (1999). Morphophonemic Variability, Productivity, and Change: The Case of Rusyn. Berlin-New York: Mouton de Gruyter. ISBN 9783110157611.
- Катунин, Дмитрий А. (2015a). "Языковые права русинов, украинцев и других национальных меньшинств в законодательстве Республики Сербия". Русин: Международный исторический журнал. 39 (1): 229–238. Archived from the original on 2024-12-02.
- Катунин, Дмитрий А. (2015b). "Русинский язык и языки других национальных меньшинств в законодательстве Воеводины: Статья 1". Русин: Международный исторический журнал. 42 (4): 235–250.
- Катунин, Дмитрий А. (2016). "Русинский язык и языки других национальных меньшинств в законодательстве Воеводины: Статья 2". Русин: Международный исторический журнал. 43 (1): 271–284.
- Jankulov, Borislav (1961). Pregled kolonizacije Vojvodine u XVIII i XIX veku (1. ed.). Novi Sad: Matica srpska.
- Лађевић, Петар, ed. (2014). Етноконфесионални и језички мозаик Србије (PDF). Београд: Републички завод за статистику. Archived (PDF) from the original on 2019-04-06.
- Лабош, Федор (1979). История Русинох Бачкей, Сриму и Славониї 1745-1918. Вуковар: Союз Русинох и Українцох Горватской.
- Magocsi, Paul R. (1992). "The Birth of a New Nation, or the Return of an Old Problem? The Rusyns of East Central Europe". Canadian Slavonic Papers. 34 (3): 199–223. doi:10.1080/00085006.1992.11091987. JSTOR 40870573.
- Magocsi, Paul R. (1996). "The Rusyn language question revisited" (PDF). International Journal of the Sociology of Language. 120: 63–84. doi:10.1515/ijsl.1996.120.63. S2CID 56325995. Archived (PDF) from the original on 2021-06-24.
- Magocsi, Paul R. (1999a). Of the Making of Nationalities There is No End. Vol. 1. Boulder: East European Monographs. ISBN 9780880334389.
- Magocsi, Paul R. (1999b). Of the Making of Nationalities There is No End. Vol. 2. Boulder: East European Monographs. ISBN 9780880334389.
- Magocsi, Paul R.; Pop, Ivan I., eds. (2005) [2002]. Encyclopedia of Rusyn History and Culture (2. rev. ed.). Toronto: University of Toronto Press.
- Magocsi, Paul R. (2011). "The Fourth Rus': A New Reality in a New Europe" (PDF). Journal of Ukrainian Studies. 35-36 (2010-2011): 167–177. Archived (PDF) from the original on 2021-07-17.
- Magocsi, Paul R. (2015). With Their Backs to the Mountains: A History of Carpathian Rus' and Carpatho-Rusyns. Budapest-New York: Central European University Press. ISBN 9786155053467.
- Medješi, Ljubomir (1993). "The Problem of Cultural Borders in the History of Ethnic Groups: The Yugoslav Rusyns". The Persistence of Regional Cultures: Rusyns and Ukrainians in Their Carpathian Homeland and Abroad. Boulder: East European Monographs. pp. 139–162. ISBN 9780880332620.
- Рамач, Янко (1993). Кратка история Руснацох (1745-1918). Нови Сад: Грекокатолїцка парохия св. Петра и Павла. Archived from the original on 2025-04-29.
- Ramač, Janko (2018). "Osnovni pravci, težnje i dileme u kulturno-prosvetnom i nacionalnom životu Rusina u Jugoslaviji (1945-1970)" (PDF). Київські історичні студії. 6 (1): 63–73.
- Рамач, Јулијан; Фејса, Михајло; Међеши, Хелена, eds. (1995). Српско-русински речник (PDF). Vol. 1. Нови Сад: Филозофски факултет - Катедра за русински језик и књижевност, Друштво за русински језик и књижевност.
- Рамач, Јулијан; Фејса, Михајло; Међеши, Хелена, eds. (1997). Српско-русински речник (PDF). Vol. 2. Београд-Нови Сад: Завод за уџбенике и наставна средства, Филозофски факултет - Катедра за русински језик и књижевност, Друштво за русински језик и књижевност.
- Sakač, Marija (2019). "Narratives of ethnic identity and language among young Pannonian Ruthenians in Serbia". Adeptus. 14: 1–18.
- Slivka, John (1973). Correct nomenclature: Greek rite or Byzantine rite: Rusin or Ruthenian: Rusin or Slovak?. Brooklyn, N.Y.
- Slivka, John (1989) [1977]. Who are we? Nationality: Rusin, Russian, Ruthenian, Slovak? Ecclesiastical name: Greek Rite Catholic, Byzantine Rite Catholic? (2. ed.). Brooklyn, N.Y.
- Trier, Tom, ed. (1999). Focus on the Rusyns: International Colloquium on the Rusyns of East Central Europe. Copenhagen: Danish Cultural Institute. ISBN 9788774290940.
