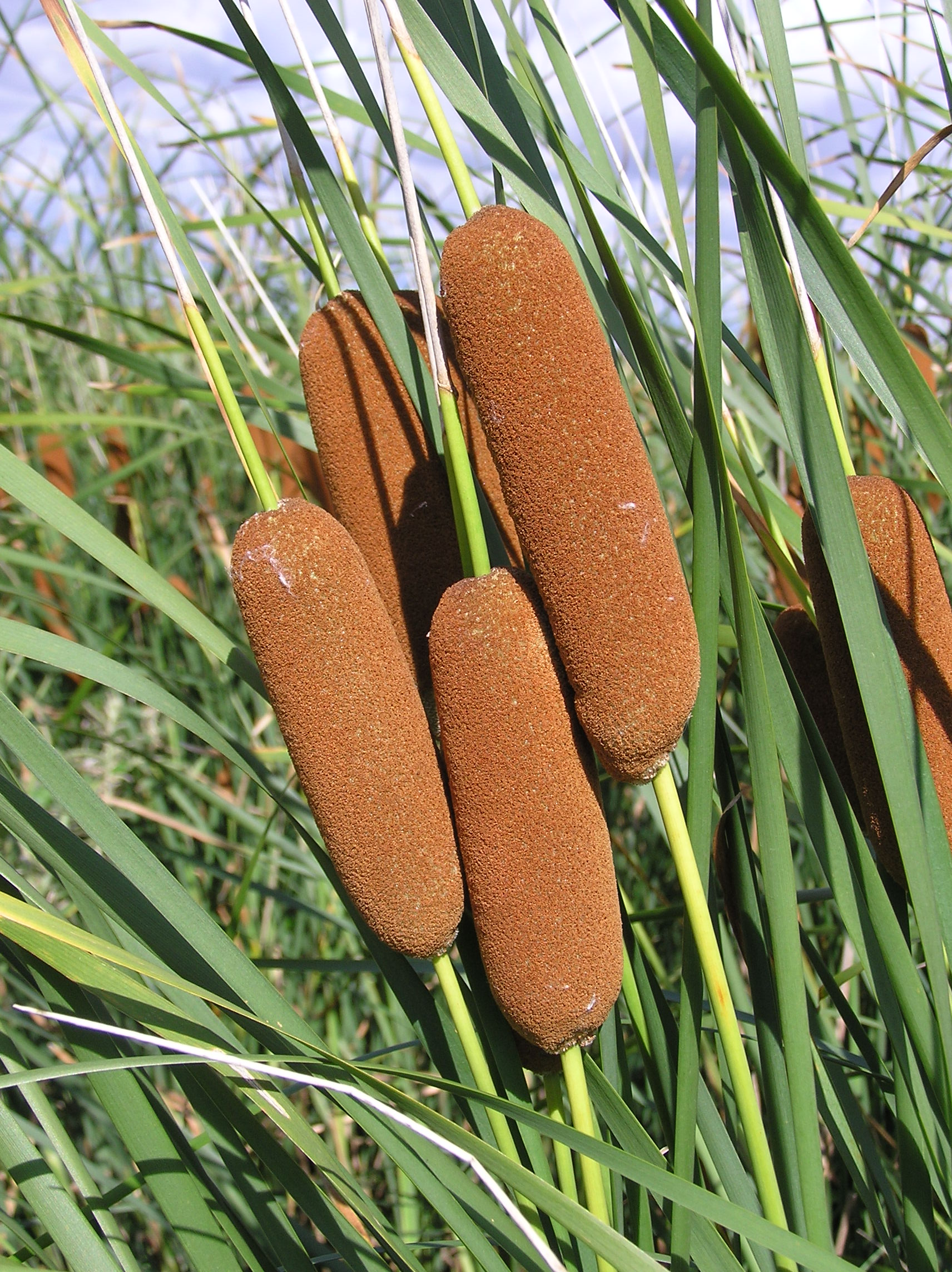

Conservation status
- Least Concern (IUCN 3.1)

Scientific classification
- Kingdom: Plantae
- Clade: Tracheophytes
- Clade: Angiosperms
- Clade: Monocots
- Clade: Commelinids
- Order: Poales
- Family: Typhaceae
- Genus: Typha
- Species: T. laxmannii

Binomial name
- Typha laxmannii Lepech.

Synonyms
- Typha angustissima Griff. ex Rohrb.; Typha balansae Reut. ex Rohrb.; Typha bungeana C.Presl; Typha caucasica Lehm. ex Rohrb.; Typha elliptica C.C.Gmel.; Typha juncea Steven ex Rohrb.; Typha juncifolia Celak.; Typha juncifolia Montandon; Typha minuta Schrenk ex Rohrb.; Typha nana Avé-Lall.; Typha poitiaei Poit. ex Rohrb.; Typha stenophylla Hausskn. ex Rohrb.; Typha veresczaginii Krylov & Schischk.; Typha zerovii Klok. fil & A. Krasnova

= Typha laxmannii =

Graceful cattail

Species of aquatic plant

Typha laxmannii, the graceful cattail, is a wetland plant species, widespread across Europe and Asia. Typha laxmannii is not as tall as many of the other species in the genus, rarely more than 130 cm high. A noticeable space separates the staminate (male) flowers from the pistillate (female) ones.
