= Eastern Slavonia, Baranja and Western Syrmia =

Eastern Slavonia, Baranja and Western Syrmia may refer to:

- SAO Eastern Slavonia, Baranja and Western Syrmia (1991–1992)
- Eastern Slavonia, Baranja and Western Syrmia (1995–98)

== See also ==
- United Nations Transitional Administration for Eastern Slavonia, Baranja and Western Sirmium, 1996-1998
