= Eltz (disambiguation) =

Eltz is a German noble family.

Eltz may also refer to:

== People ==
- Jakob Graf zu Eltz (1921–2006), Croatian politician
- Theodore von Eltz (1893–1964), American film actor

== Places ==
- Eltz Castle, a medieval castle on the Moselle River, Germany
- Eltz Manor, a Baroque palace in Vukovar, Croatia

== Other uses ==
- Eltz Feud, a 14th-century feud between rulers of Trier and members of the knightly class

== See also ==
- Elz (disambiguation)
- Jakob von Eltz-Rübenach (1510–1581), Archbishop-Elector of Trier
- Kuno von Eltz-Rübenach (1904–1945), German politician
- Philipp Karl von Eltz-Kempenich (1665–1743), Archbishop-Elector of Mainz
