= Ceric =

Ceric may refer to:

- Cerium, a chemical element
- Cerić, Croatia, a village near Vinkovci
- Cerić (surname), a Bosnian surname
