= Cerić =

Cerić may refer to:

- Cerić, Croatia, a village near Vinkovci
- Cerić (surname), a Bosnian surname
