= Lordship of Vukovar =

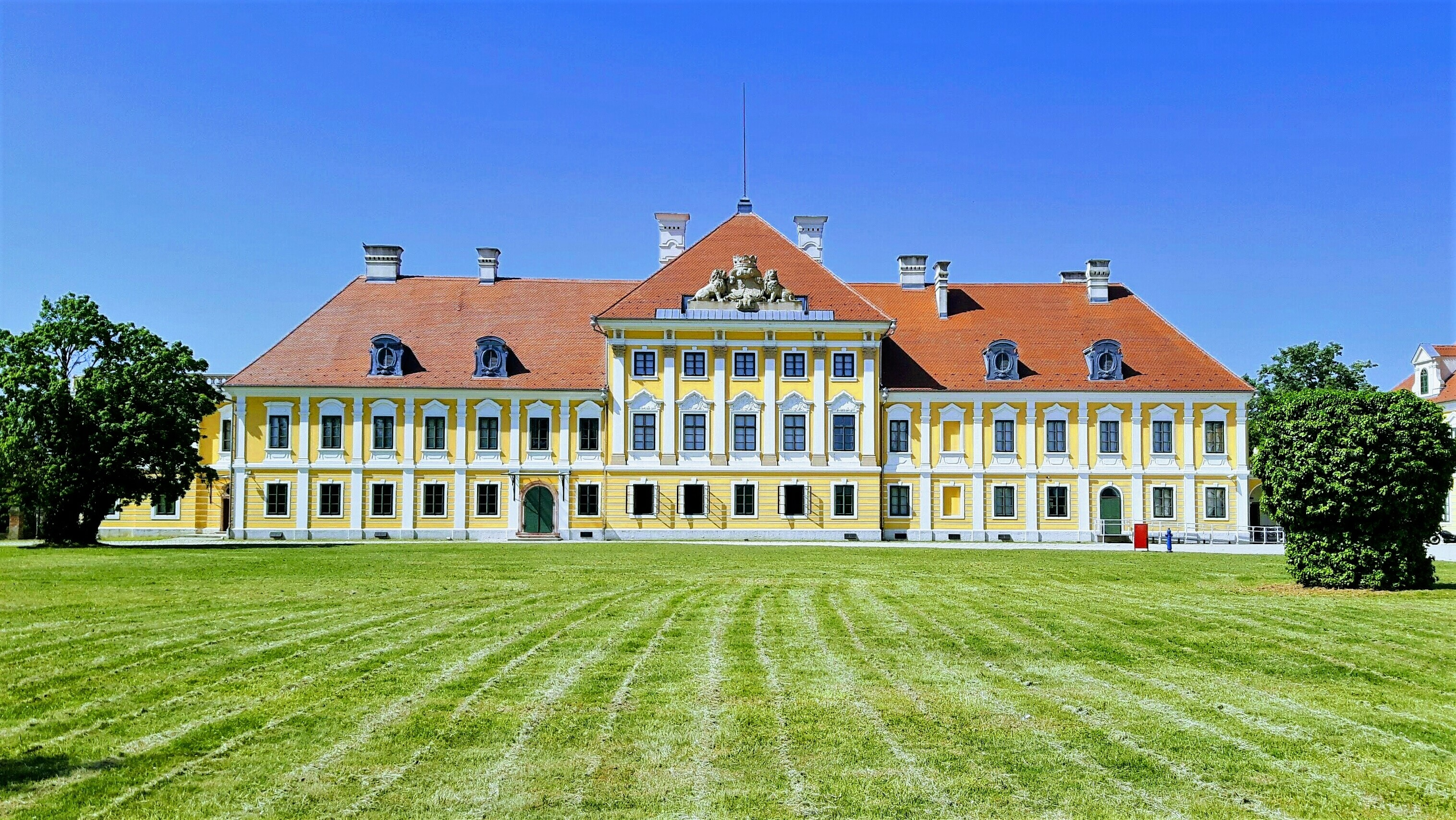
Eltz Manor in Vukovar

The Lordship of Vukovar (German: Herrschaft Vukovar, Serbo-Croatian: Vukovarsko vlastelinstvo, Вуковарско властелинство) was a large land estate, lordship, established in the Kingdom of Slavonia in 1731, after the liberation of the region from the Ottoman rule following the 1699 Treaty of Karlowitz. The seat of the lordship was in the town of Vukovar, on the banks of the Danube river where between 1749 and 1751 representative Eltz Manor was constructed. The lordship existed until the end of the World War II in Yugoslavia and the establishment of the Federal People's Republic of Yugoslavia in 1945. Significant part of its agricultural estates was subsequently run by the agricultural production company—Vupik.

== History ==
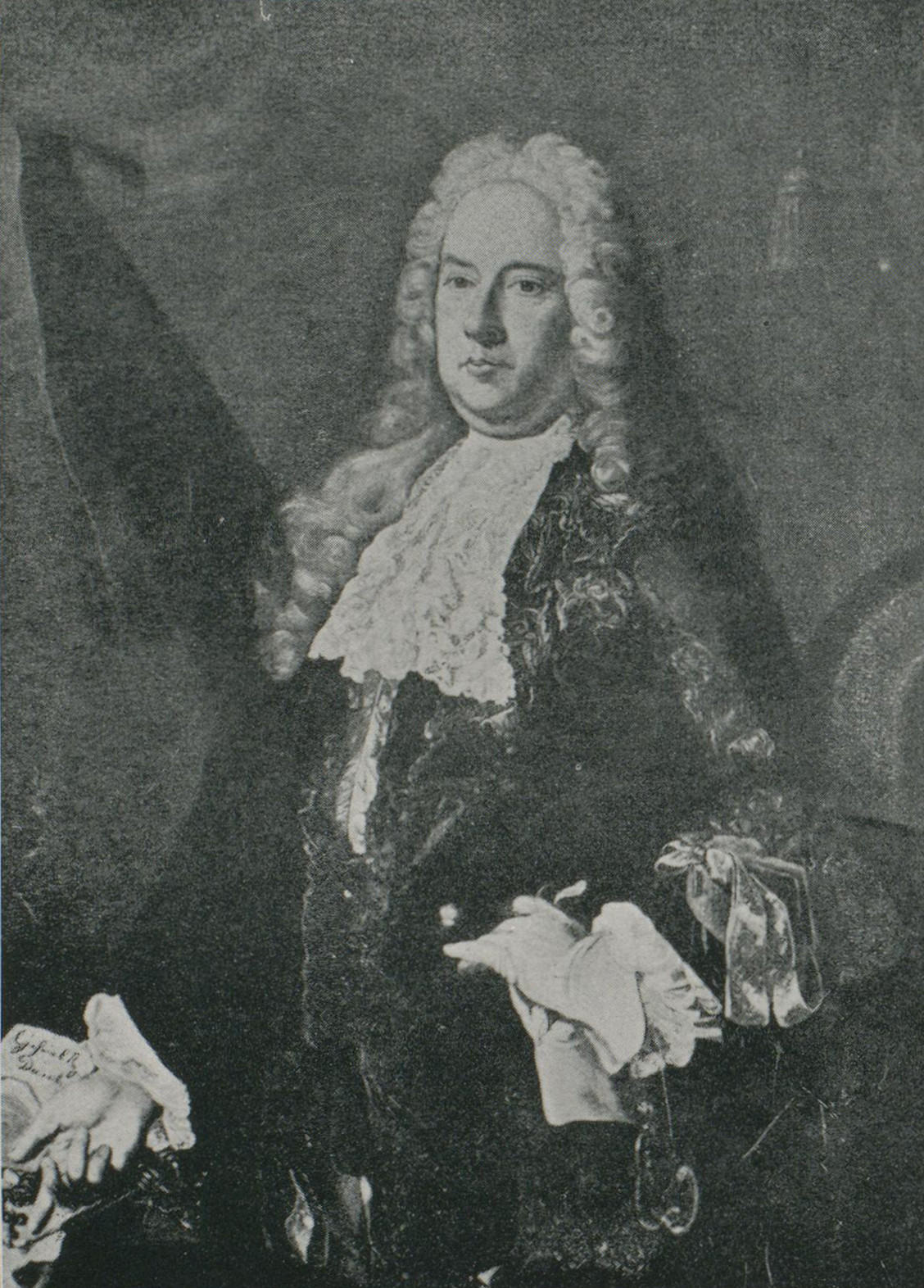
Count Johann Ferdinand I von Kuefstein, the first lord of Vukovar (1688-1755)

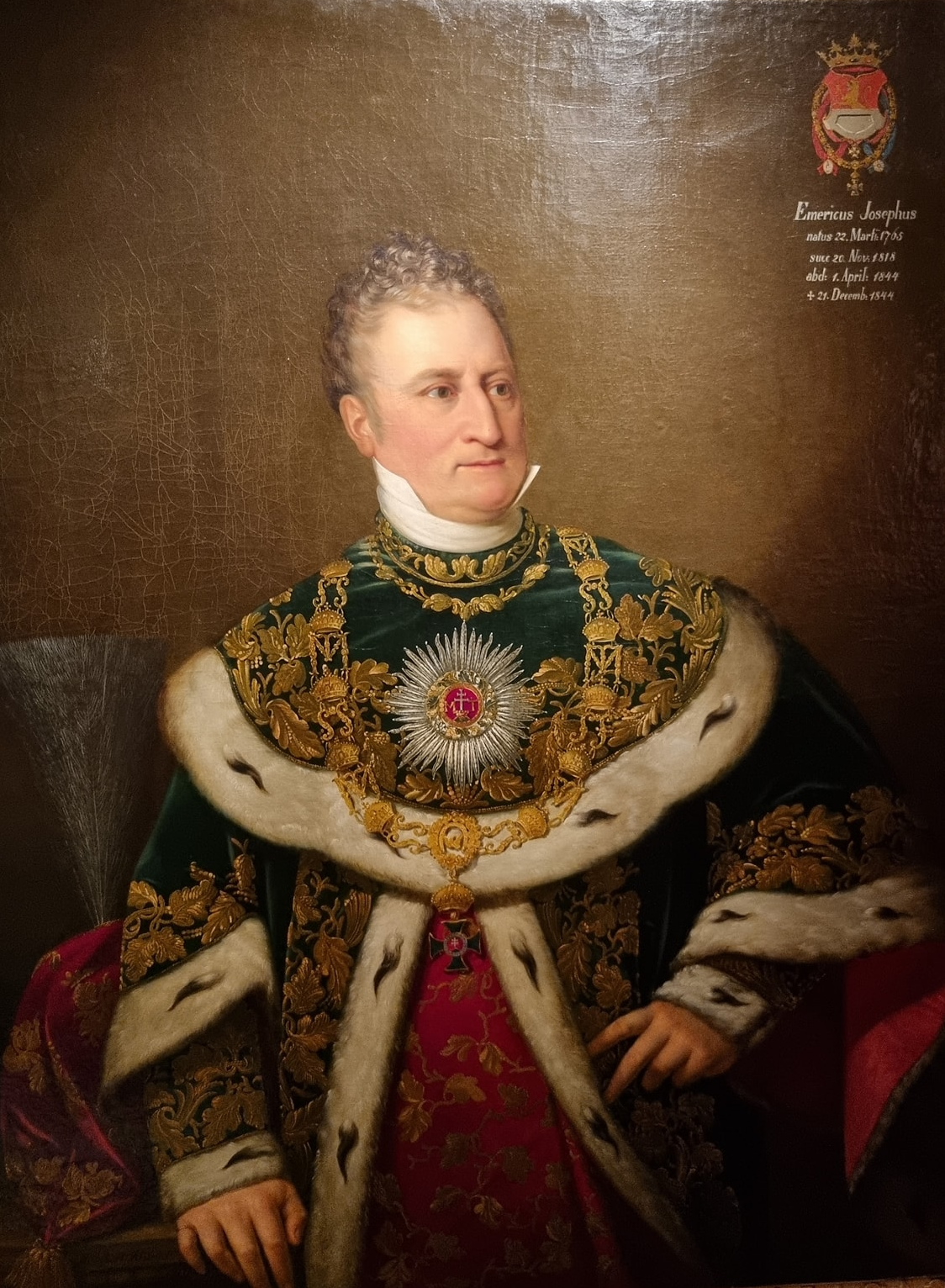
Count Emmerich von und zu Eltz gennant Faust von Stromberg, Lord of Vukovar (1765-1844)

The 1687 Battle of Mohács opened the space to the Habsburg Empire forces to reconquest areas in Slavonia and Syrmia from the Ottoman Empire with 10 years of fighting in the areas between Vukovar and Ilok which led to almost complete depopulation of the region until 1699.

The first 1702 inventory of the area governed by the Habsburg crown included the town of Vukovar as well as the villages of Komletinci, Otok, Nijemci, Đeletovci, Ilača, Tovarnik, Lovas, Tompojevci, Čakovci, Berak, Svinjarevci, Negoslavci and Bogdanovci.

1716 list expanded the area to Sotin, Opatovac, Šarengrad, Novak, Vašica, Ilinci, Banovci, Orolik, Slakovci, Laze, Jankovci and Petrovci while Komletinci and Otok were now part of the Slavonian Military Frontier. While the area was originally directly governed by the Habsburg crown, the land in Slavonia was exponentially granted to prominent noble families after the signing of the Treaty of Passarowitz 1718.

In exchange for Diószeg, in 1725 Charles VI, Holy Roman Emperor gave the area to Johann Ferdinand I. von Kuefstein adding to it the villages of Trpinja, Bršadin, Antin, Pačetin, Korođ, Tordinci, Vera and Bobota. Johann Ferdinand I. von Kuefstein was introduced to the Lordship in a ceremony in Vukovar on 3 October 1728 and he received the title of Primus acquirens dominii Vuckovar as well as the formal royal grant in 1731. In 1736 he nevertheless sold the property to Philipp Karl von Eltz-Kempenich, the Archchancellor of the Holy Roman Empire and Prince-Archbishop of Mainz. In 1737 villages of Banovci, Đeletovci, Ilinci, Laze, Nijemci Orolik and Slakovci were transferred to Military Frontier. The House of Eltz will continue to rule over the Lordship of Vukovar from 1736 until its abolition in 1945.

In 1784 Eltz family coat of arms was introduced to the Lordship of Vukovar while comprehensive land measurement of the region was completed in 1788. During the Revolutions of 1848 uprising spread over the lordship and Hugo Filip Karlo was murdered by rebellious soldiers in front of Vukovar accusing him of being Hungarian spy. The order in the lordship was re-established by the Ban of Croatia Josip Jelačić who himself stayed at the Eltz Manor in May 1849.

During the 1919–1931 land reform in interwar Yugoslavia, 10,764 hectares (26,600 acres) of the lordship was expropriated and distributed.

== Counts of Vukovar ==
- Philipp Karl von Eltz-Kempenich
- Anselm Casimir (1709–78)
- Hugo Filip (1742–1818)
- Emerik Josip Nepomuk (1765–1844)
- Johan Filip Jakob (1779–1844)
- Hugo Filip Karlo (1817–48)
- Karlo Emerik Ivan Nepomuk
- Jakob Petar (1860–1906)
- Karlo (1896–1922)
- Jakob Graf zu Eltz (1921–2006)

== See also ==
- Syrmia County
- Vukovar Plateau
- Újlaki family
- Lordship of Ilok and Upper Syrmia
- Lordship of Nuštar
