= Elze (disambiguation) =

Elze may refer to:

== Places ==
- Elze, Lower Saxony, Germany
- Elze, district of Wedemark, Hanover, Germany
- Elze, name for that portion of the Alzette river through Goethe, Germany
- A district of Malons-et-Elze, France

== People ==
Elze or Eltze is a German surname:

- Karl Elze (1821-1889), German scholar and Shakespearean critic

== Transportation ==
- Elze–Bodenburg railway
- Elze–Löhne railway

== See also ==
- Elz (disambiguation)
- Eltz (disambiguation)
