= Kuno von Eltz-Rübenach =

German politician

Wappenschild (heraldic shield) of Freiherr (Baron) engeschlechts derer von Eltz-Rübenach

Kuno Heinrich Franziskus Maria Hubertus Reichsfreiherr und Edler Herr von und zu Eltz-Rübenach (20 November 1904 in Schloss Wahn – 30 January 1945 in Várpalota, Hungary) was a member of the Reichstag of Nazi Germany and a SS-Brigadeführer.

== Life ==
Eltz-Rübenach graduated from high school in Bedburg in 1923 after attending primary school and the humanistic grammar school. From 1924 to 1929, he studied art history, with interruptions and without graduation. He also studied philosophy as well as people and agriculture at the University of Rostock, the Ludwig-Maximilians-Universität München, the Friedrich Wilhelm University of Berlin, Marburg University, and the University of Bonn. Between 1926 and October 1927, Eltz-Rübenach was trained as a pilot at the Sportflugschule Stettin and at the Verkehrsfliegerschule Schleißheim. From 1929 he completed his training in agricultural estate management. In 1932 Eltz-Rübenach took over the family estates in Wahn, Merheim, Rübenach and Kühlseggen.

During his studies in Marburg, Eltz-Rübenach became a member of the Nazi Party on 1 July 1928 (membership number 92,775). Between August 1928 and September 1929, he was also a Sturmführer member of the SA. At the same time he was a member of the National Socialist German Students' League (NSDStB) and was active as a student union leader in Marburg and Bonn and as an NSDStB leader in Gau Hessen-Nassau-Nord. Between 1929 and 1932 Eltz-Rübenach led the NSDAP local group Bonn-Stadt; around 1931 he was also district leader for the district Bonn-Land.

Between 24 April 1932 and 14 October 1933, Eltz-Rübenach was a member of the Landtag of Prussia. After the Nazis seized power, he was elected to the Reichstag in November 1933 from electoral constituency 20, Cologne–Aachen and would retain this seat until his death. Moreover, from 1933 to 1942 he was first deputy of the municipality of Porz-Wahn.

On 8 June 1936, Eltz-Rübenach joined the SS (SS no. 276,592) in the rank of Obersturmbannführer. As of 30 January 1937, he was ranked SS-Standartenführer, and on 26 November 1937, for unknown reasons, honorary proceedings were instituted against Eltz-Rübenach before the "Great Court of Arbitration of the Reichsführer SS". On 22 March 1938, the proceedings were discontinued.

During the Second World War Eltz-Rübenach was called up on 13 November 1939 as the SS standard "Germania," a part of the Waffen-SS in the making. First he was SS-Oberscharführer of the Reserve, then from 12 April 1940 he became SS-Untersturmführer of the Reserve, he took part in the Battle of France in an infantry gun company. Released from the Waffen-SS on 8 June 1940, Eltz-Rübenach was promoted to Obersturmführer of the Waffen-SS two days later.

On 8. November 1943 he was promoted to SS-Brigadeführer. From 10 May 1944, he was the train commander in the Sturmgeschütz Department of the 3rd SS Panzer Division Totenkopf and others in Hungary. Eltz-Rübenach died at the end of the war in a battle in Hungary against the Red Army.

== Sources ==
- Joachim Lilla, Martin Döring, Andreas Schulz: Statisten in Uniform. Die Mitglieder des Reichstags 1933–1945. Ein biographisches Handbuch. Unter Einbeziehung der völkischen und nationalsozialistischen Reichstagsabgeordneten ab Mai 1924. Droste, Düsseldorf 2004, ISBN 3-7700-5254-4.
- Michael Rademacher: Handbuch der NSDAP-Gaue 1928 – 1945. Die Amtsträger der NSDAP und ihrer Organisationen auf Gau- und Kreisebene in Deutschland und Österreich sowie in den Reichsgauen Danzig-Westpreußen, Sudetenland und Wartheland. Lingenbrink, Vechta 2000, ISBN 3-8311-0216-3.
- Ronald Smelser, Enrico Syring, Rainer Zitelmann (Hrsg.): Die braune Elite. 21 weitere biographische Skizzen. Wissenschaftliche Buchgesellschaft, Darmstadt 1993. ISBN 3-534-80122-9.
- Erich Stockhorst: Fünftausend Köpfe. Wer war was im Dritten Reich. blick und bild Verlag, Velbert 1967
- Holger Zinn: Zwischen Republik und Diktatur. Die Studentenschaft der Philipps-Universität Marburg von 1925 bis 1945. SH Verlag, Köln 2002 (Zur Studentenzeit in Marburg)
