= Marinci, Vukovar-Syrmia County =

Marinci
- Location within Vukovar-Syrmia County Location within Croatia Location within Europe
- Coordinates: 45.339854°N 18.900229°E
- Country: Croatia
- County: Vukovar-Syrmia
- Municipality: Nuštar

Area
  - Total: 13.3 km^{2} (5.1 sq mi)

Population (2021)
  - Total: 437
  - Density: 32.9/km^{2} (85.1/sq mi)
- Vehicle registration: VK

Marinci is a village in the Nuštar municipality in the Vukovar-Syrmia County in eastern Croatia located northeast of Vinkovci and southwest of Vukovar. The population is 670 (census 2011).

The village is located on the county road Ž4137 Nuštar-Bogdanovci-Vukovar and its position was strategically important during the 1991 Battle of Vukovar.

Marinci were built on the foundations of an older Roman settlement. A Catholic church of the Immaculate Conception of the Blessed Virgin Mary was built in the center of the village in 1855, demolished in 1992 and rebuilt in 2005.

== Name ==
The name of the village in Croatian is plural.

== History ==
Following Ottoman retreat from the region, the Lordship of Nuštar was established, and the village became part of its domain.
