= Gaboš =

Gaboš Габош (Serbian)
- Village (Selo)
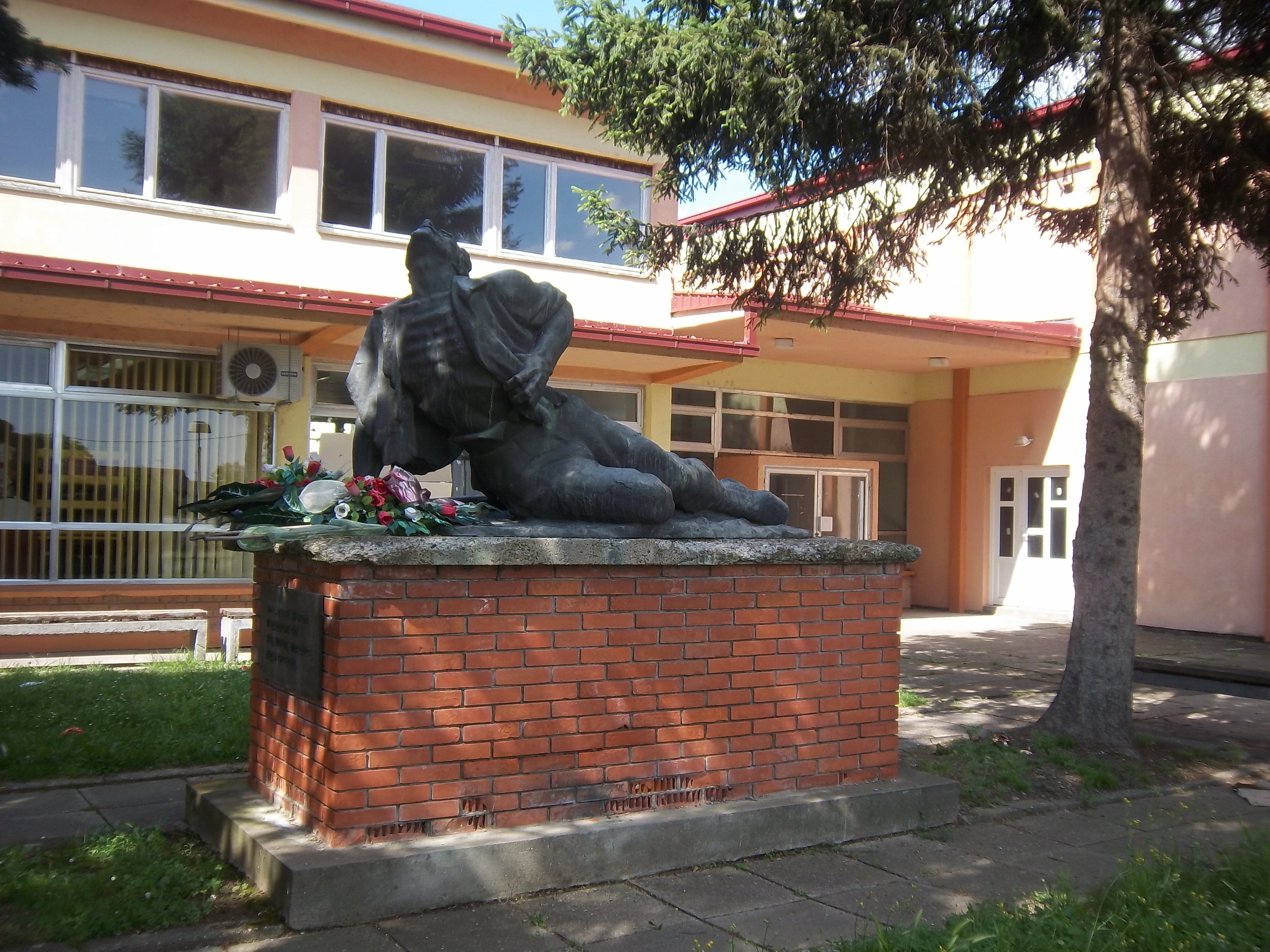

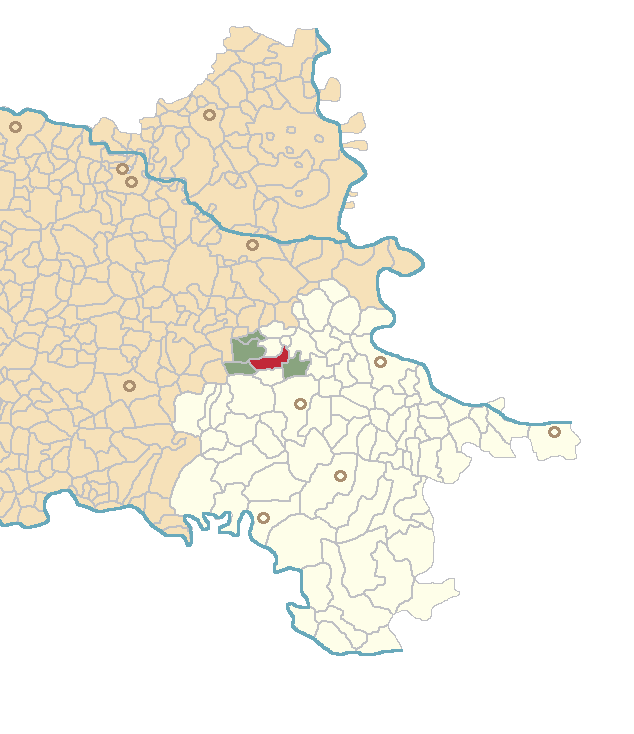

- Location within Vukovar-Syrmia County Location within Croatia Location within Europe
- Coordinates: 45.352°N 18.737°E
- Country: Croatia
- Region: Slavonia (Podunavlje)
- County: Vukovar-Syrmia
- Municipality: Markušica

Government
  - Body: Local Committee

Area
  - Total: 15.2 km^{2} (5.9 sq mi)

Population (2021)
  - Total: 363
  - Density: 23.9/km^{2} (61.9/sq mi)
- Demonym(s): Gabošan (♂) Gabošanka (♀) (per grammatical gender)
- Time zone: UTC+1 (CET)
- Vehicle registration: VK
- Official languages: Croatian, Serbian

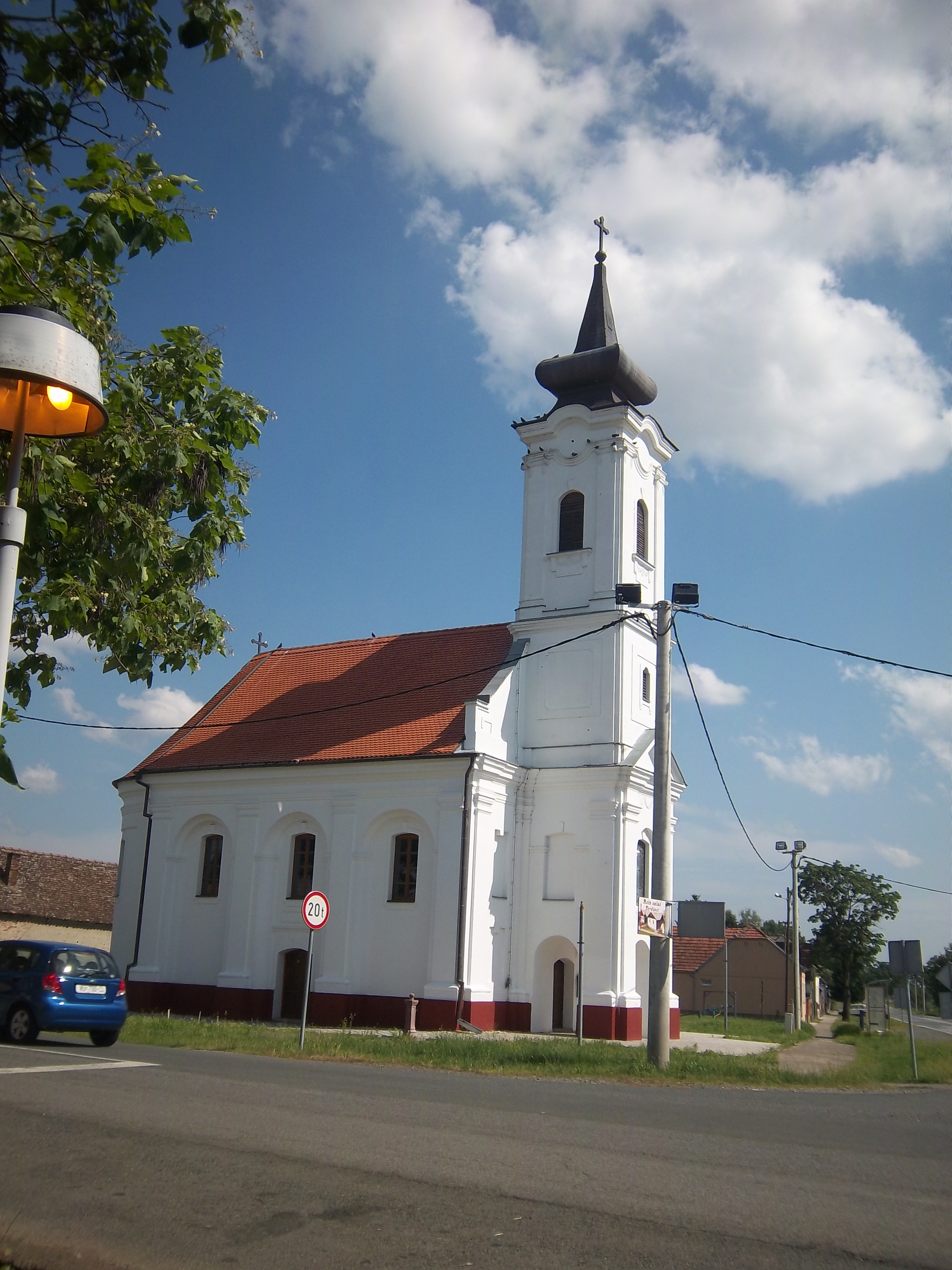
Church of the Nativity of the Virgin Mary, Gaboš

Gaboš (Serbian Cyrillic: Габош) is a village in Vukovar-Syrmia County, Croatia, with a population of 516. The settlement was originally established as a pustara, a Pannonian type of hamlet. Gaboš became a colonist settlement was established during the land reform in interwar Yugoslavia.

== History ==
Following Ottoman retreat from the region, the Lordship of Nuštar was established, and the village became part of its domain.

In July 1943, during the World War II in Yugoslavia, Nazi forces destroyed agricultural machinery, including threshers, across several villages, including Gaboš.

== Education ==
Branch school of Elementary school Markušica is located in Gaboš. Education at local schools is in Serbian.

== Demographic history ==
According to the 1991 census, the village was inhabited by a majority of Serbs (87.66%), and minority of Croats (7.37%) and Yugoslavs (2.27%).

== See also ==
- Markušica Municipality
- Church of the Nativity of the Virgin Mary, Gaboš
