= Vašica =

Vašica Вашица (Serbian)
- Village (Selo)
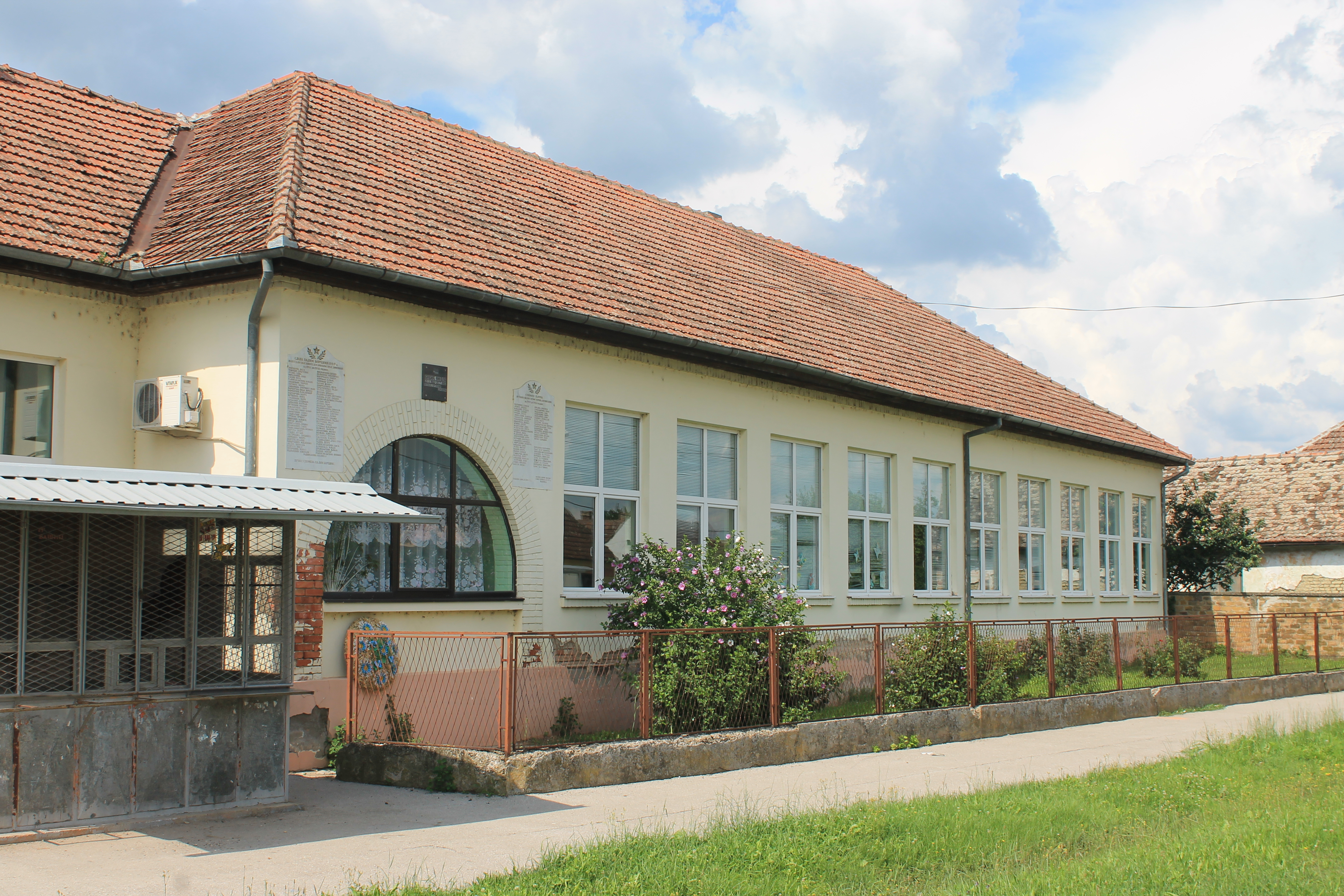

- Location within Vojvodina Location within Serbia Location within Europe
- Coordinates: 45°06′N 19°11′E
- Country: Serbia
- Province: Vojvodina
- Region: Syrmia
- District: Srem
- Municipality: Šid

Population (2002)
  - Total: 1,717
- Time zone: UTC+1 (CET)
  - Summer (DST): UTC+2 (CEST)

Vašica (Serbian Cyrillic: Вашица) is a village in Serbia. It is situated in the Šid municipality, in the Syrmia District, Vojvodina province. The village has a Serb ethnic majority and its population numbering 1,717 people (2002 census).

== History ==
Following Ottoman retreat from the region, the Lordship of Vukovar was established, and the village became part of its domain.

== Demographics ==
Population of Vašica according to the official censuses:

- 1948: 2,065
- 1953: 2,158
- 1961: 2,163
- 1971: 1,963
- 1981: 1,740
- 1991: 1,632
- 2002: 1,717

=== Ethnic groups (2002 census) ===
- Serbs = 1,480 (86,19%)
- Croats = 124 (7.22%)
- Yugoslavs = 40 (2.32%)
- Slovaks = 24 (1.39%)
- Rusyns = 13 (0.75%)
- others

== See also ==
- List of places in Serbia
- List of cities, towns and villages in Vojvodina
