= Nuštar =

- Municipality
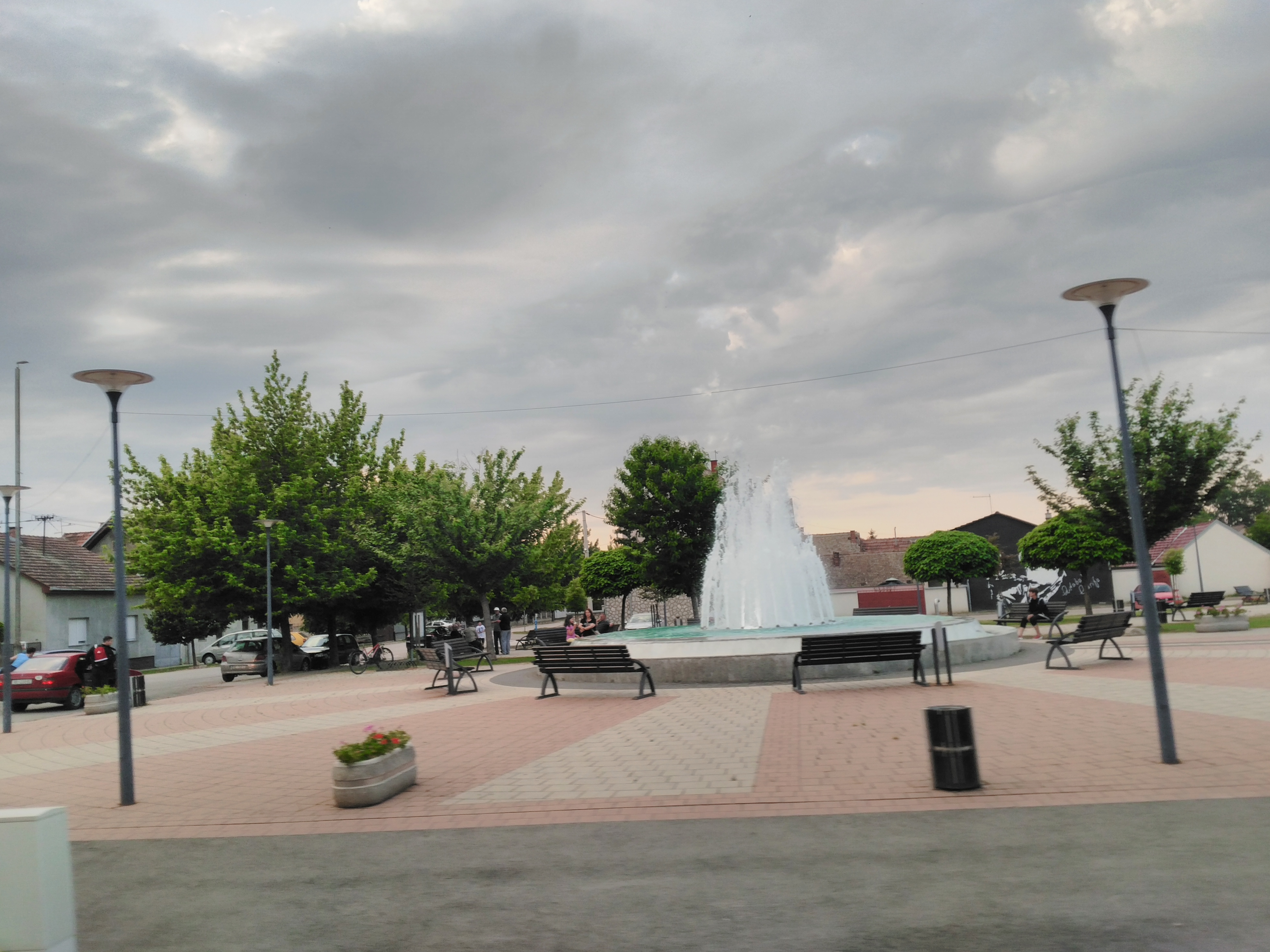

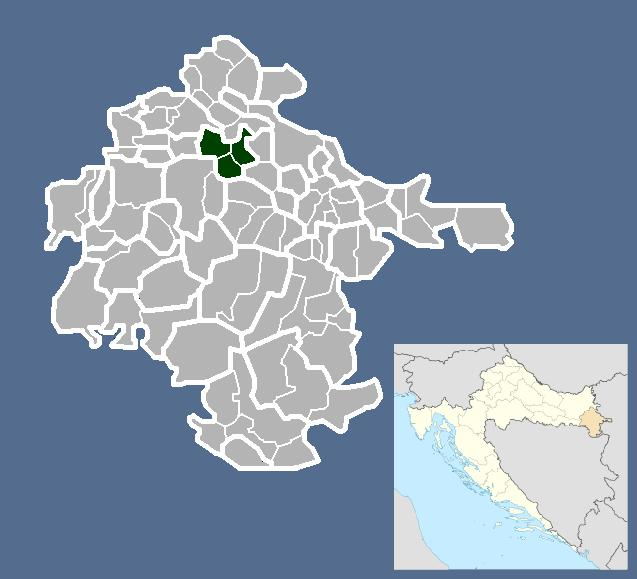

- Location in Croatia Nuštar (Croatia) Nuštar (Europe)
- Coordinates: 45°20′N 18°50′E
- Country: Croatia
- County: Vukovar-Syrmia County

Area
  - Municipality: 43.5 km^{2} (16.8 sq mi)
  - Urban: 16.3 km^{2} (6.3 sq mi)

Population (2021)
  - Municipality: 4,861
  - Density: 112/km^{2} (289/sq mi)
  - Urban: 3,132
  - Urban density: 192/km^{2} (498/sq mi)
- Time zone: UTC+1 (CET)
  - Summer (DST): UTC+2 (CEST)
- Postal code: 32221
- Area code: 32
- Vehicle registration: VK
- Website: nustar.hr

Nuštar (Hungarian: Berzétemonostor) is a village and municipality in eastern Croatia, located northeast of Vinkovci and west of Vukovar, on the route D55. The population of Nuštar is 3,639, with a total of 5,772 people in the municipality, which also includes the nearby villages of Cerić and Marinci (census 2011). Nuštar is underdeveloped municipality which is statistically classified as the First Category Area of Special State Concern by the Government of Croatia.

== History ==
The name Nuštar comes from monasterium, because a Benedictine monastery of the Holy Spirit existed there in 1263. The nobleman Nikola Berzeta acquired the estate in the 14th century, and in the 15th century it was owned by the Gorjanski family. A castle that was owned by the Khuen-Belassy family was expanded and had a church built within it in the 18th century. Following Ottoman retreat from the region, the Lordship of Nuštar was established, and the village became seat of its domains. This church was renovated during the 19th century and the castle is now surrounded by a park. Ban of Croatia-Slavonia Károly Khuen-Héderváry spent most of his childhood at the estate.

Nuštar suffered major damage during the Croatian War of Independence, when it was surrounded by the rebel Serb forces and often shelled. When Vukovar fell in the Battle of Vukovar, Nuštar was the main extraction point for survivors and the village itself became surrounded from three directions. The parish church of the Holy Spirit suffered extensive damage in the war, which has since been repaired.

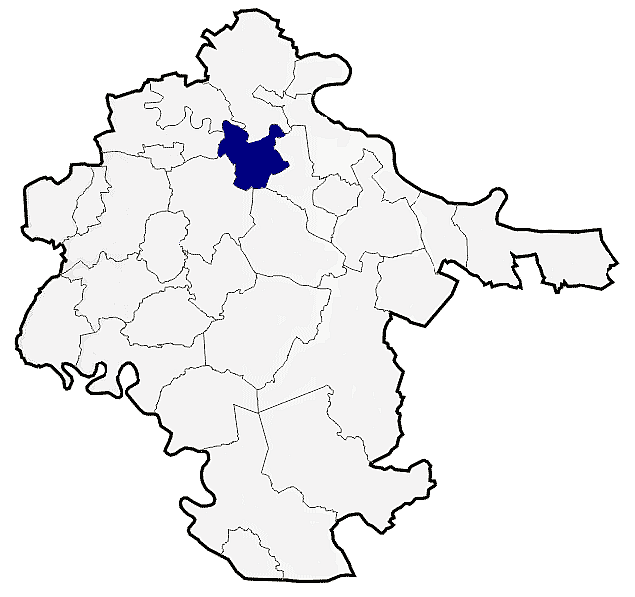
Nuštar municipality within Vukovar-Srijem county

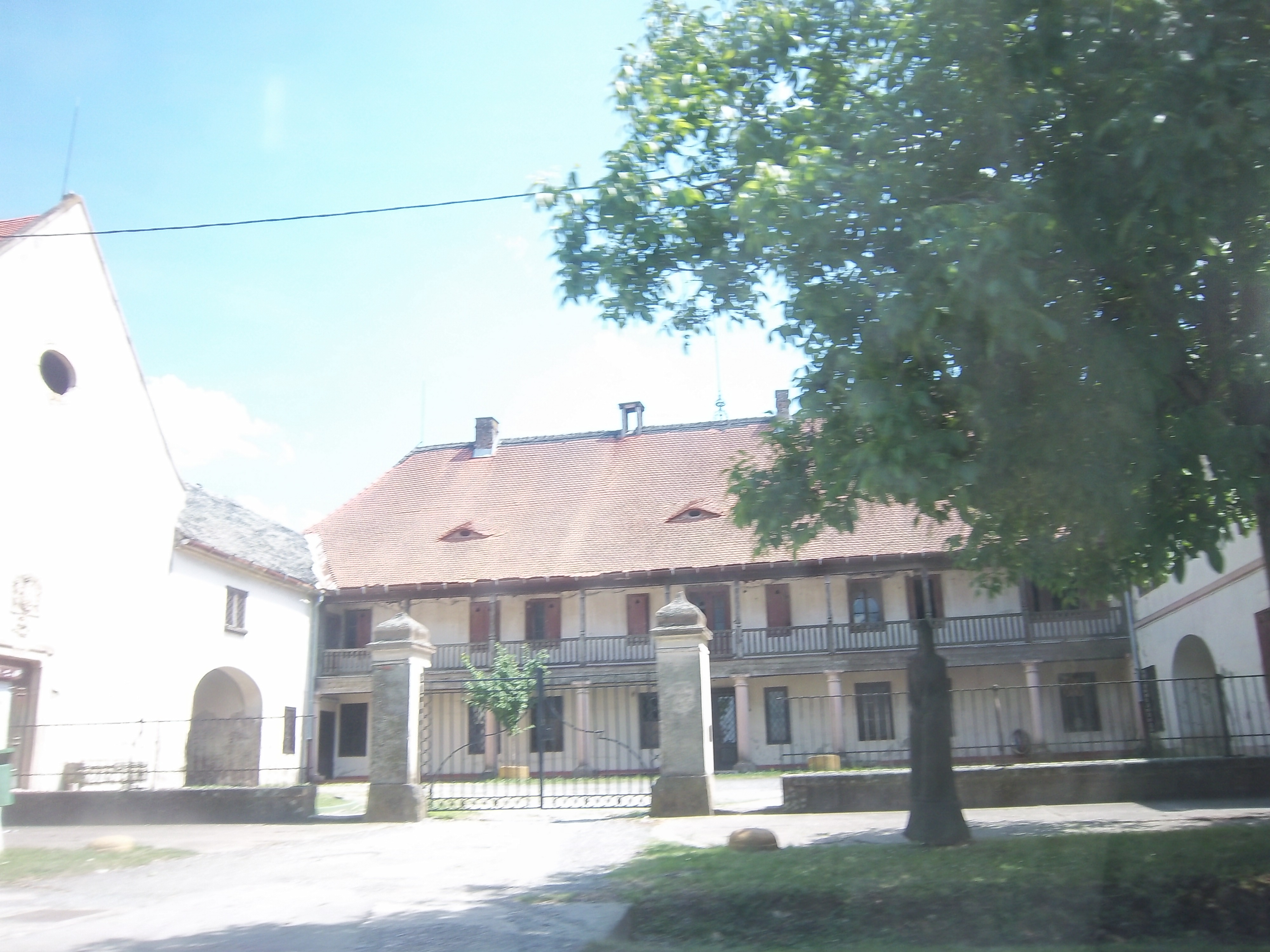
Nuštar castle

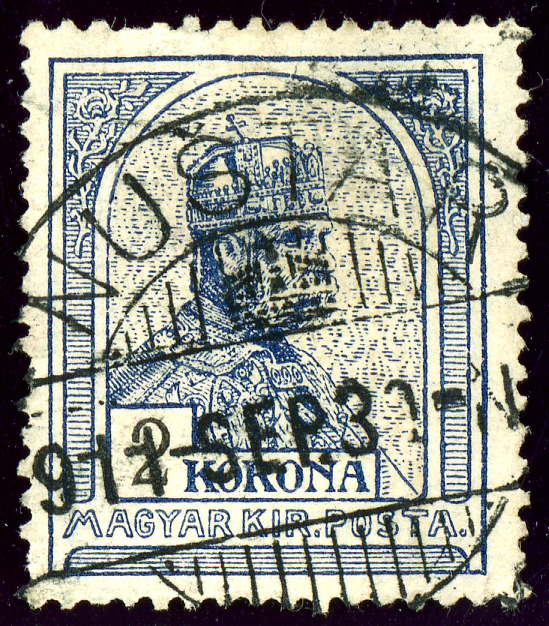
Hungarian Kingdom stamp cancelled at Nuštar in 1911

== Politics ==
=== Minority councils ===
Directly elected minority councils and representatives are tasked with consulting tasks for the local or regional authorities in which they are advocating for minority rights and interests, integration into public life and participation in the management of local affairs. At the 2023 Croatian national minorities councils and representatives elections Hungarians of Croatia fulfilled legal requirements to elect 10 members minority councils of the Nuštar Municipality.

== Literature ==
- Obad Šćitaroci, Mladen; Bojanić Obad Šćitaroci, Bojana; Dundović, Boris (2013). "Manors and Gardens in Northern Croatia in the Age of Historicism" (PDF). Centropa. pp. 175–186. ISSN 1532-5563. Archived from the original (PDF) on 2025-05-05.
