= Elz =

Elz or ELZ may refer to:

== Places ==
- Elz, a village in the market town of Lasberg, Upper Austria
- Elz, locality of Puch bei Weiz, Styria, Austria
- Elz, Hesse, a municipality in Hesse, Germany
- Elz, synonym for the Elzbach river, Rhineland-Palatinate, Germany
- Elz (Neckar), tributary of the Neckar river, Baden-Württemberg, Germany
- Elz (Rhine), tributaries of the Rhine River, Baden-Württemberg, Germany
  - left arm of the Leopold Canal
  - right arm Alte Elz and Kleine Elz at Kenzingen

== People ==
- Kevin Robert Elz, computer programmer

== Other uses ==
- ELZ, IATA airport code for Wellsville Municipal Airport

== See also ==
- Elze (disambiguation)
- Eltz (disambiguation)
