= Church of the Nativity of the Theotokos, Gaboš =

Serbian Orthodox church in Gaboš, Croatia

Church of the Nativity of the Theotokos
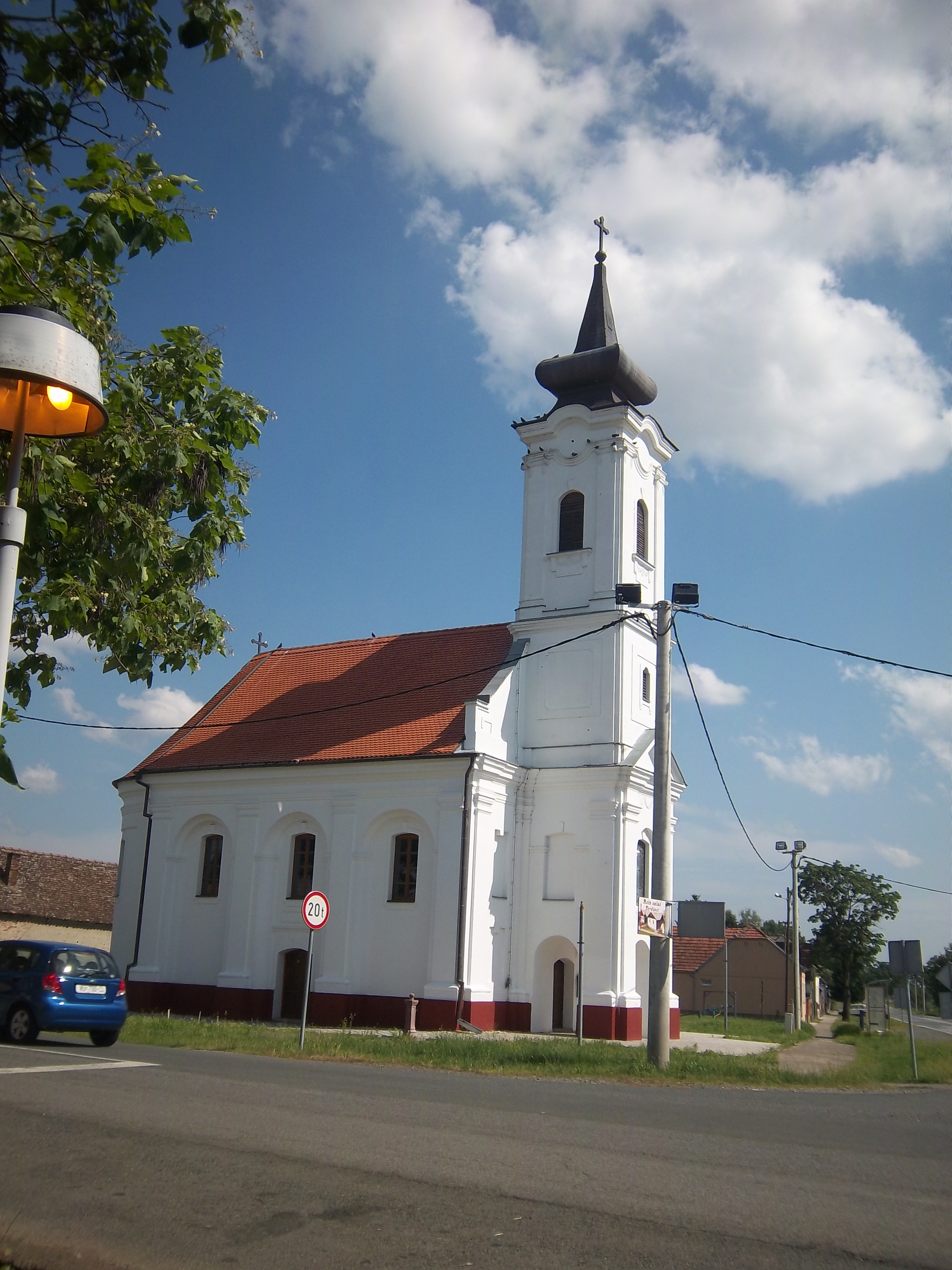

- Shown within Vukovar-Srijem County Church of the Nativity of the Theotokos (Croatia)
- 45°19′5″N 18°50′7″E
- Location: Gaboš, Vukovar-Syrmia County
- Country: Croatia
- Denomination: Serbian Orthodox

History
- Status: Church
- Dedication: Nativity of the Theotokos

Architecture
- Functional status: Active
- Style: Baroque

Administration
- Archdiocese: Eparchy of Osijek Plain and Baranya

Church of the Nativity of the Theotokos (Croatian: Hram rođenja presvete Bogorodice, Serbian Cyrillic: Храм рођења пресвете Богородице) in Gaboš is Serbian Orthodox church in eastern Croatia. The church was damaged during the Croatian War of Independence in 1991 and initial restoration was completed in 1999. New restoration of church in Gaboš were funded by the Ministry of Religion of Serbia, Ministry of culture from Croatia and donations.

== See also ==
- List of Serbian Orthodox churches in Croatia
- Eparchy of Osijek Plain and Baranya
- Serbs of Croatia
