= Lordship of Nuštar =

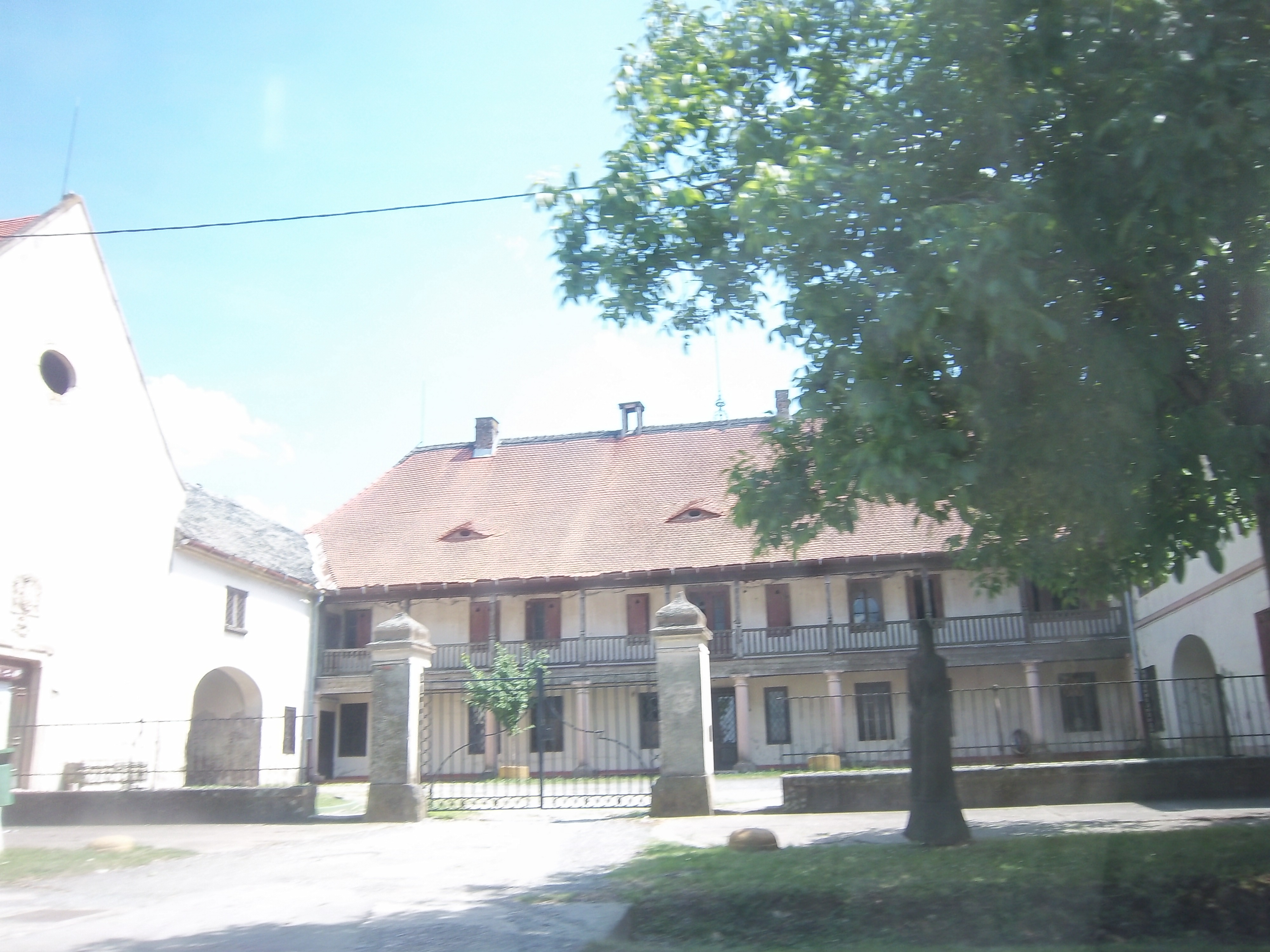
Nuštar Palace

The Lordship of Nuštar (German: Herrschaft Nuschtar, Hungarian: Berzétemonostori uradalom, Serbo-Croatian: Nuštarsko vlastelinstvo, Нуштарско властелинство) was a large land estate, lordship, established in the Kingdom of Slavonia in 1717, following the liberation of the region from the Ottoman rule concluded with the 1699 Treaty of Karlowitz. It covered the area and settlements in and around the village of Nuštar in modern day Croatia. Those villages, alongside namesake Nuštar, were Cerić, Ostrovo, Gaboš, Markušica, Jarmina, Marinci and Lanka.

Feudal lordships in Slavonia covered areas which were not part of the Slavonian Military Frontier, royal free city or under direct royal or eclestical rule. Károly Khuen-Héderváry, ban of the Kingdom of Croatia-Slavonia, spent significant part of his private time at the estate including most of his childhood. During the Croatian War of Independence in 1991, and the manor which was once representative seat of the lordship, was heavily damaged.

== History ==
The area of Nuštar has a long history dating back to the 12th century, when a Benedictine monastery was established in the village, from which Hungarian language name the village name itself is believed to derive. By the mid-14th century, the estate was owned by Nikola Berzete but after his family line died out, ownership passed in 1419 to the noble Garai family. The region subsequently fell under Ottoman control following their expansion into Slavonia.

Ottoman rule ended in 1698, shortly before the formal confirmation of Habsburg control in the Treaty of Karlowitz. At that time, Nuštar was firstly registered as a part of a larger neighbouring Lordship of Vukovar. The territory was then incorporated into the district of Ivankovo, and in 1703 it was granted by Emperor Leopold I to the widow of Ivan Marak for the sum of 11,000 forints.

The Nuštar Lordship was formally re-established in 1717, when the estate was purchased from Baroness Makar by the engineer colonel Maximilian Eugen Count Gosseau de Henef. The following year, he petitioned Emperor Charles VI for permission to expand the lordship to include Vinkovci, which at the time belonged to the Slavonian Military Frontier. In 1736 a peasant uprising erupted across the Nuštar Castle estates. The Nuštar Lordship was later acquired by Baron Franz von der Trenck, but in 1747 it was confiscated and placed under the administration of the Hofkammer. From 1751, the estate was owned by Baron Mihovil Šandor Slavnički, and in 1811 the entire lordship was purchased by Anton II Khuen-Belasi.

== See also ==
- Lordship of Vukovar
- Lordship of Ilok and Upper Syrmia
- Syrmia County
