= Cerić (surname) =

Cerić is a surname. Notable people with the surname include:

- Mustafa Cerić (born 1952), Bosnian cleric
- Tarik Cerić (born 1978), Bosnian footballer
- Larisa Cerić (born 1991), Bosnian judoka
- Semir Cerić (born 1963), Bosnian singer

== See also ==
- Cerić, settlement
- Cerići, settlement
