= Jakob Graf zu Eltz =

Knight of Malta and Croatian politician (1921–2006)

Johann Jakob Eltz
- Born: Jakob Graf und Edler Herr von und zu Eltz-Kempenich genannt Faust von Stromberg; 22 September 1921; Kleinheubach, Bavaria, Weimar Republic
- Died: 10 February 2006 (aged 84); Eltville, Hesse, Germany
- Citizenship: Croatian citizenship, German citizenship - dual citizenship
- Title: Member of Parliament
- Term: 1992–2000
- Spouse: Ladislaja Mayr von Melnhof (m. 1946; died 2006)
- Children: 9
- Parent(s): Count Karl von und zu Eltz-Kempenich; Princess Sophie of Löwenstein-Wertheim-Rosenberg

Jakob Graf und Edler Herr von und zu Eltz-Kempenich genannt Faust von Stromberg, also referred to as Johann Jakob Eltz (Croatian: Jakov grof Eltz-Vukovarski; 22 September 1921 – 10 February 2006) was a Knight of Malta, and a Croatian politician during the 1990s. In Croatia, he was often styled as the count of Vukovar (vukovarski grof). He was President of the Association of Winemakers in Rheingau from 1964 to 1976. Jakob von und zu Eltz was the maternal grandfather of Karl-Theodor zu Guttenberg, a former German Minister of Defence.

== Early life ==
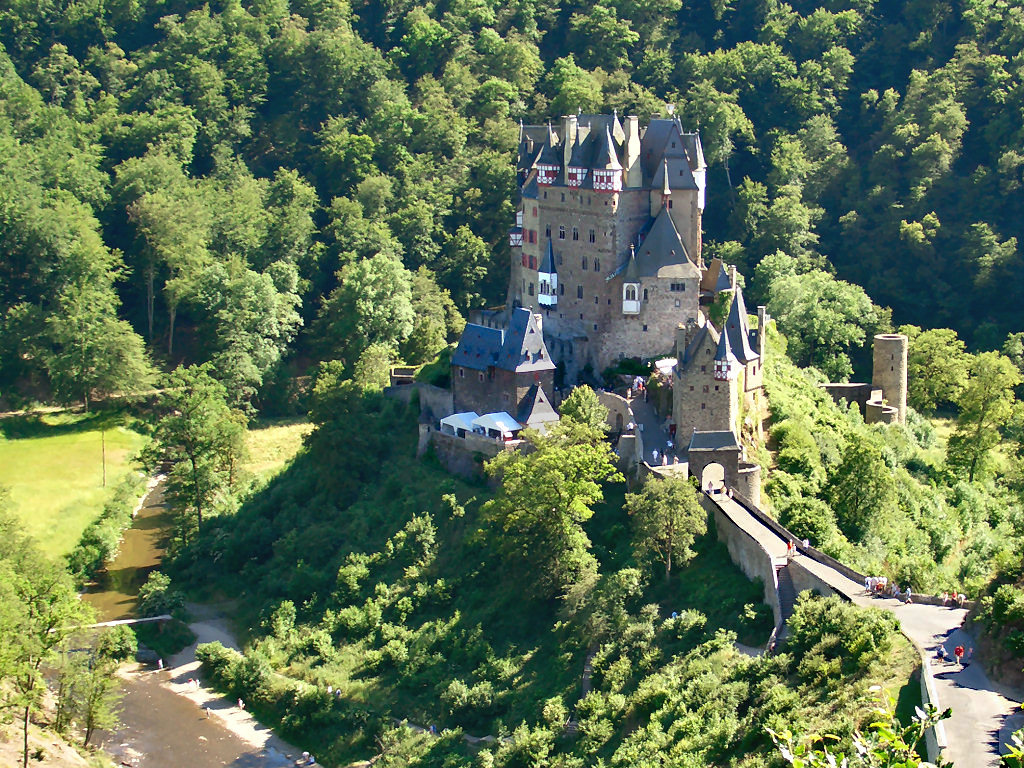
Burg Eltz, the family seat in Rheinland-Pfalz

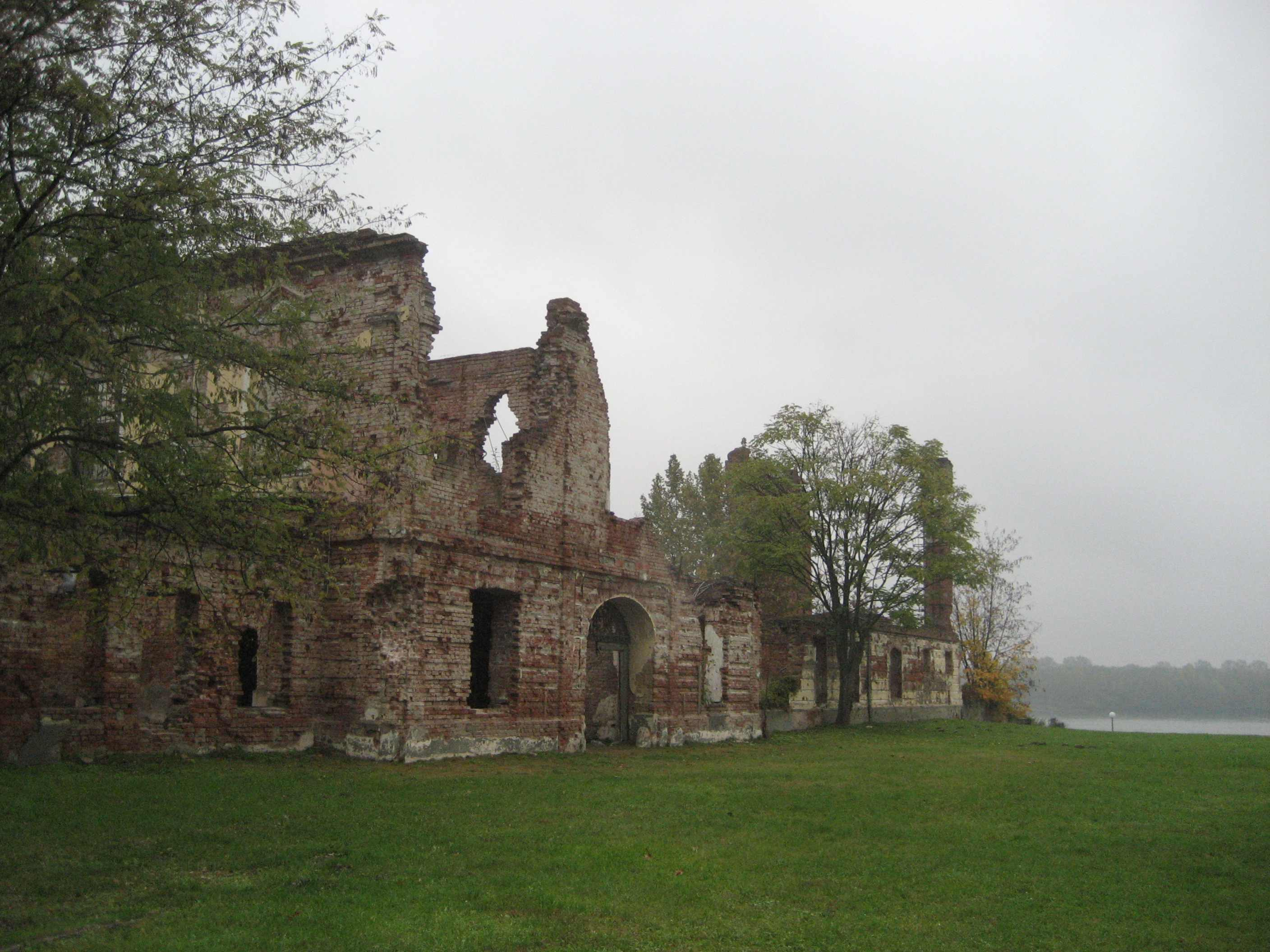
The Eltz Manor in Vukovar was severely damaged by the Yugoslav People's Army during the 1991 Battle of Vukovar, during which Jakob Eltz took part in the defence of the city

Jakob von und zu Eltz was born in Kleinheubach, Bavaria, Germany. The son of Count Karl von und zu Eltz-Kempenich (1896–1922) and Princess Sophie of Löwenstein-Wertheim-Rosenberg (1900–1982). When Eltz was seven months old, his father died in a car crash, and his mother then decided to move to Vukovar, where Eltz spent his childhood and attended private schools. He studied agronomics and went to the study at Zagreb and then Děčín.

He was a member of the eminent Roman Catholic noble Eltz family which had ties to Croatia since 1736, when his family member Philipp Karl zu Eltz (Prince Elector and Archbishop of Mainz) bought the Lordship of Vukovar. The family owned several estates in Slavonia, including the Eltz castle in Vukovar.

== Career ==
Following the end of World War II, when the communists seized power, the Eltz Croatian estates were seized by the state. He then went to live in West Germany, where he studied law, took over the family's winery estate in Eltville, and became a professor of viticulture at Mainz University. He was a member of the Sovereign Council of the Order of Malta and the representative of the order, with the rank as an ambassador, in Germany. He was further known for his charity work and pilgrimages to Lourdes during this time.

He inherited the 800-year-old family seat, Burg Eltz in Rheinland-Pfalz, as the 32nd generation, which he made available to the public for visitation.

=== Politician in Croatia ===
Eltz returned to Vukovar in 1991 after Croatia declared independence from Yugoslavia where he began working with political leaders to help reconstruct the government. In 1991, he was appointed by Croatian President Franjo Tudjman as an honorary representative of the Republic of Croatia in Bonn. That same year, war broke out and Vukovar became the prime target of shelling by the heavily armed Serbs. He was present during the beginning of the Battle of Vukovar helping with the city's defence (the Eltz Manor was destroyed during the battle and the tomb and bodies of the Eltz family desecrated). Due to his popularity, he was persuaded to run for office, and was elected by a large majority to the Croatian parliament in 1992 as an independent candidate for Vukovar. He also became a member of the parliamentary assembly of the Council of Europe where he promoted Croatia's case for joining the European Union.

He continued serving in the Croatian parliament until his retirement in 1999, and was so highly regarded that he was asked to continue as an honorary member in his own right. He spoke six languages: Croatian, German, English, French, Italian, and Latin.

== Personal life ==
In 1946, he married Ladislaja Mayr von Melnhof (1920–2023) in Salzburg. The widow of Prince Konrad of Hohenlohe-Schillingsfürst (a son of Prince Alfred of Hohenlohe-Schillingsfürst), her mother was a Countess of Meran and belonged to a line of the Habsburg-Lothringen dynasty. Together, Jakob and Ladislaja had five daughters and four sons, who married into families like Preysing-Lichtenegg-Moos, Mensdorff-Pouilly and Guttenberg.

He died in 2006 in Eltville Hesse, Germany.

== Honours and awards ==
- Freeman of the Johannes Gutenberg University Mainz
- Knight of the Order of the Golden Fleece
- Maltese National Order of Merit
