= Eltz Manor =

Baroque palace in Vukovar, Croatia

Coordinates: 45°21′27″N 18°59′42″E

- Dvorac Eltz
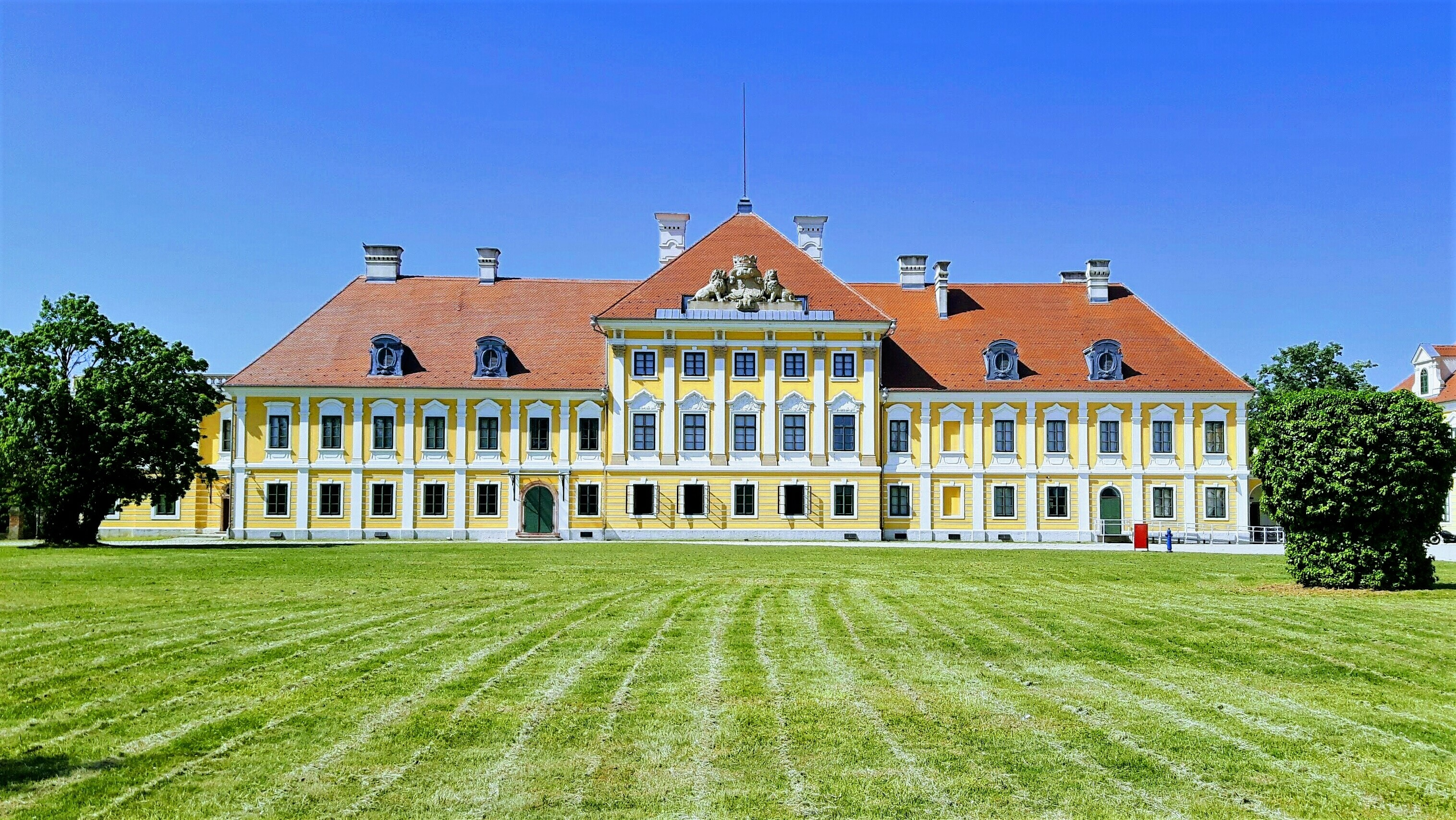
- Eltz Manor after renovation (2012)
- Interactive map of the Eltz Manor area

General information
- Architectural style: Baroque
- Location: Vukovar, Croatia, Županijska 2; 32000 Vukovar
- Current tenants: Vukovar City Museum
- Construction started: 1749
- Completed: 1751
- Renovated: 2008–2011
- Owner: Republic of Croatia

Eltz Manor (Croatian: Dvorac Eltz, German: Schloss Eltz) is a Baroque palace in Vukovar, Croatia. The 18th-century manor is the location of the Vukovar City Museum. The manor, as it previously appeared, was depicted on the reverse of the Croatian 20 kuna banknote, issued in 1993 and 2001. The palace suffered substantial damages and destruction in 1991 during the Croatian War of Independence. However, after four years of restoration, it was completely restored to its pre-war appearance in October 2011. It was the main residence of the Eltz family during the existence of the Lordship of Vukovar.

== History ==
In 1736, Philipp Karl von Eltz-Kempenich (1665–1743), the Archchancellor of the Holy Roman Empire and Prince-Archbishop of Mainz, purchased a Vukovar manor in Syrmia, in the eastern Kingdom of Slavonia, then part of the Habsburg monarchy ruled by Emperor Charles VI. The palace was originally built between 1749 and 1751 by the Archchancellor's descendants of the German Catholic noble House of Eltz and was gradually extended over time. The Lordship of Vukovar estates near the Military Frontier were, however, exposed to raids by Ottoman troops and local Hajduk paramilitary forces.

After the Yugoslav Partisans gained control over the country in late World War II, the manor was confiscated by the communist administration of Yugoslavia in 1944, and the family of Jakob Graf zu Eltz was forced to leave Vukovar. In 1990, he returned from Eltville to the newly established state of Croatia and became a member of the Sabor parliament in Zagreb. Eltz Manor, however, suffered a great deal of damage during the Croatian War of Independence, when it was bombarded by the Yugoslav People's Army during the Battle of Vukovar.

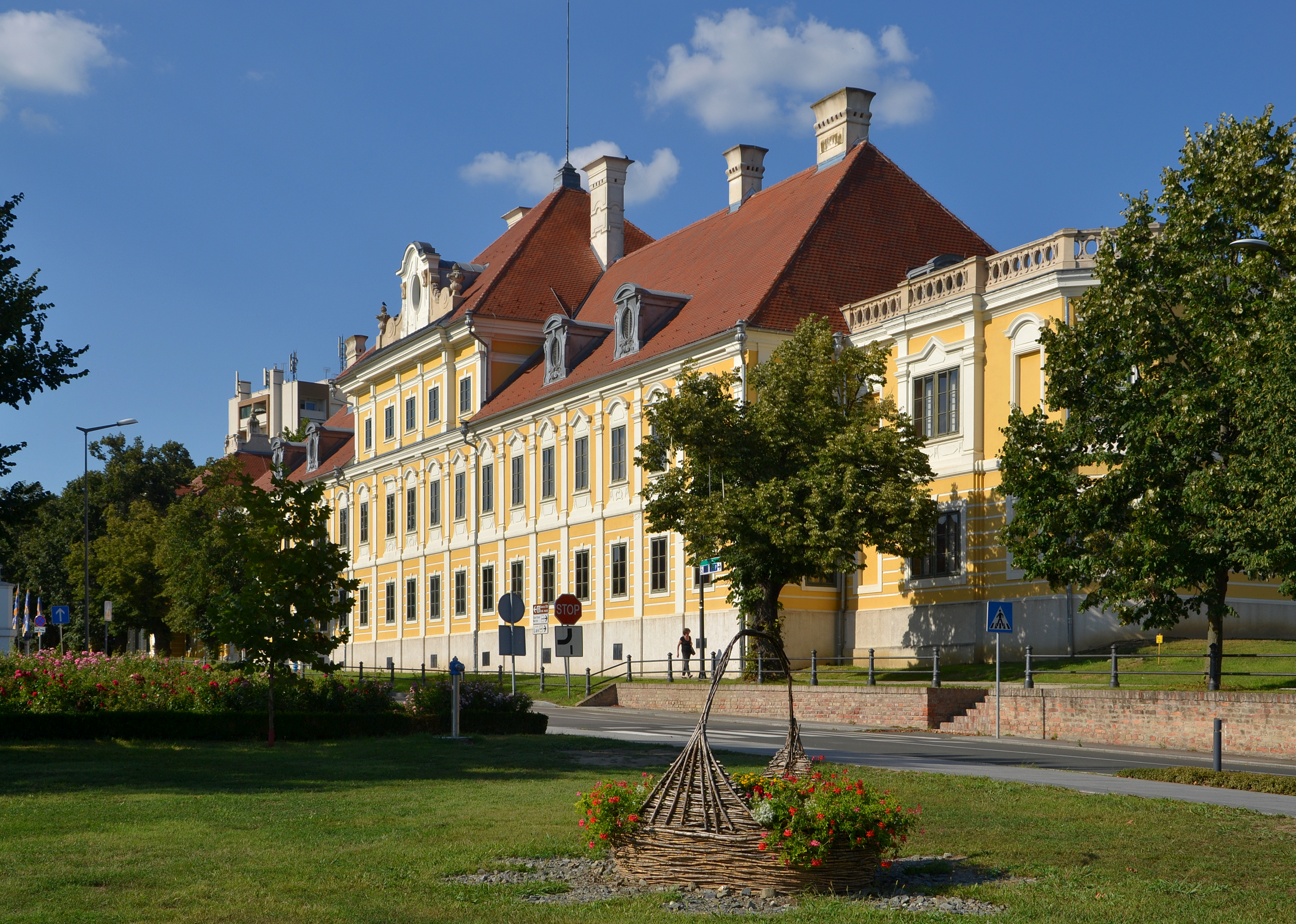
After renovation in 2011

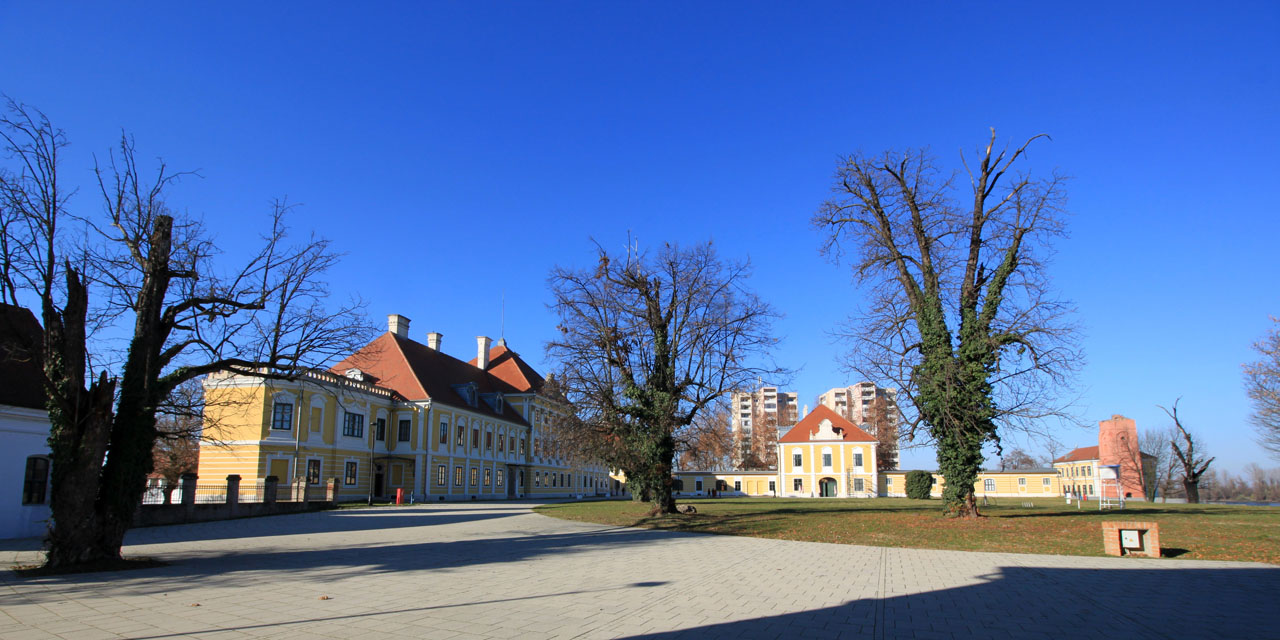
The courtyard facade and the garden

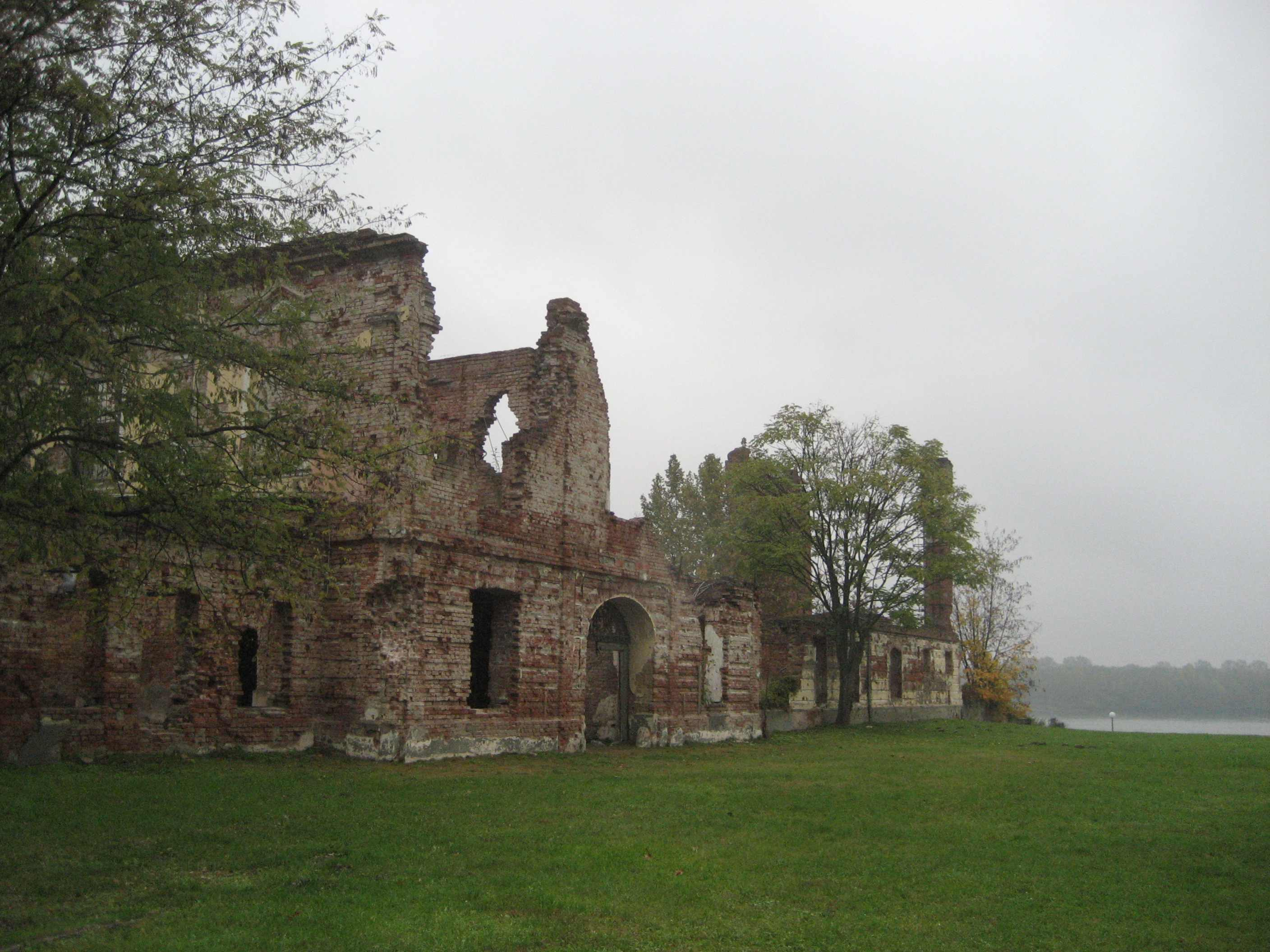
Damaged right part of the Baroque palace before the renovation

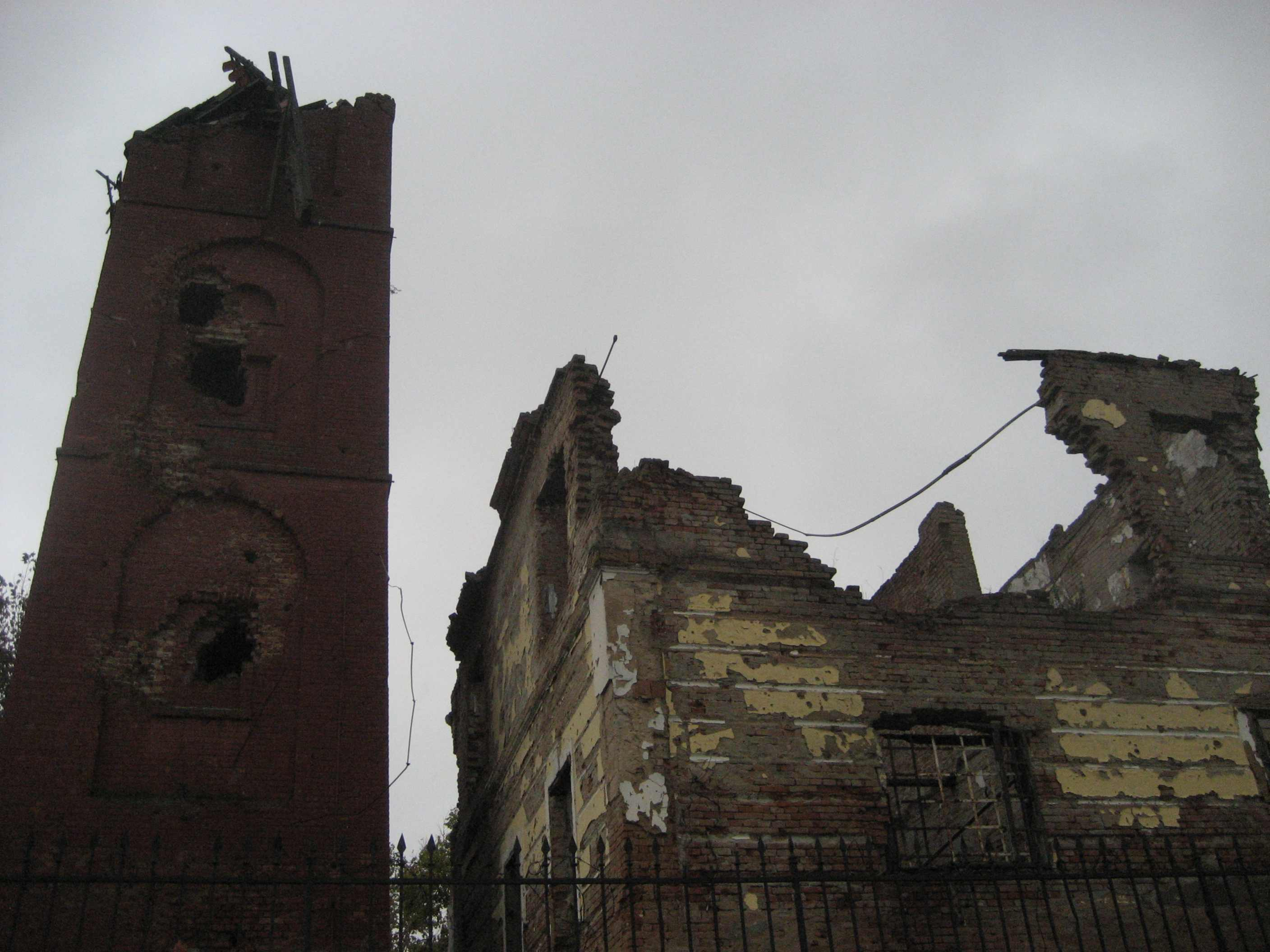
Damaged tower and destroyed Baroque palace, before renovation

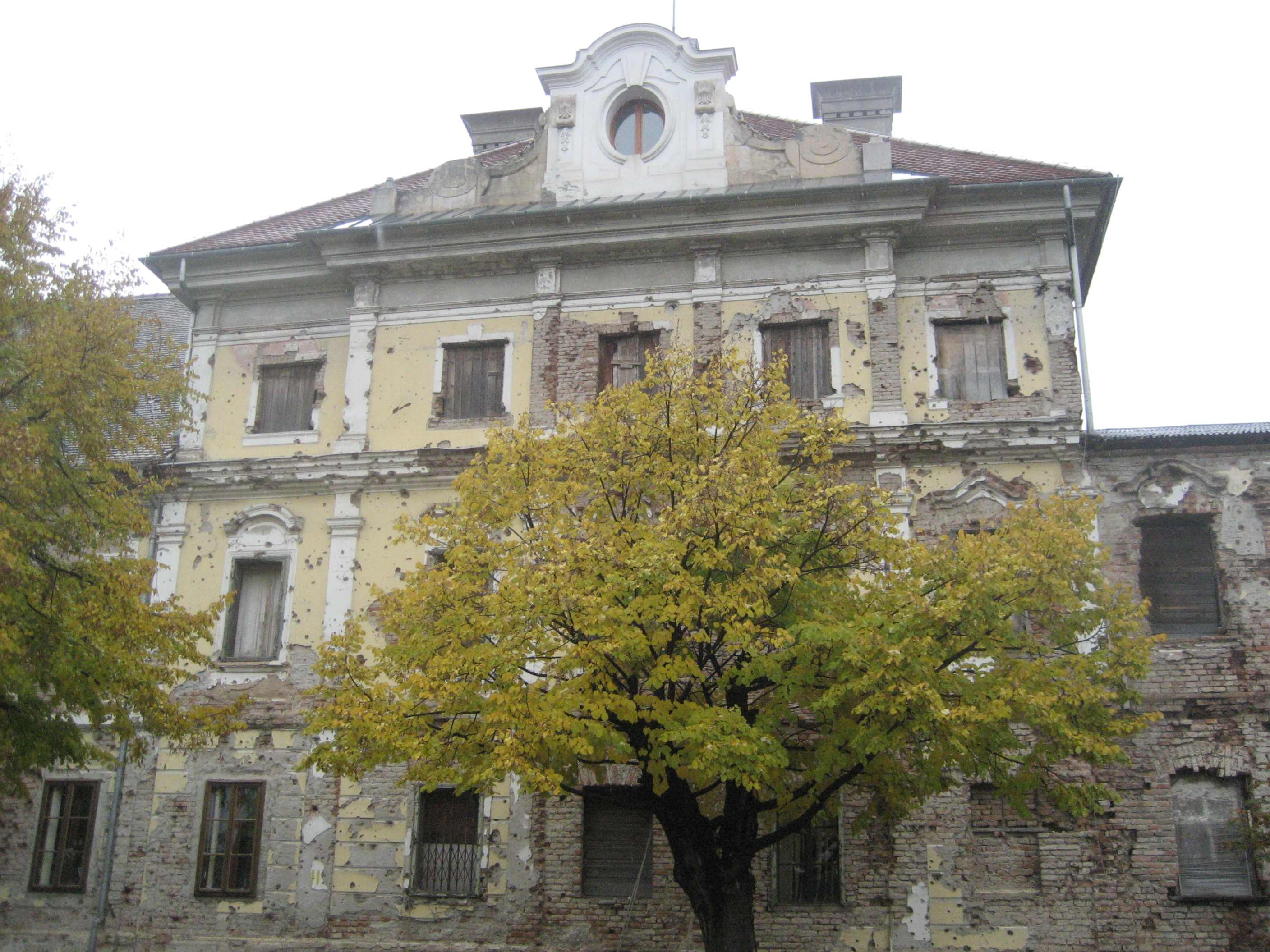
Damaged main facade, before renovation

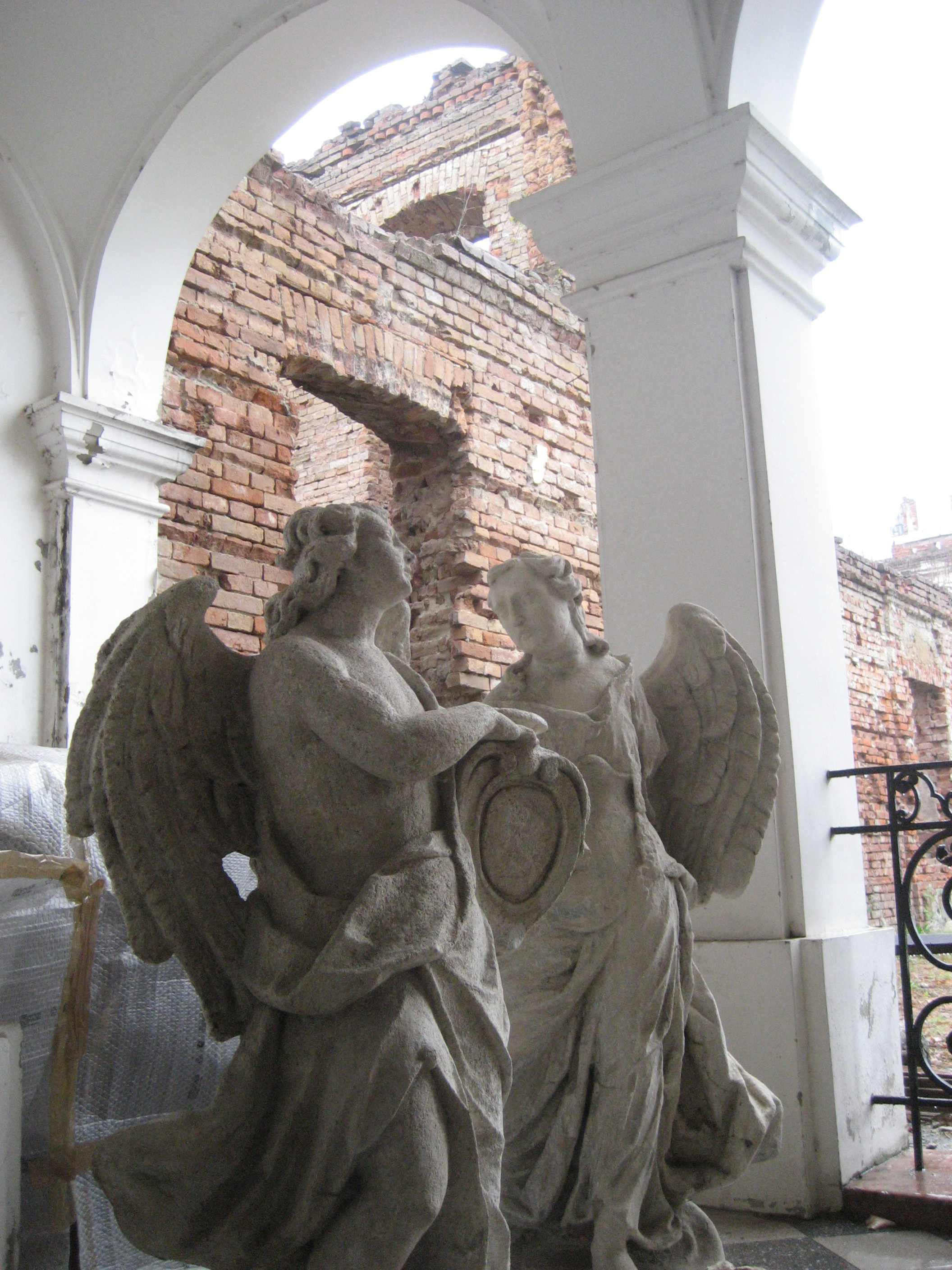
Statues of angels in a heraldic setting, with ruins in the background, before renovation

== See also ==
- List of Baroque residences
- Palace of Syrmia County
