= House of Eltz =

German noble family

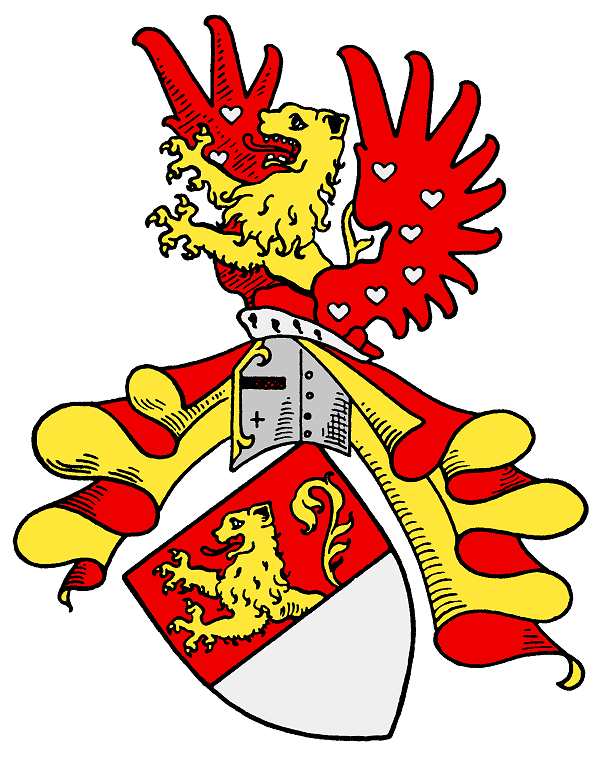
Coat of arms

The House of Eltz is an old and prominent German noble family, belonging to the Uradel. The Rhenish dynasty has had close ties to the Kingdom of Croatia-Slavonia since 1736.

== History ==
Though older sources mentioned one Eberhard zu Eltz, a Frankish citizen of Trier in the late 7th century, the otherwise first recorded instance of the name occurred in 1157, when Rudolph zu Eltz was mentioned as witness to the donation of a property deed by Emperor Fredrick Barbarossa. At that time, Eltz lived in a small manor on the banks of the River Elz, a tributary of the Moselle, in what is now the German state of Rhineland-Palatinate. The family members had been ministeriales and loyal supporters of the Imperial Hohenstaufen dynasty.

In the early 14th century they inherited the Vogtei over Rübenach near Koblenz, a possession of Imperial Abbey of St Maximin at Trier. Eltz Castle was built in the early 12th century on a site that held a 9th-century manor house with a simple earthwork palisade. Before 1268 three brothers shared the ownership of the castle and it was kept jointly by their descendants, the Kempenich, Rodendorf and Rübenach branches until 1815 when it was taken over by the Kempenich branch, which still owns it today.

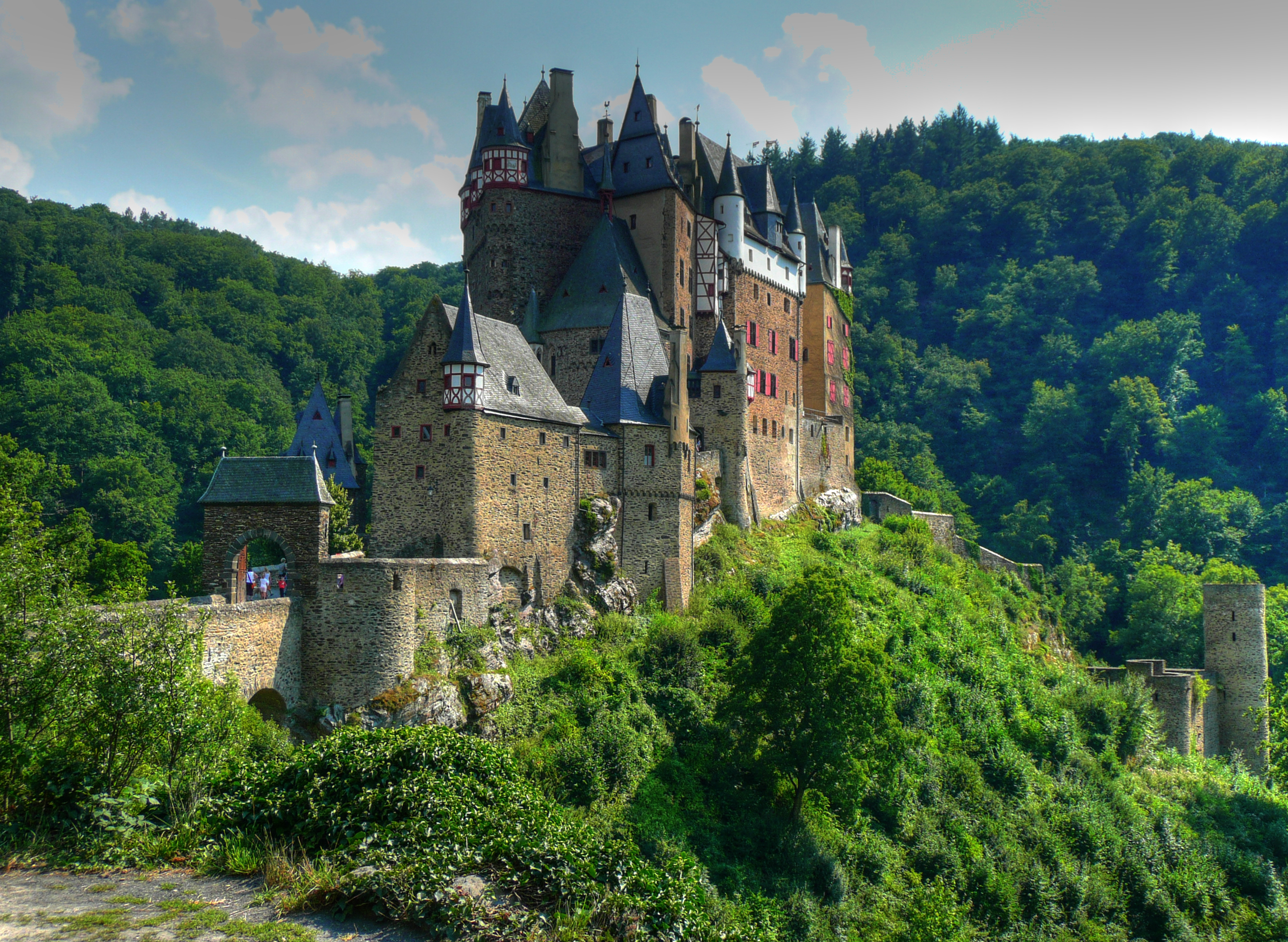
Eltz Castle, owned by the family since before 1157

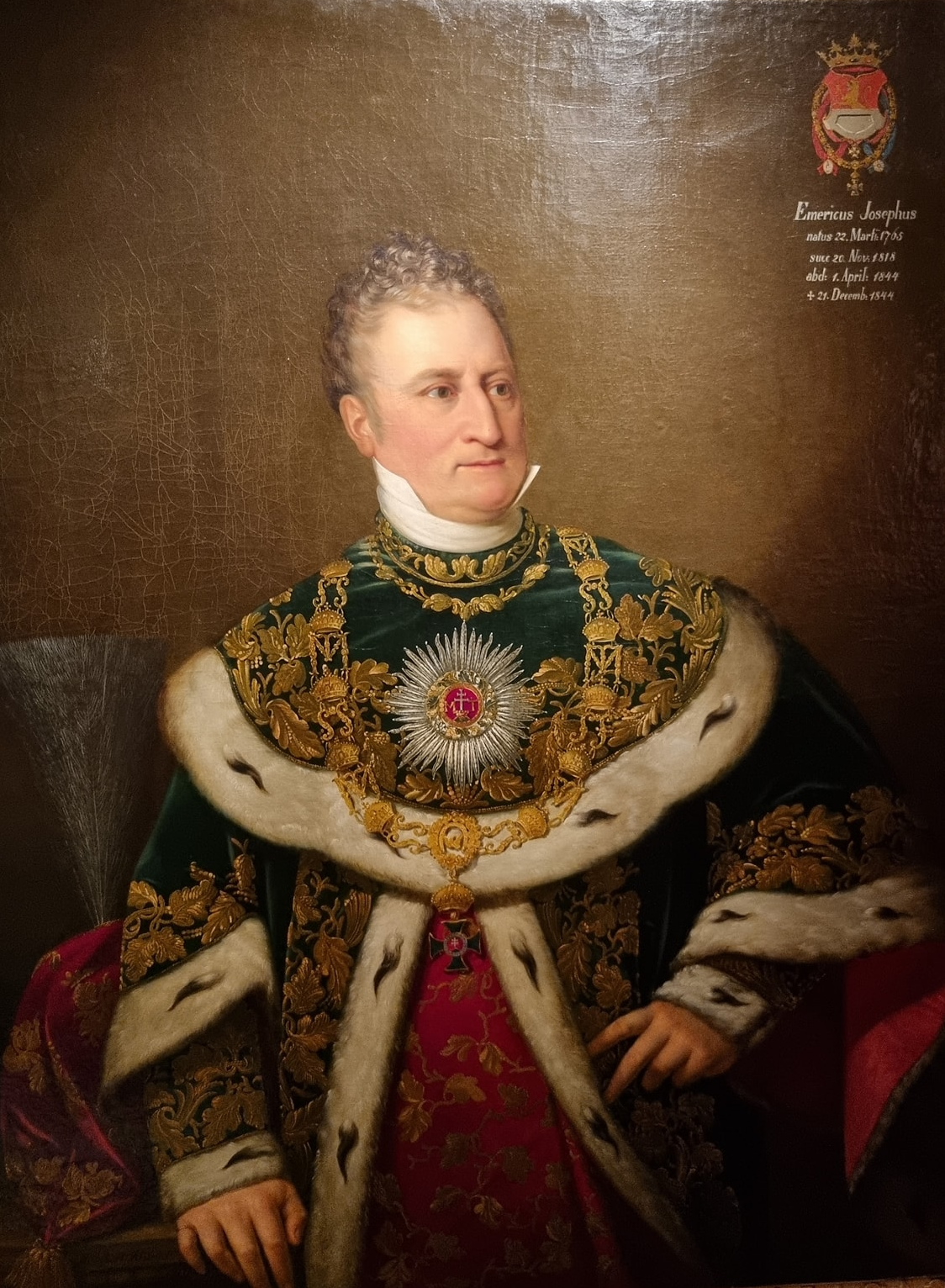
Count Emerich von und zu Eltz

From 1331 until 1336 the Eltz were stuck in a fierce feud with the mighty Baldwin of Luxembourg, then Elector and Prince-Archbishop of Trier enforcing his acknowledgement as their suzerain, whereafter the Eltz family remained vassals of the Trier archbishops. In 1324 Pope John XXII had appointed Canon Arnold von Eltz Prince-Bishop of Cammin in Pomerania against the resistance of King Louis IV. Robin von Eltz served as Master of the Livonian Order from 1385 until 1389. Canon Jakob zu Eltz was elected Prince-Archbishop of Trier in 1567; he was one of the strongest champions of the Counter-Reformation and allied himself with the Jesuits in opposing Lutheran and Calvinist influence in the region.

In 1624, Hans Jakob zu Eltz was given the hereditary office of Field Marshal for the Electorate of Trier. This made him the supreme military commander of the region in time of war, including leader of the vassals on this important region of the Holy Roman Empire.

The Eltz family, Imperial Knights since 1729, reached their greatest influence with Philipp Karl von Eltz-Kempenich, from 1732 Prince Elector and Archbishop of Mainz and German Archchancellor, making him the most noble and one of the most powerful Catholic princes north of the Alps. As a result of their service throughout the troubles of the Reformation and during the wars against the Ottoman Empire, the elder line of Eltz were awarded the title of Reichsgrafen (Counts of the Empire) by the Habsburg Emperor Charles VI in 1733 in Vienna.

The additional "Great Palatinate" (Große Pfalzgrafschaft) privilege entitled the Eltz lords to knight others in the name of the Emperor, select notaries public, legitimate illegitimate children, confer coats of arms and crests, appoint judges and clerks, and release serfs from service.

In 1736 Archbishop Philipp Karl von Eltz had acquired the Lordship of Vukovar in eastern Slavonia (present-day Croatia) affiliated with the Hungarian nobility. From 1749 onwards his heirs had Eltz Manor erected, the main residence of the Grafen von und zu Eltz until the family was expelled by the Yugoslav communist regime in 1945.

After Croatia declared independence from Yugoslavia, Jakob Eltz returned to Croatia and as a naturalized citizen became a member of the new Sabor parliament, where he represented Vukovar, the seat of his former Eltz Manor.

== Properties ==
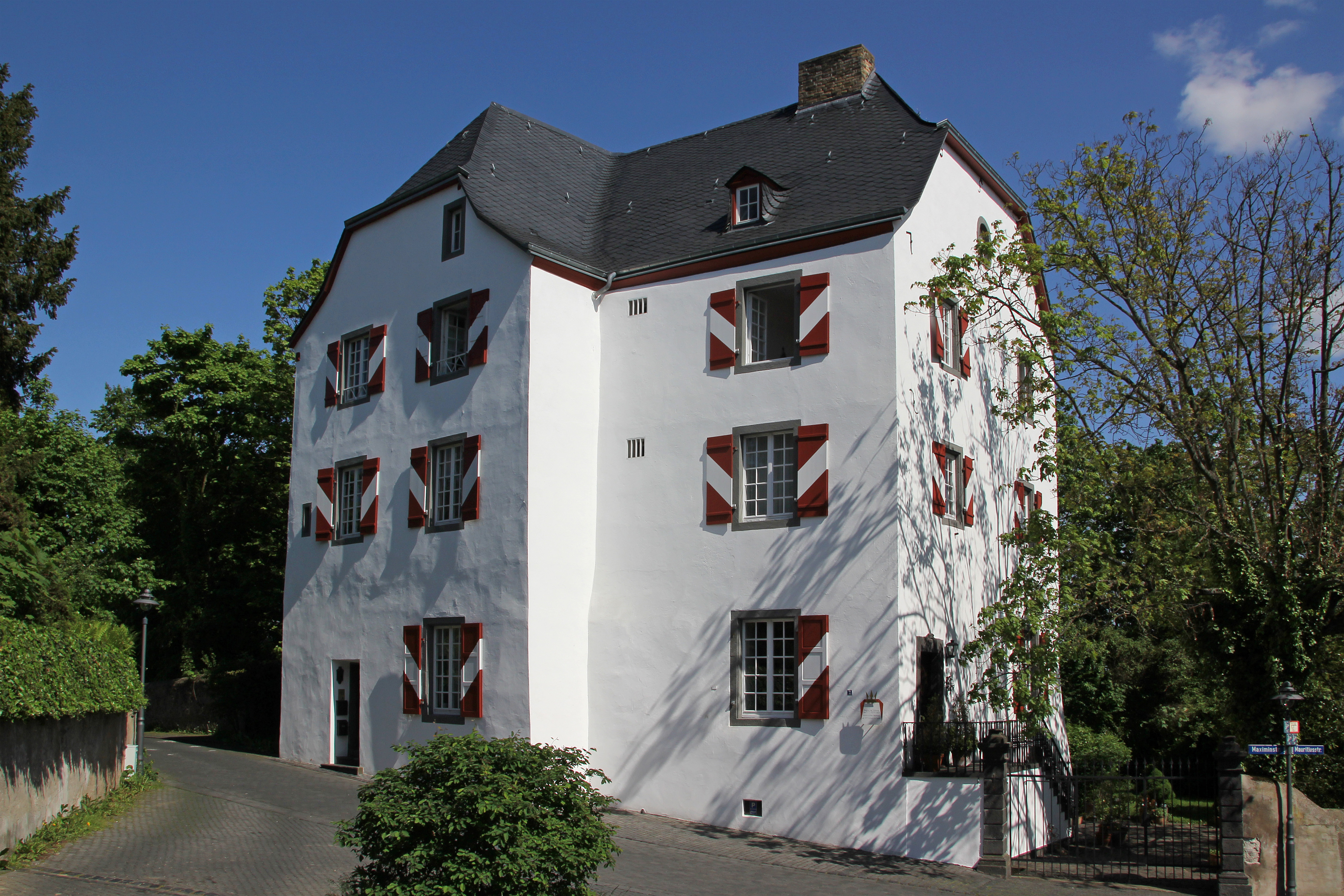
Eltz House in Rübenach near Koblenz, since 1316 owned by the Rübenach branch

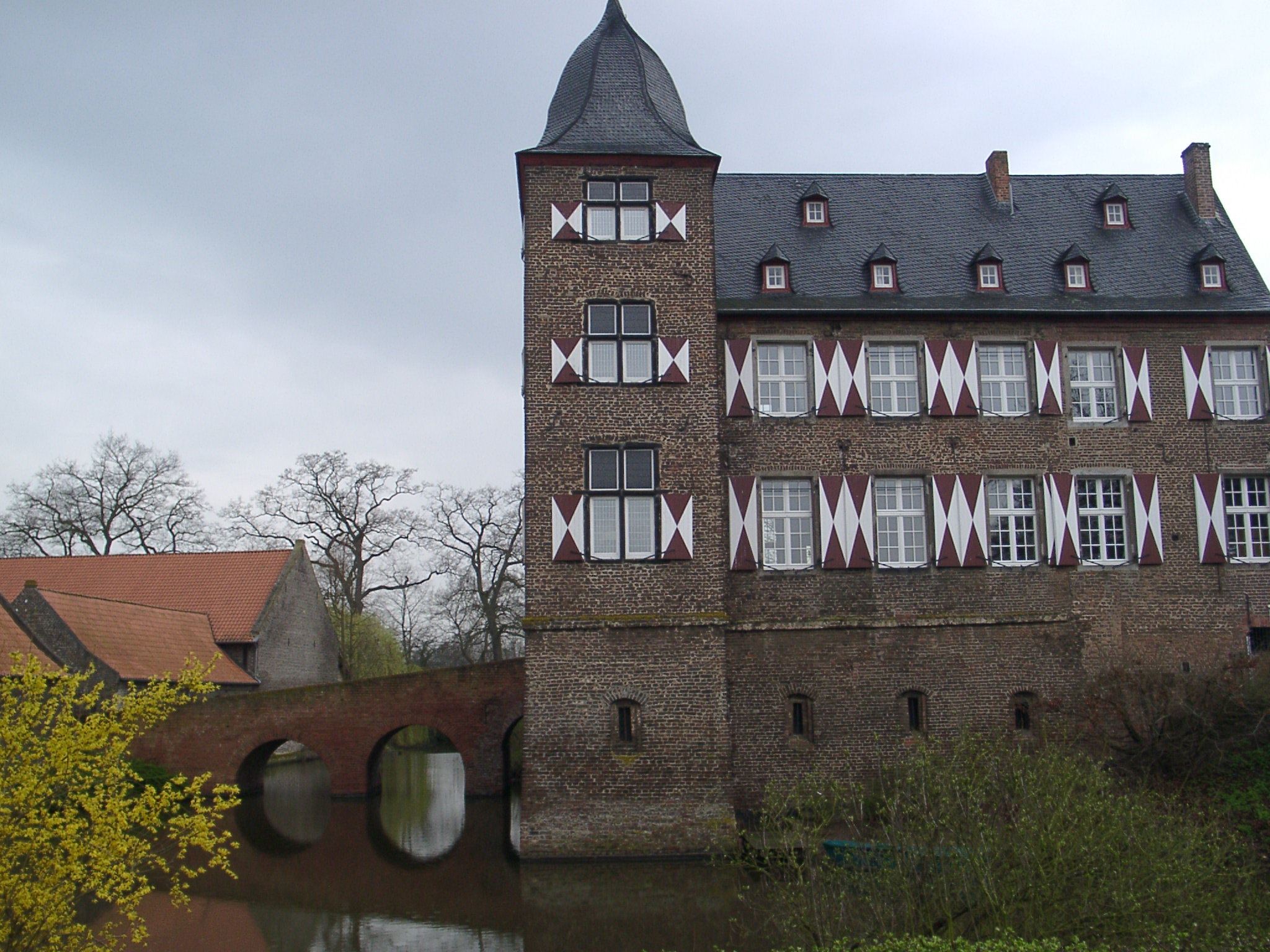
Kühlseggen Castle, since 1836 owned by the Rübenach branch

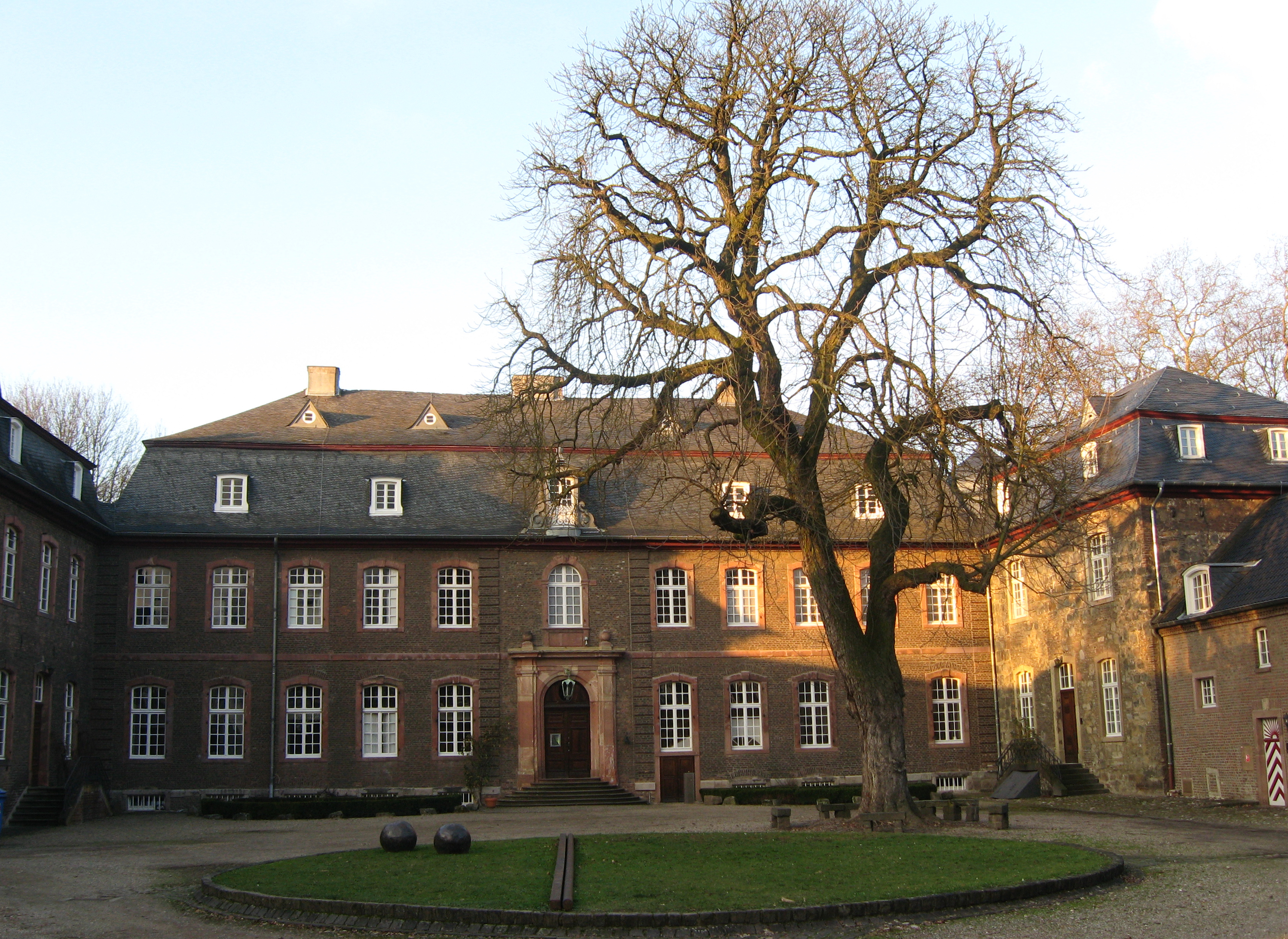
Wahn Castle, since 1820 owned by the Rübenach branch

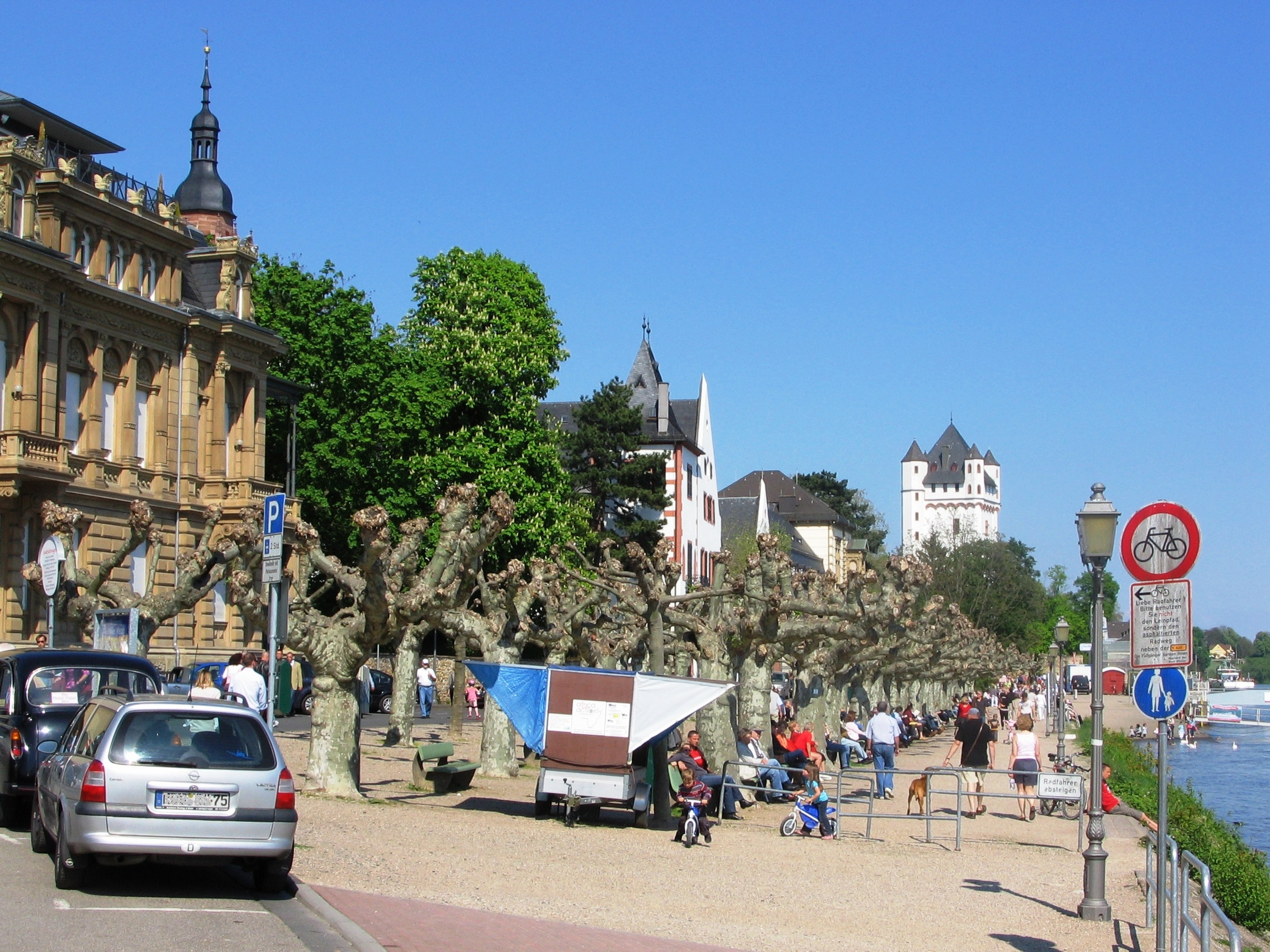
Eltzer Hof (center) at Eltville on the banks of the Rhine, since 1629 owned by the Kempenich branch

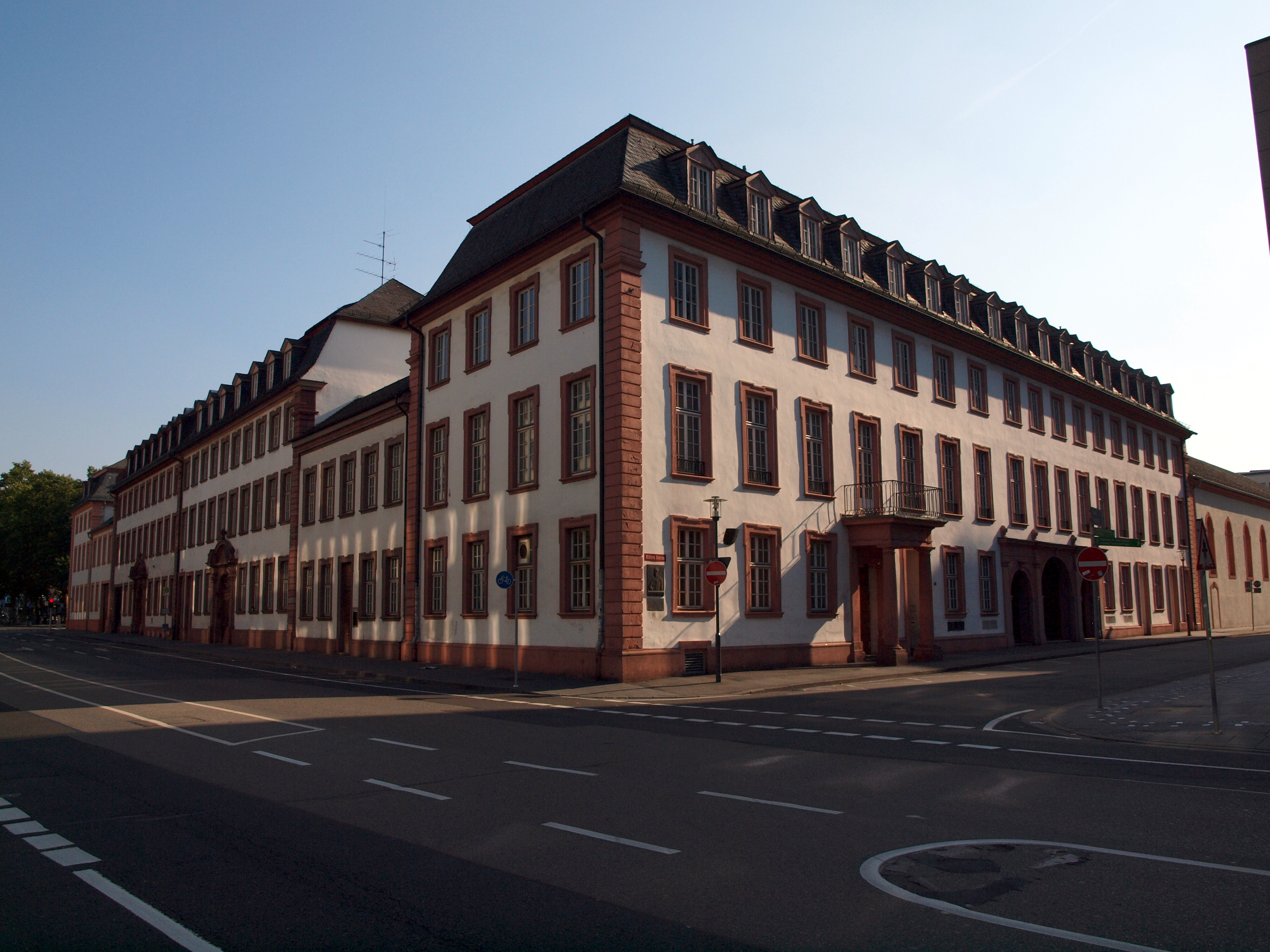
The former Eltz House at Mainz, formerly Eltz-Kempenich

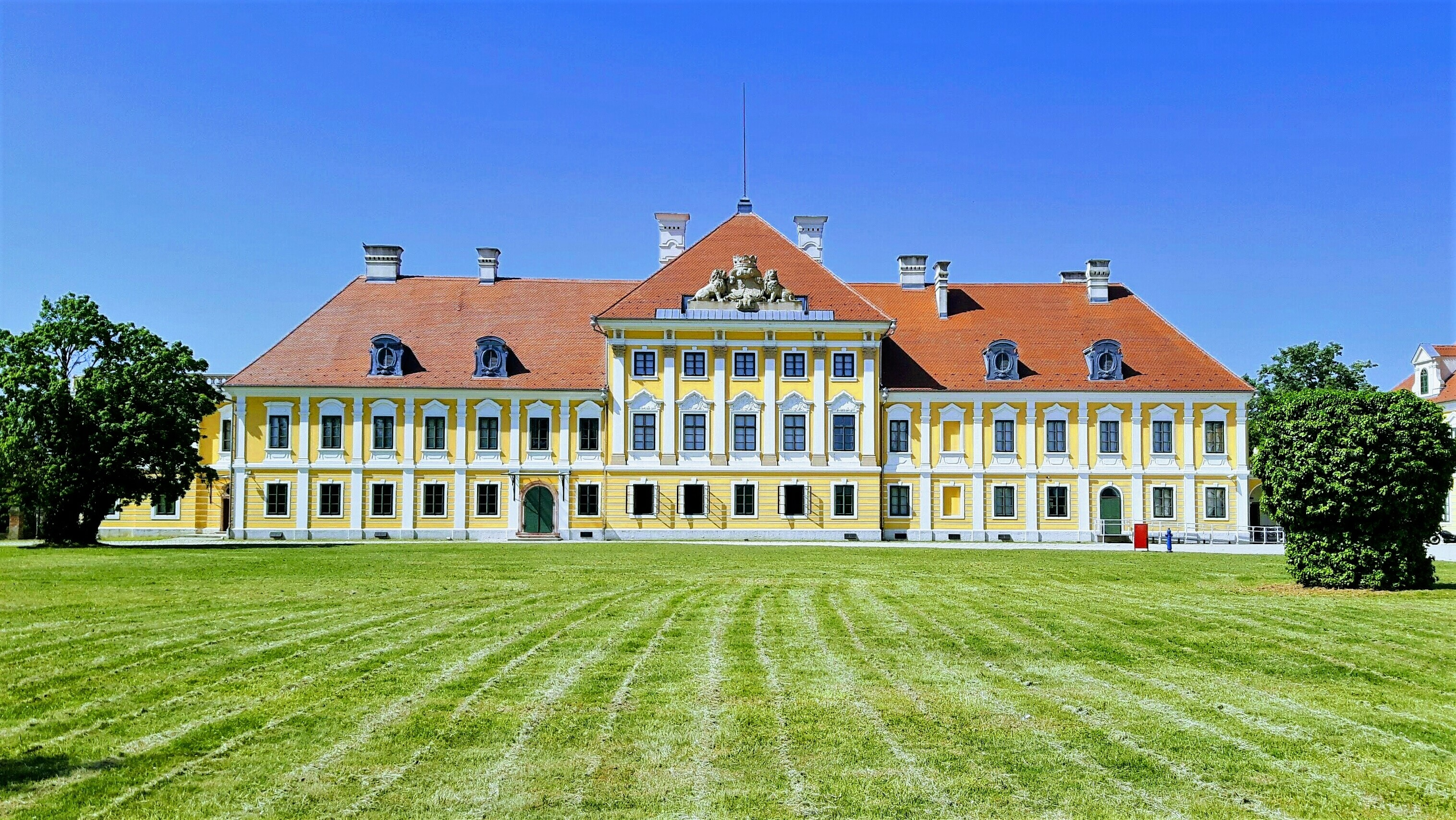
Eltz Manor at Vukovar/Croatia, formerly Eltz-Kempenich

== Notable members ==
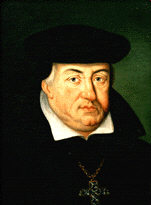
Jakob von Eltz-Rübenach (1510-1581), Prince Elector and Archbishop of Trier from 1567

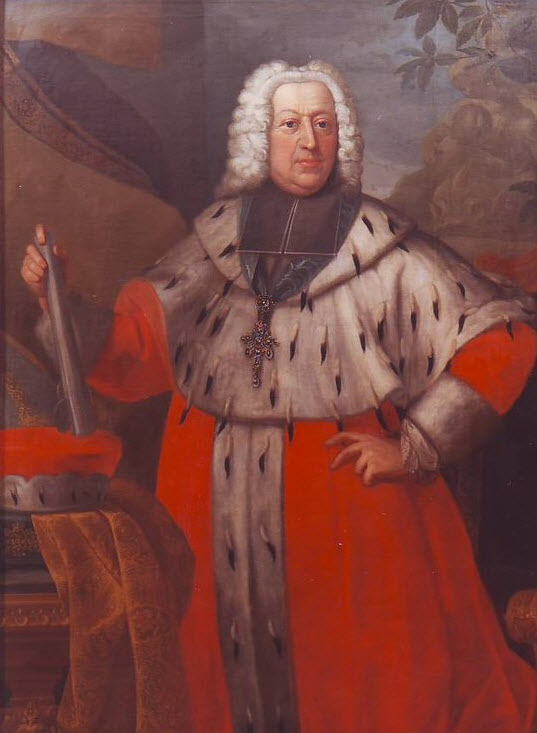
Philipp Karl von Eltz-Kempenich (1665-1743), Prince Elector and Archbishop of Mainz from 1732
- Paul Freiherr von Eltz-Rübenach (1875-1943), Reich Minister of Mail and Transport from 1932 until 1937

== See also ==
- Eltz Castle
- Eltz Manor
