= Philipp Karl von Eltz-Kempenich =

- Archbishop of Mainz
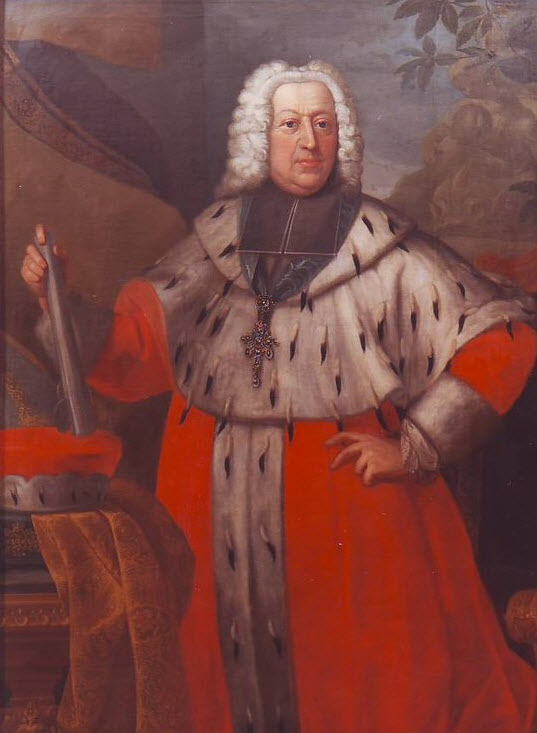
- Church: Catholic Church
- Diocese: Electorate of Mainz
- In office: 1732–1743

Personal details
- Born: 26 October 1665
- Died: 21 March 1743 (aged 77)

Philipp Karl von Eltz-Kempenich (26 October 1665 – 21 March 1743) was Archbishop-Elector of Mainz from 1732 to 1743.

== Biography ==
Philipp Karl von Eltz-Kempenich was born at Burg Eltz on 26 October 1665. In 1686, he enrolled in the Collegium Germanicum in Rome and received a substantial theological education. He later became a canon of Mainz Cathedral and later also of Trier Cathedral.

Christoph Nebel was ordained as a priest in Mainz on 3 June 1731. On 9 September 1732 the cathedral chapter of Mainz Cathedral chose him to be Archbishop of Mainz. Pope Clement XII confirmed this appointment on 3 September 1732. Archbishop of Trier Franz Georg von Schönborn consecrated Philipp Karl von Eltz-Kempenich as a bishop on 16 November 1732.

In 1733, shortly after he became archbishop, the War of the Polish Succession began, pitting the Kingdom of France against the Habsburg monarchy. Philipp Karl von Eltz-Kempenich allied the Archbishopric of Mainz with the Habsburgs in this conflict. The majority of fighting in this conflict took place in the Rhineland, leading the archbishop reluctantly to order the fortification of Mainz. He acquired Lordship of Vukovar in 1736, and went on to order the construction of Eltz Manor. The War of the Polish Succession ended by the Treaty of Vienna (1738), but was soon succeeded by the War of the Austrian Succession.

He died on 21 March 1743 and is buried in Mainz Cathedral.

Catholic Church titles
| Preceded by Francis Louis of Palatinate-Neuburg | Archbishop of Mainz; 1732 – 1743 | Succeeded by Johann Friedrich Karl von Ostein |
