= Cerić, Croatia =

Cerić
- Village
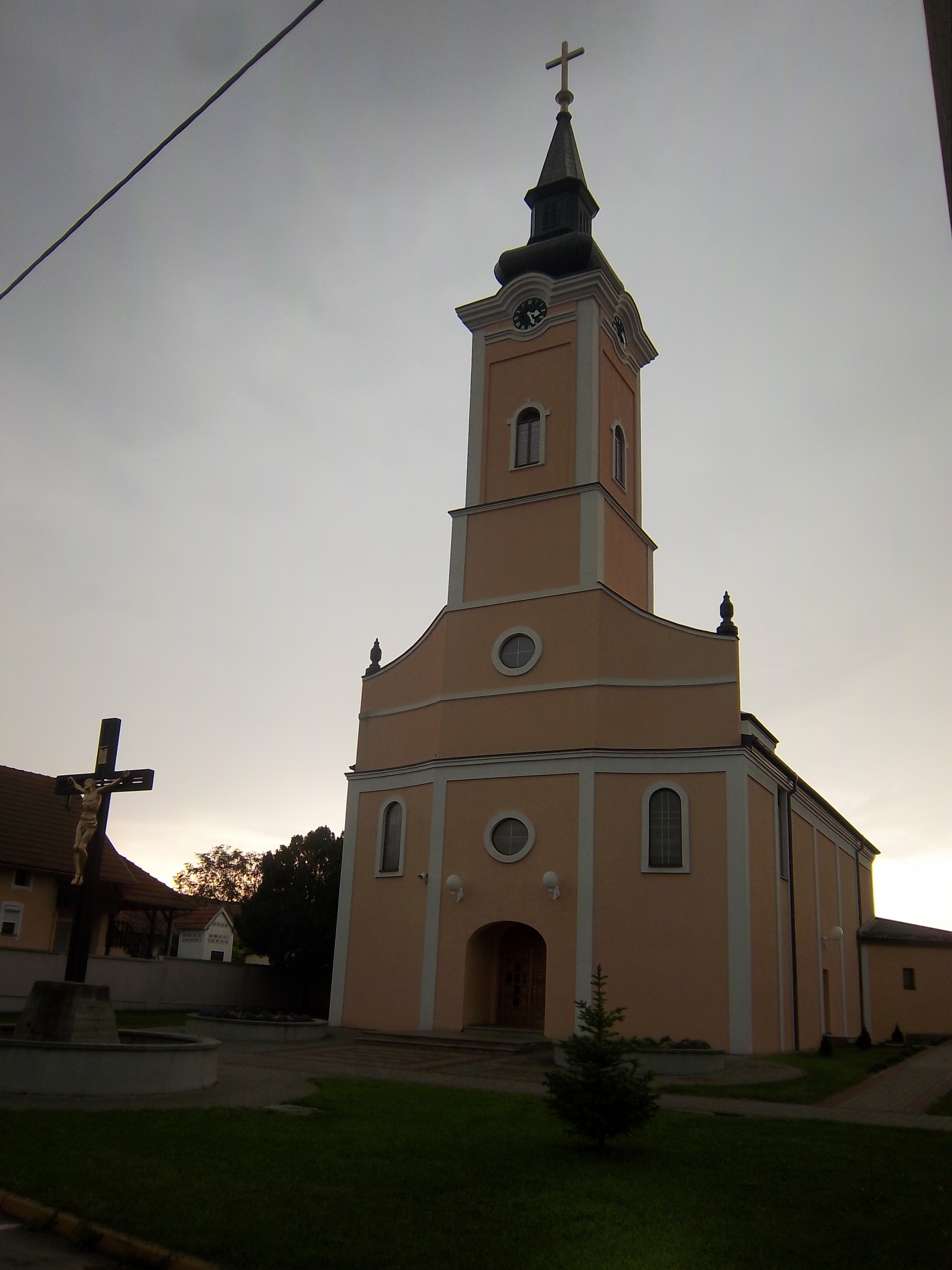

- Location within Vukovar-Syrmia County Location within Croatia Location within Europe
- Coordinates: 45.311151°N 18.856404°E
- Country: Croatia
- County: Vukovar-Syrmia
- Municipality: Nuštar

Area
  - Total: 13.9 km^{2} (5.4 sq mi)

Population (2021)
  - Total: 1,292
  - Density: 92.9/km^{2} (241/sq mi)
- Time zone: UTC+1 (CET)
  - Summer (DST): UTC+2 (CEST)
- Postal code: 32221 Nuštar
- Vehicle registration: VK

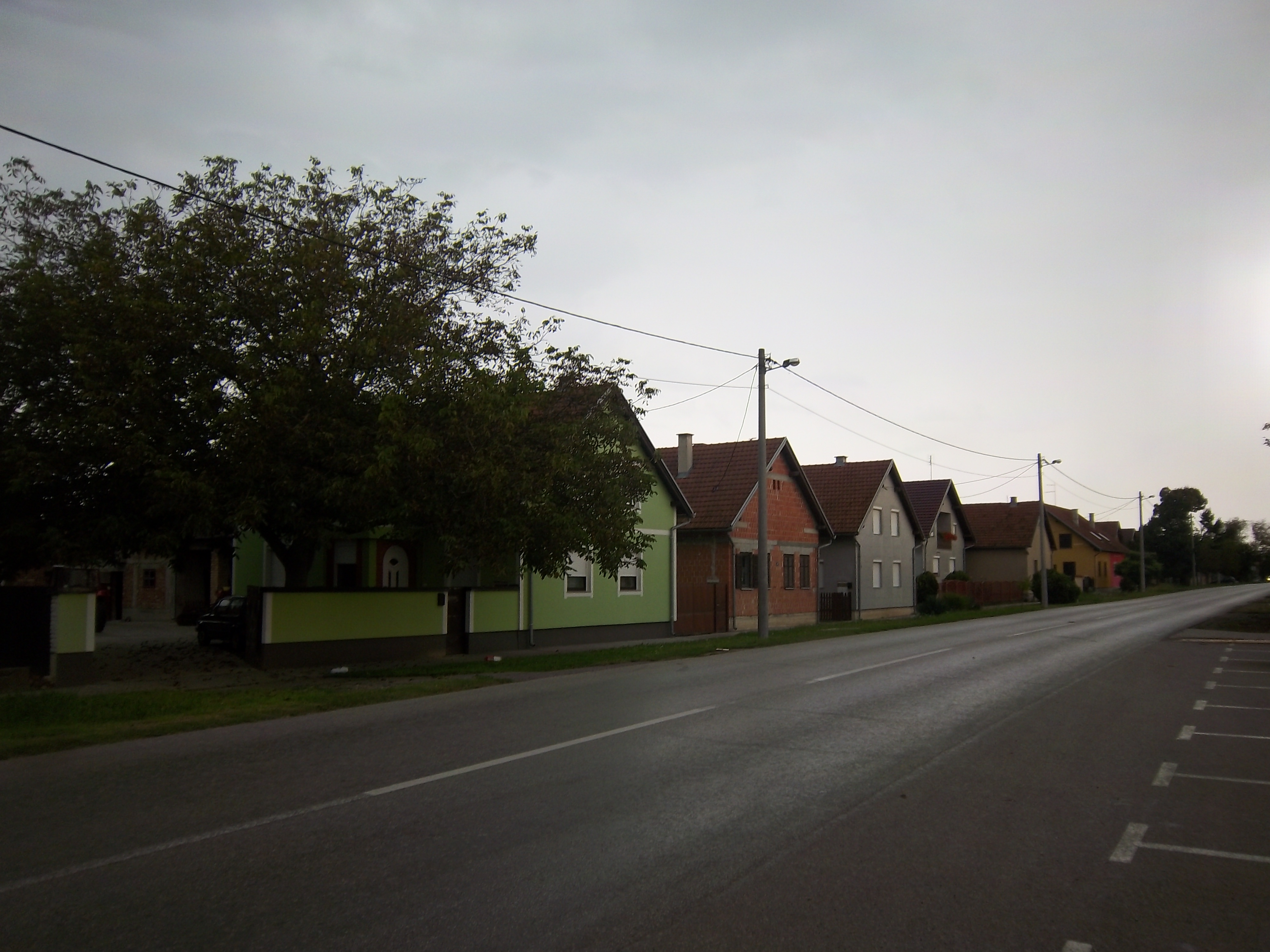
Cerić

Cerić is a village in eastern Croatia, located to the northeast of Vinkovci.

Cerić was first mentioned in historical documents in 1267, as part of the Monoštar estate. Following Ottoman retreat from the region, the Lordship of Nuštar was established, and the village became part of its domain. Today, Cerić is part of the Nuštar municipality.

During the Croatian War of Independence, Cerić was on the eastern front, and it was occupied by Serbian forces on October 2, 1991, to the detriment of the Croatian civilian population.
