= Trpinja =

Trpinja Трпиња (Serbian)
- Municipality
- Municipality of Trpinja; Općina Trpinja; Општина Трпиња
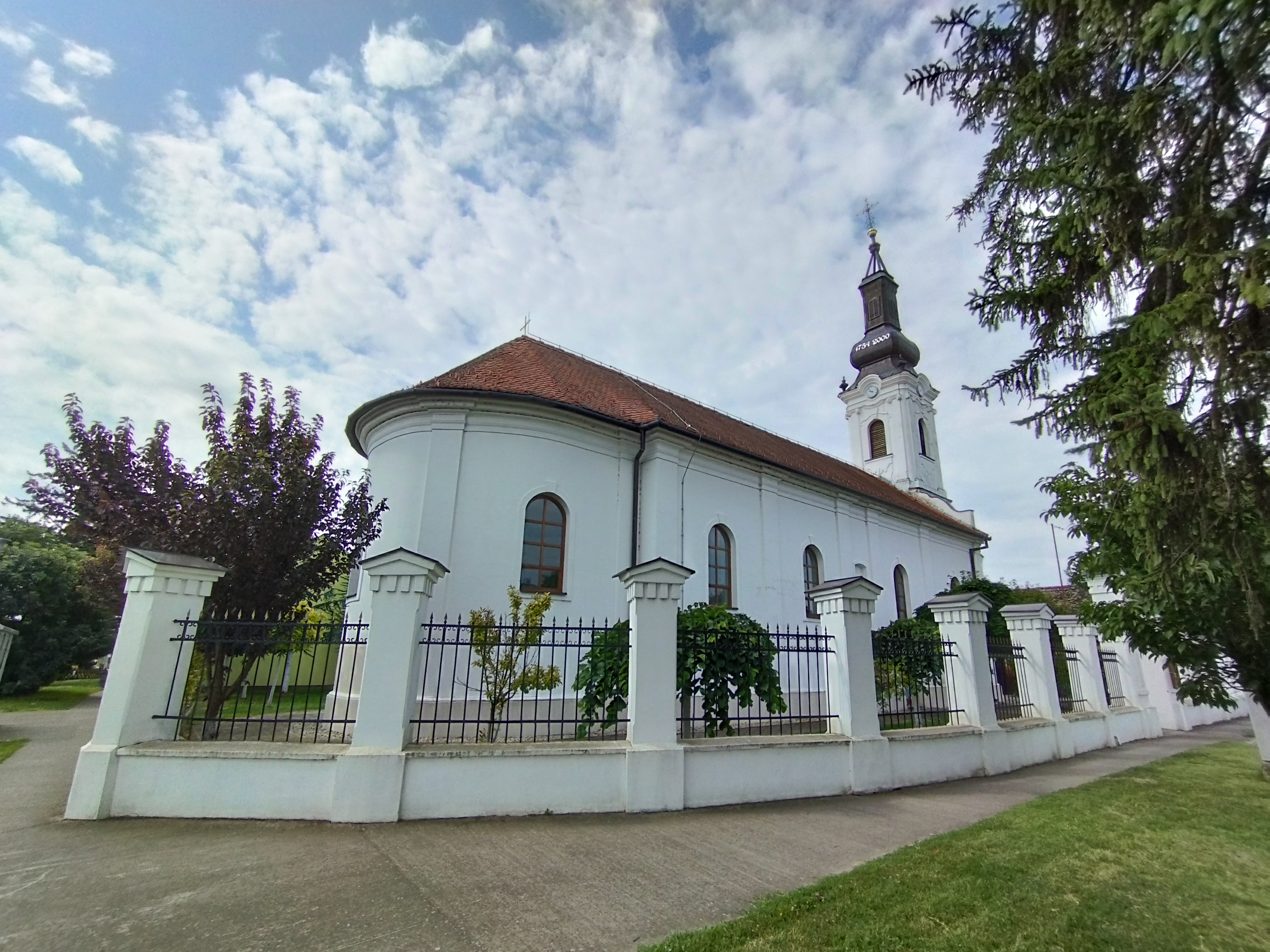
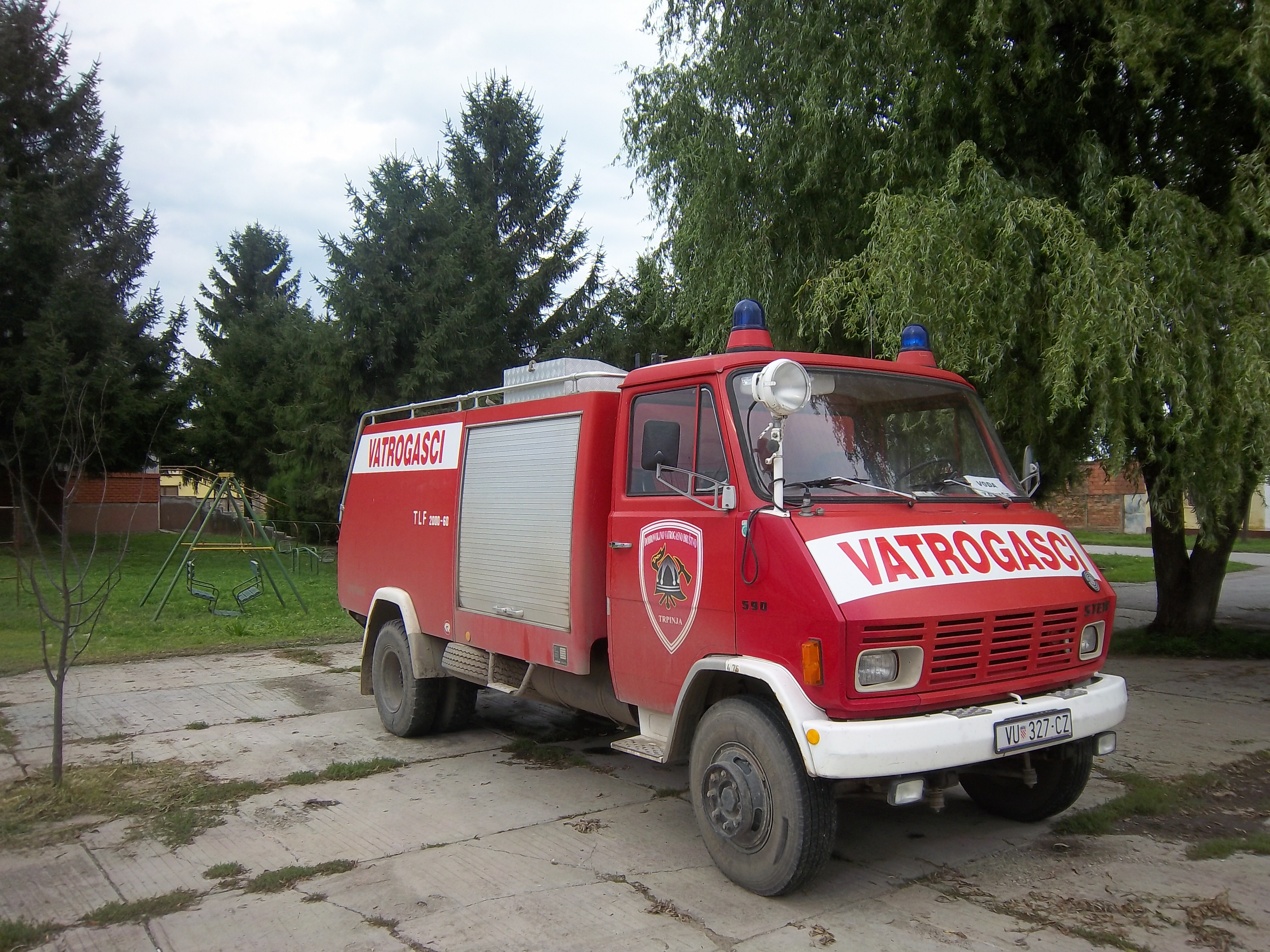
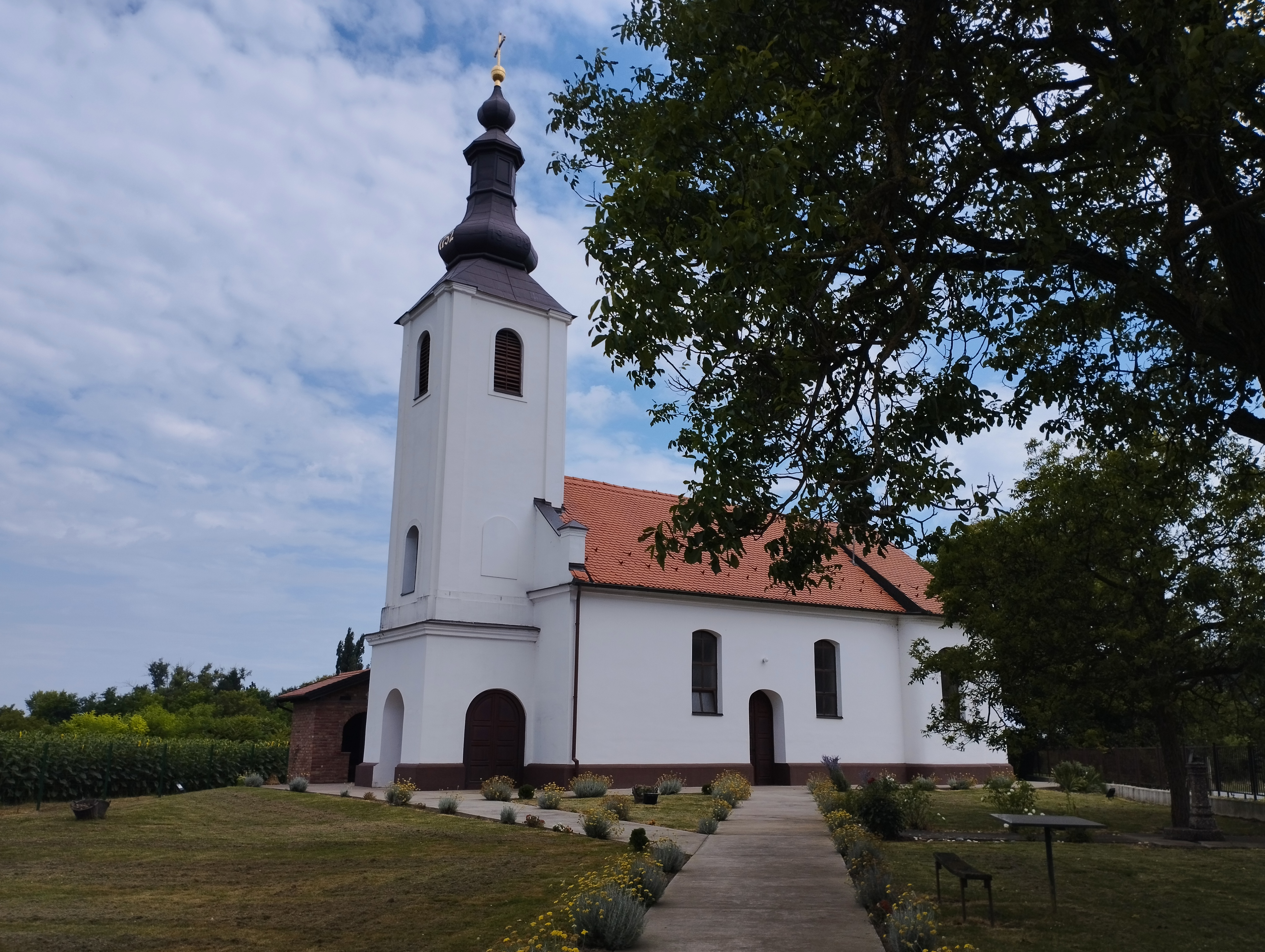
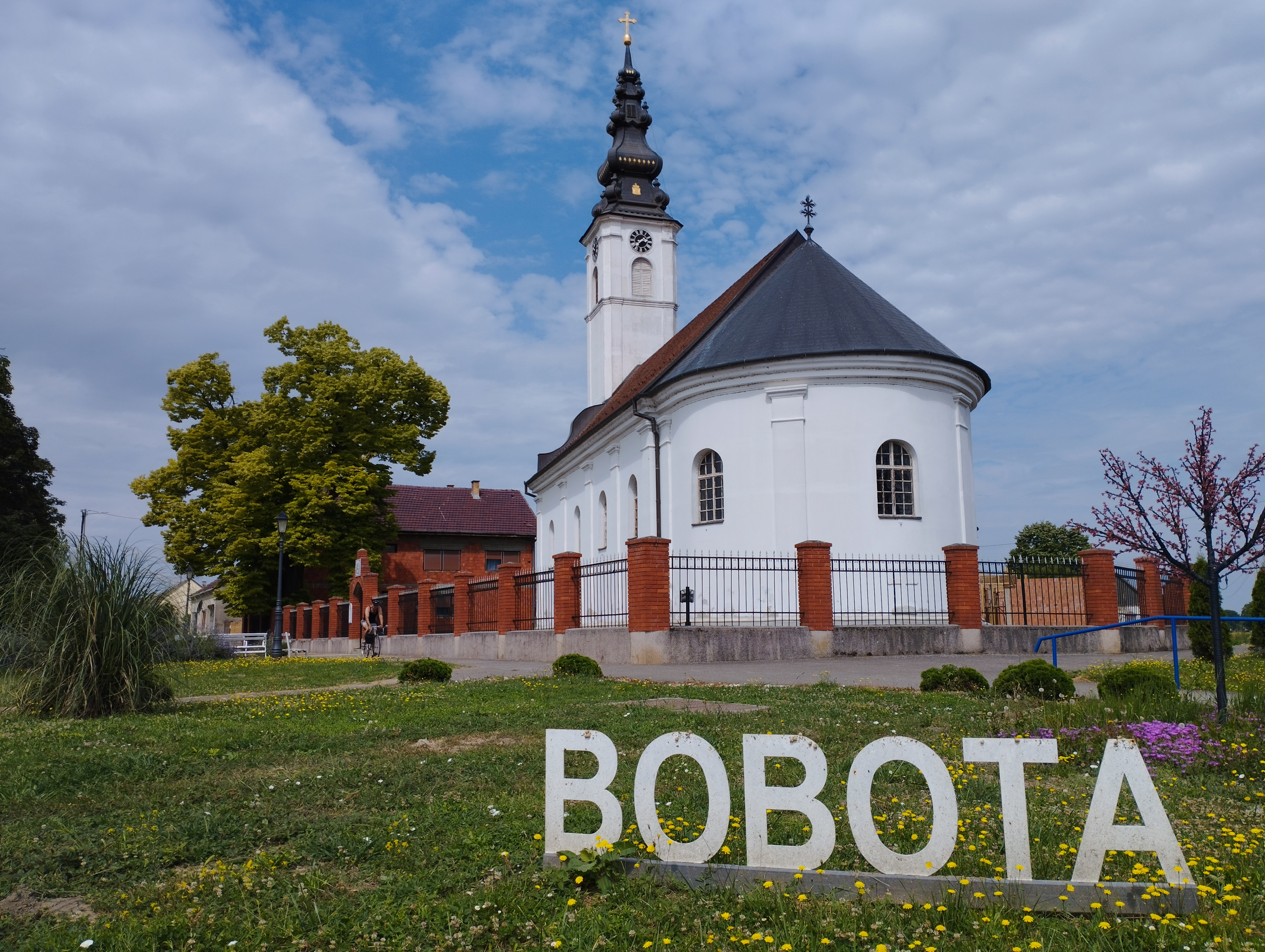
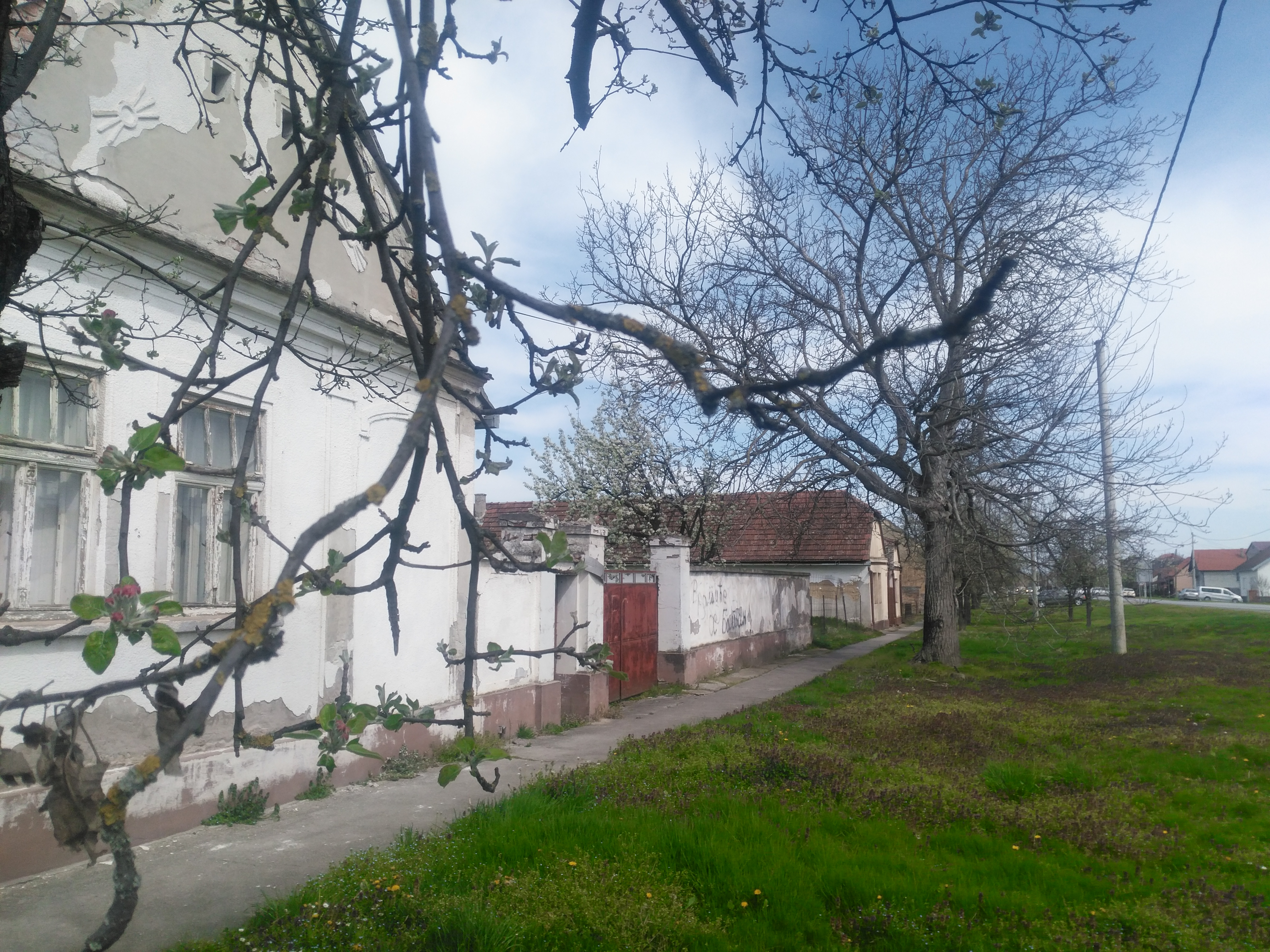
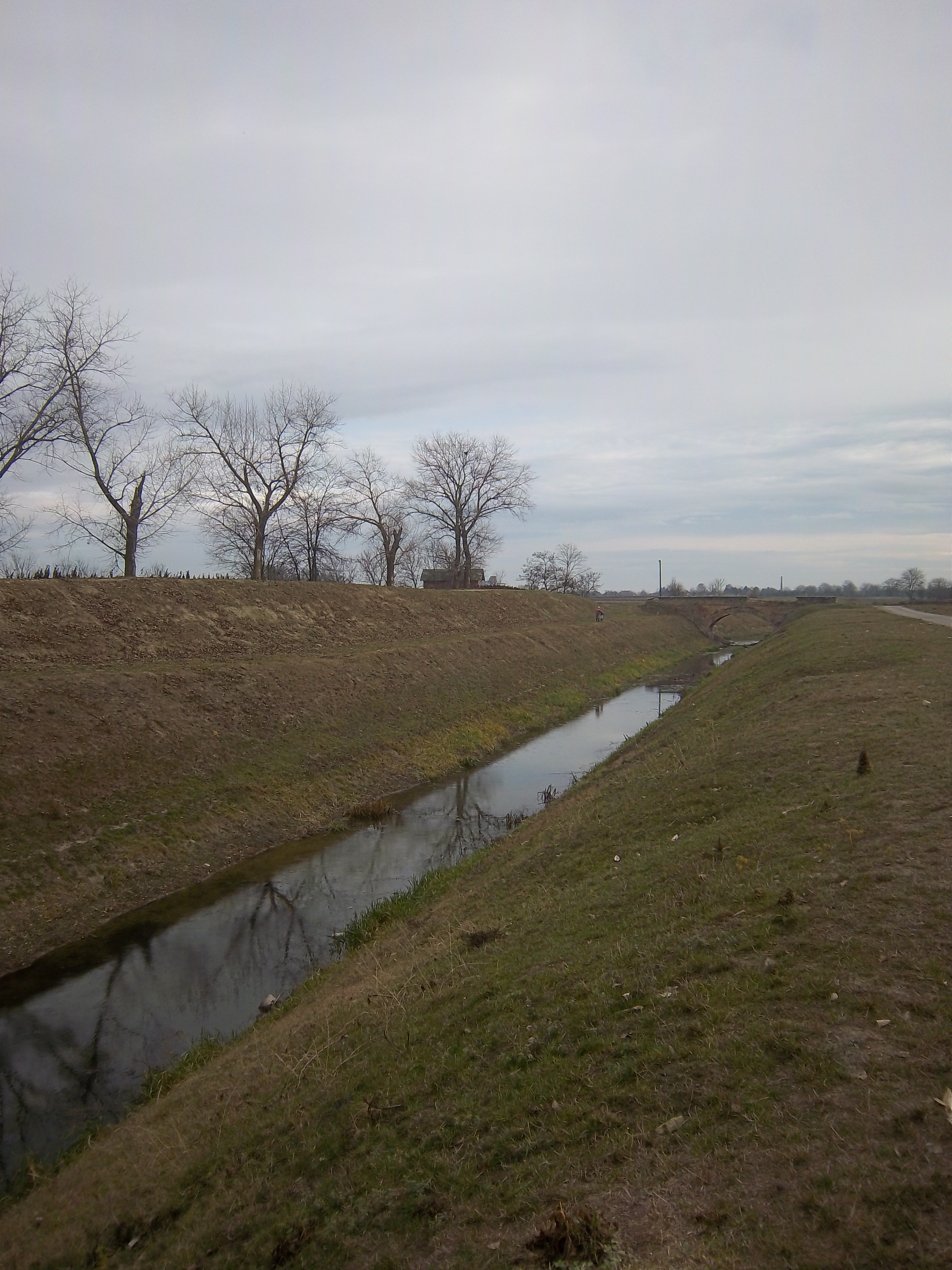
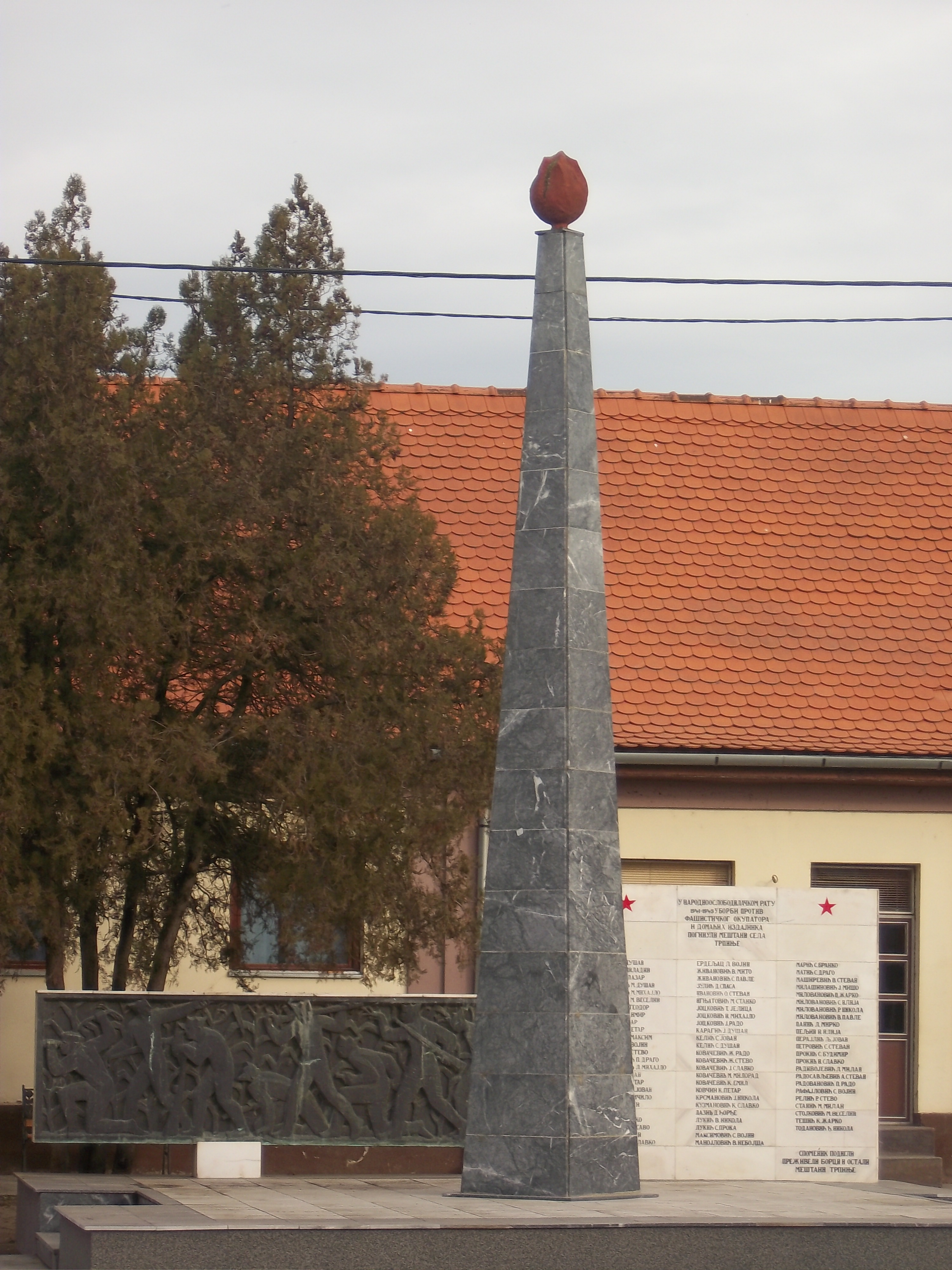
- Serbian Orthodox Church in Trpinja Firefighters in Vera Church of St. Nicholas, Pačetin Church of St. George, Bobota Bršadin Bobota Canal World War II monument in Trpinja

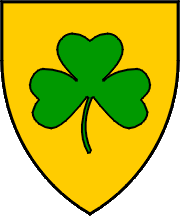
- Flag Coat of arms

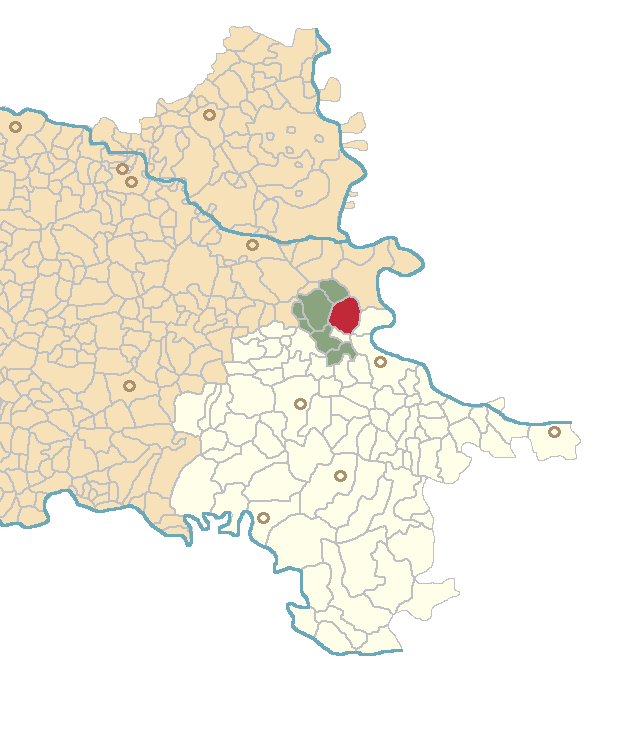

- Location of Trpinja in Croatia Trpinja (Croatia) Trpinja (Europe)
- Coordinates: 45°25′N 18°54′E
- Country: Croatia
- Region: Slavonia (Podunavlje)
- County: Vukovar-Syrmia County
- Municipal seat Largest settlement: Trpinja Bobota

Government
  - Municipal mayor: Miroslav Palić (Independent)

Area
  - Municipality: 122.8 km^{2} (47.4 sq mi)
  - Urban: 30.0 km^{2} (11.6 sq mi)
- Elevation: 86 m (282 ft)

Population (2021)
  - Municipality: 4,167
  - Density: 33.93/km^{2} (87.89/sq mi)
  - Urban: 1,130
  - Urban density: 37.7/km^{2} (97.6/sq mi)
- Demonym(s): Trpinjanin (♂) Trpinjanka (♀) (per grammatical gender)
- Time zone: UTC+1 (CET)
  - Summer (DST): UTC+2 (CEST)
- Postal code: 32224 Trpinja
- Area code: 32
- Vehicle registration: VU
- Official languages: Croatian, Serbian
- Municipality established: April 13, 1997
- Website: opcinatrpinja.hr

Trpinja (Serbian Cyrillic: Трпиња, Hungarian: Terpenye) is a village and an eponymous municipality in the Vukovar-Syrmia County in eastern Croatia. It lies along the D2 state road connecting Osijek and Vukovar, approximately two kilometres northwest of Vukovar. During the Battle of Vukovar of the Croatian War of Independence this route, known locally as Trpinjska cesta (“Trpinja road”), became one of the major battle sites.

The Municipality of Trpinja was established in 1997 under the administration of United Nations Transitional Administration for Eastern Slavonia, Baranja and Western Sirmium (UNTAES). It was created as one of several predominantly Serb municipalities to secure local self-government for the Serb community in the region following the war. Trpinja is the northernmost municipality in Vukovar-Syrmia County and comprises seven villages. According to the 2011 census, the municipality had a population of 5,572, of whom 1,537 resided in the village of Trpinja itself.

The landscape of the municipality is characteristic of the Pannonian Basin, dominated by flat plains and extensive agricultural land cultivated with maize, wheat, sunflower, and sugar beet.

== Name ==
The villages of Trpinja, Bobota and Vera share a common legend about the origin of their names. According to local oral tradition, the forebears of today’s inhabitants settled in the area during the Great Migrations of the Serbs led by Arsenije III Čarnojević. These settlers, known as the Bobe, were said to have fled the advancing Ottoman Empire forces in the Balkans in order to safeguard their religious freedom.

Their legendary devotion to Eastern Orthodoxy was coined in the phrase “Bobe endured for the faith” (Serbian: Bobe trpiše za veru). In this interpretation, the name Bobota derives from the family name Bobe, Trpinja from the verb trpiti (“to endure”); and Vera from the word vera (“faith”).

An alternative account attributes the name Trpinja to a landowner named Trpimir, who is believed to have held estates in the surrounding area.

== Geography ==
The municipality is located on the border between historical regions of Slavonia and Syrmia, in the southern part of Pannonian Basin in the Podunavlje region. The total area of the municipality is 123.87 km^{2} (47.8 sq mi). The river Vuka flows through the municipality in length of 8 kilometers as well as an artificial Bobota Canal in the length of 20 kilometers. The territory of the municipality is completely flat, with very fertile black soil. The municipality shares borders with Borovo, Bogdanovci, Nuštar, Tordinci, Šodolovci and Erdut municipalities, with the town of Vukovar and the city of Osijek.

=== Climate and weather ===
Trpinja experiences a humid continental climate, characterized by hot summers and cold winters. Snowfall occurs regularly in most winters, and temperatures below 0 °C are common between December and February. Spring is marked by variable weather conditions and a rapid rise in average temperatures with mild to warm days relatively cool nights. Summers are generally warm to hot, with occasional sudden heavy showers, particularly in late spring and early summer. Autumn, from mid-September to late October, is typically characterised by relatively low precipitation and extended periods of sunny weather with moderate temperatures, before a sharper cooling sets in during late October or early November. Compared to more western parts of continental Croatia, Trpinja experiences a high number of sunny days and lower levels of precipitation.

=== Transport ===
Trpinja is connected by D2 road with rest of the country. D55 road goes through the village Bršadin. County road Ž4111 goes through the villages of Pačetin, Bobota and Vera.

Railway line M601 that connects Vinkovci, Borovo Naselje and Vukovar goes through the Trpinja municipality.

=== Settlements ===
The Municipality of Trpinja is divided into seven settlements.

Map	Settlement	2021 Population
	Bobota	1,202
	Bršadin	931
	Ćelije	98
	Ludvinci	79
	Pačetin	381
	Trpinja	1,130
	Vera	346

== History ==
=== Prehistoric and Early Settlements ===
Archaeological evidence of prehistoric habitation in the wider municipality has been identified at the site of “Pašnjak pod selom” near Bršadin settlement. The site, located on an elevated tell in the floodplain of the Vuka River, has been dated to c. 4900–4000 BCE and is associated with the late Sopot culture, with additional finds linked to the Cucuteni–Trypillia and Tisza cultural complexes. It is registered as a protected cultural good of the Republic of Croatia.

=== Roman Period ===
Archaeological evidence from the wider Trpinja municipality indicates activity in the Roman period. At the site of Staro Ljeskovo near Bobota, remains dated to the 4th century CE include bricks bearing the inscription “I H”, associated with the Legio VI Herculia. Additional finds from the site include Roman ceramics, glass, oil lamps, and a stone altar dedicated by the tribune Titus Flavius Marcianus.

=== Medieval and Ottoman Period ===
The settlement of Trpinja was first mentioned in 1329 in a document issued in the medieval Kingdom of Hungary, today preserved in Budapest. In this period, the area of present-day Trpinja comprised several smaller settlements, including Mala Trpinja, Velika Trpinja and Slavenska Trpinja (Slavic Trpinja). These villages were owned by local gentry until the Ottoman conquest of the region in 1536. Following the establishment of Ottoman rule, the area was repopulated with Serb settlers, which contributed to a demographic shift and a decline in the proportion of the earlier Hungarian population.

=== Habsburg Period ===
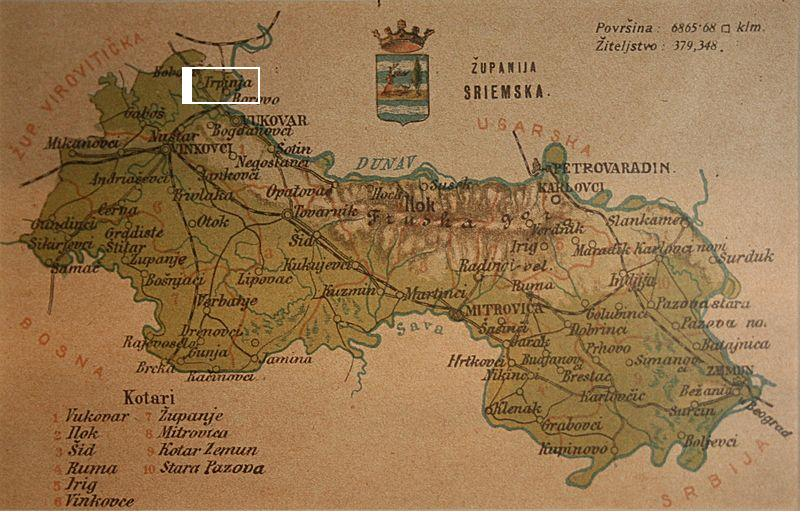
Trpinja on map of Syrmia County from 1900

Area was under Ottoman administration until 1691, when it was conquered by the Habsburg Monarchy. Following Ottoman retreat from the region, the Lordship of Vukovar was established, and the village became part of its domain in 1725. According to the census of 1732, Trpinja had 109 Serb families. Construction of the Serbian Orthodox church began in 1750 and was completed in 1755. The first school in Trpinja was opened in 1776, while in 1859 Trpinja had a factory for spinning silk. In 1882, population of Trpinja numbered about 1,800 people in 400 homes. The inhabitants were Christian Orthodox Serbs, except 2-3 families who were of Roman Catholic faith.

=== Yugoslav Period ===
Although the period of First World War in the village was marked by disease and poverty, Trpinja residents hosted the population of the village of Jakovo. From 27 December 1920 (when they arrived in Vukovar) soldiers and families of the White Russian émigrés who were followers of Pyotr Wrangel settled in Bobota, Pačetin, Bršadin, Trpinja and Vera. The villagers participated in the anti-fascist struggle during World War II, and one number of them ended up in concentration camps of Independent State of Croatia. During the war, 452 soldiers from Trpinja fought in the 9th Slavonian Brigade, of which 75 were killed. 170 Romani people from Trpinja were arrested by Ustaše and taken to Jasenovac concentration camp in 1942, no one of them returned. According to the 1981 census, Trpinja had 2,243 inhabitants.

=== Croatian War of Independence ===
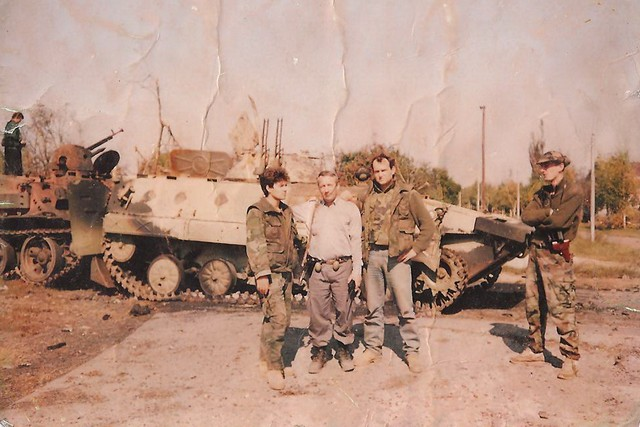
Blago Zadro (middle) on the Trpinja road during the Battle of Vukovar

Between 1991 and 1997, Trpinja was controlled by the Serbs who rebelled against the democratically elected Croatian Government. During that time, the non-Serb population was subjected to unlawful arrests, imprisonment, physical, mental and sexual abuse and killings by the members of local Serb paramilitary formations. Civilians were physically and mentally abused on a daily basis, forced to sing Chetnik songs, threatened with mutilation by cutting off limbs and body parts, men were forced to kneel in the village center and graze the grass, women were threatened with rape, with one being raped and another forced to drink blood that was leaking from the broken nose of an abused man. Ten captives from Trpinja, as well as civilians captured in Borovo and severely wounded civilians from the Borovo Commerce hospital, who had previously been brutally beaten, had been executed in the nearby Bobotski kanal. In 2016, 10 Serbs were convicted for war crimes against prisoners of war and civilians to prison sentences ranging between 5 and 20 years. During the Battle of Vukovar, Yugoslav People's Army (JNA) and various paramilitary forces from Serbia tried to break through the Vukovar defense from the direction of Trpinja, namely through Trpinjska cesta, the road that connected Trpinja and Vukovar. However, the Croatian soldiers of the Croatian National Guard (ZNG) and civilian volunteers, led by Major general Blago Zadro, offered strong resistance, during which they destroyed about 30 JNA tanks and armored vehicles which gave road the nickname "tank graveyard". Trpinja was reintegrated into Croatia with the Erdut Agreement.

== Demographics ==
=== Population ===
There are 1,537 inhabitants in village Trpinja and 5,572 inhabitants in the municipality according to the 2011 census. The majority of the population are Serbs, making up 89.75% of the population according to the 2011 population census. With pronounced issue of population decline in eastern Croatia caused by population ageing, effects of the Croatian War of Independence and emigration after the accession of Croatia to the European Union, the population of the municipality dropped to 4,167 residents at the time of 2021 census.

=== Languages ===
==== Serbian language ====
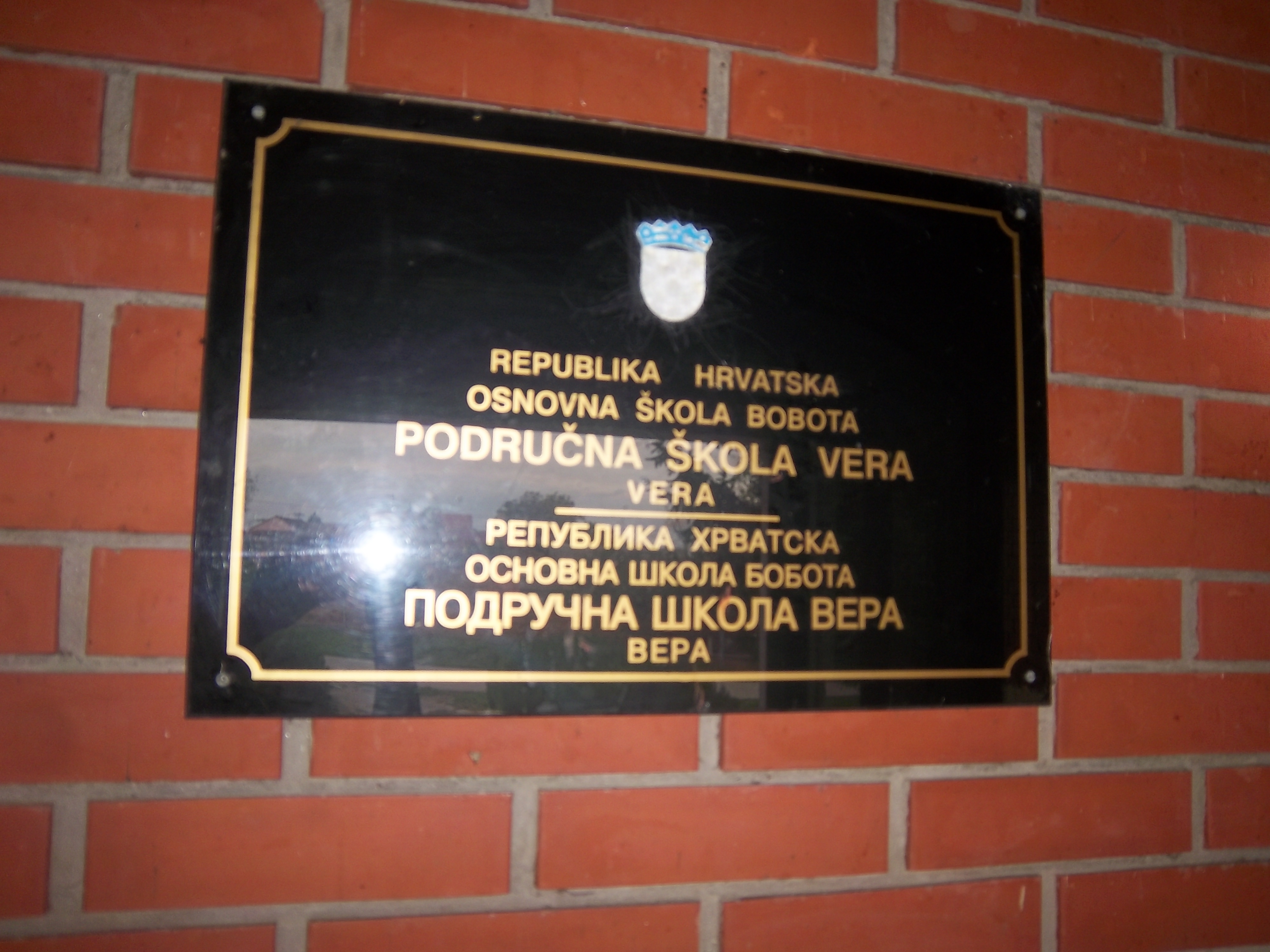
Bilingual sign of an elementary school in the village of Vera

Serbian Language and Serbian Cyrillic alphabet is the second official language in the municipality of Trpinja alongside the Croatian language which is official at the national level in all settlement except predominantly Croat Ćelije. The statute guarantees that Serbian Cyrillic alphabet will be used in text of seals and stamps, on plates of representative, executive and administrative bodies of the municipality, as well as on those of legal entities with public authority. Pre-school education for the Serb community is organized and conducted in Serbian and Cyrillic according to the local statute. Elementary education is provided in Serbian as well. As of 2023, most of the legal requirements for the fulfillment of bilingual standards have not been carried out. Official buildings do have Cyrillic signage, as do street signs and seals, but not traffic signs. Cyrillic is not used on any official documents, but there are public legal and administrative employees proficient in the script. Preserving traditional Serbian place names and assigning street names to Serbian historical figures is legally mandated and carried out.

==== Other languages ====
While only Croatian and Serbian enjoy official status, other languages were historically present and important in the region with some of them remaining in limited use up to the present day including Hungarian, Romani, Pannonian Rusyn and Ukrainian. Church Slavonic language is occasionally used as a liturgical language in the local Eastern Orthodox churches and Latin in Roman Catholic church in Ćelije. English and German as foreign languages are part of curriculum at local elementary schools.

=== Religion ===
Church of the Transfiguration of the Lord is a Serbian Orthodox church in village of Trpinja listed in Register of Cultural Goods of Croatia. On the territory of the municipality there are also Serbian Orthodox Church of St. George in Bobota as well as churches in Vera, Pačetin and Bršadin. There is also Roman Catholic church in village of Ćelije.

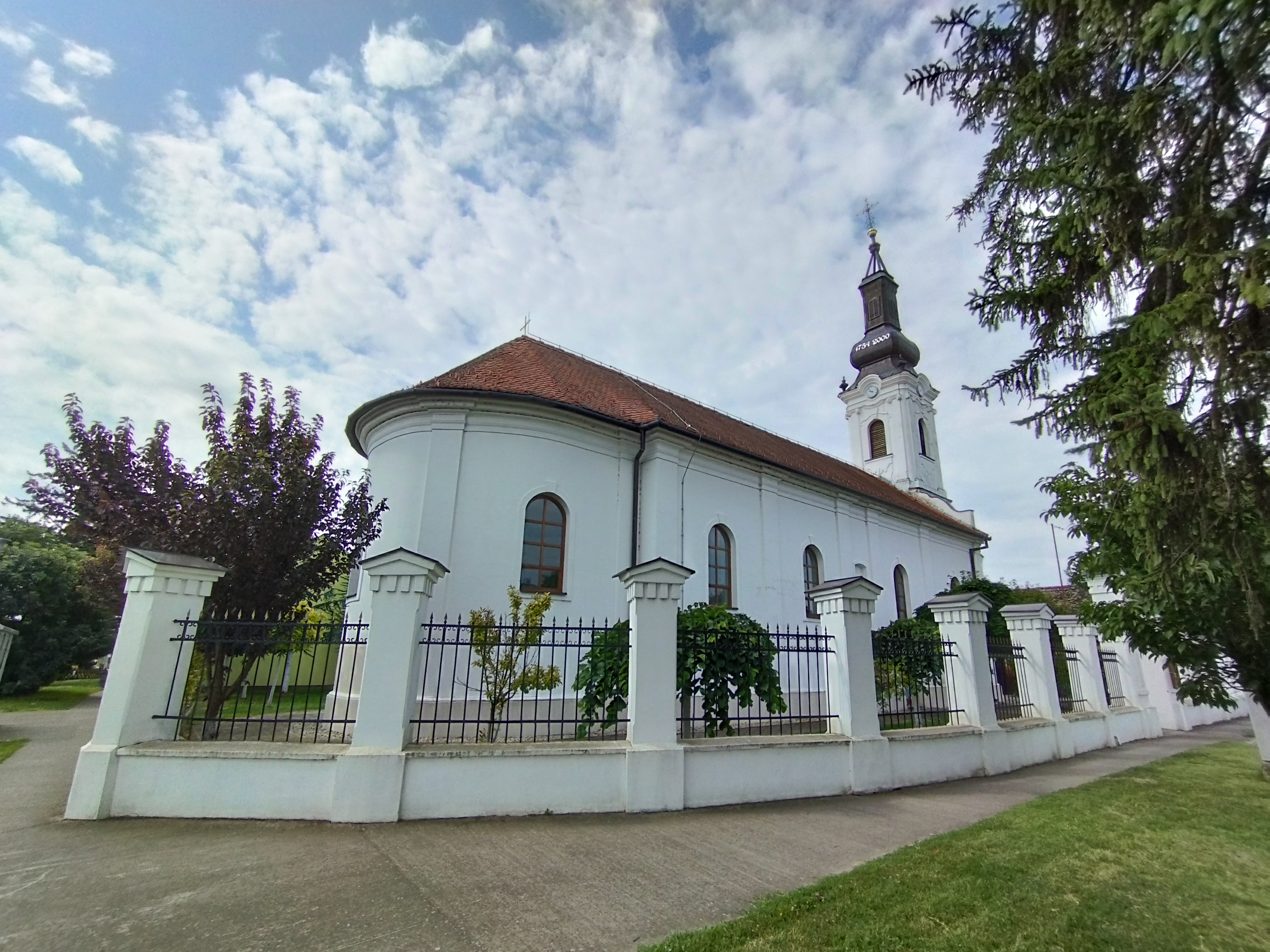
Church of the Transfiguration of the Lord, Trpinja
(Serbian Orthodox)

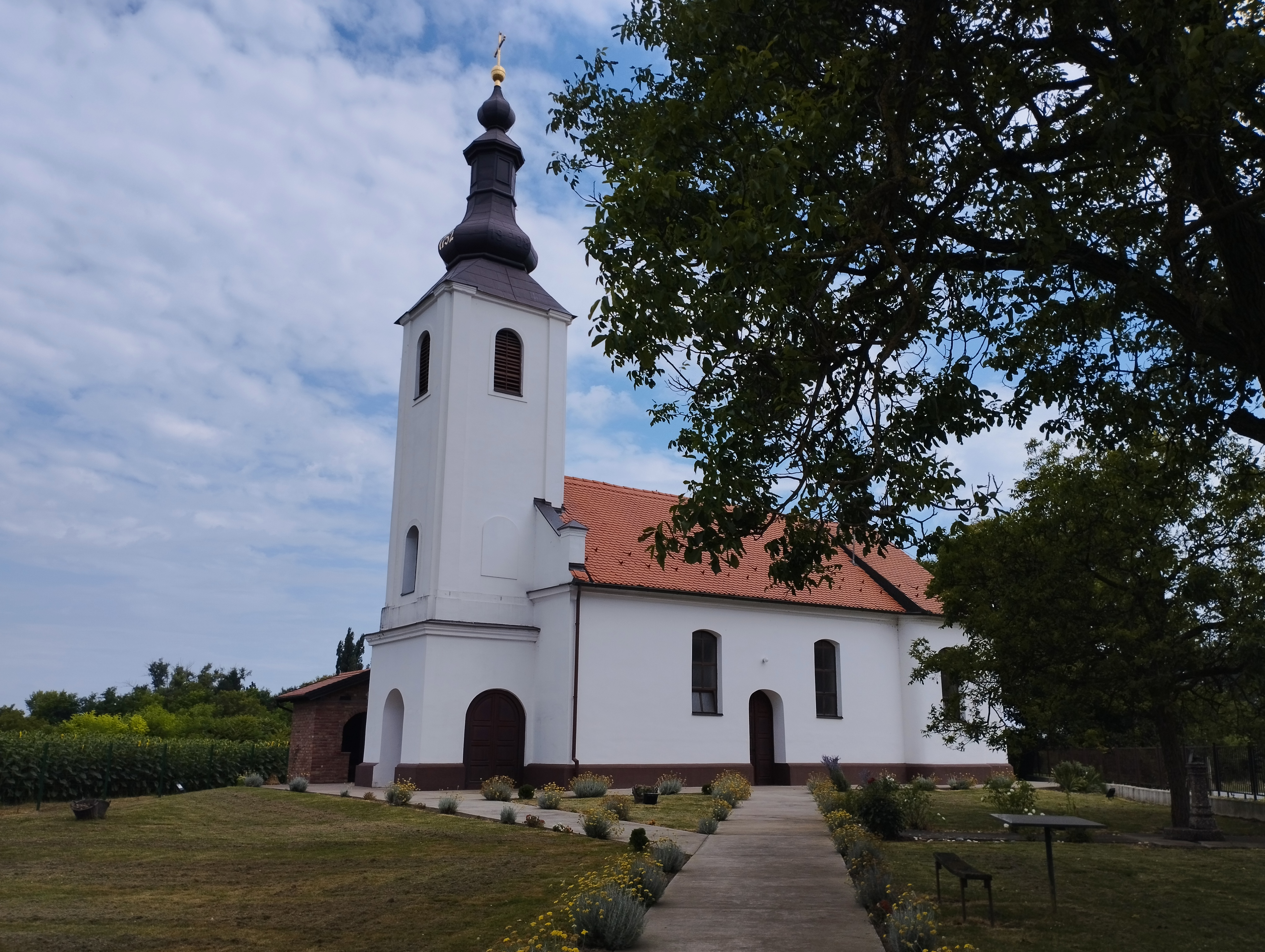
Church of St. Nicholas, Pačetin
(Serbian Orthodox)

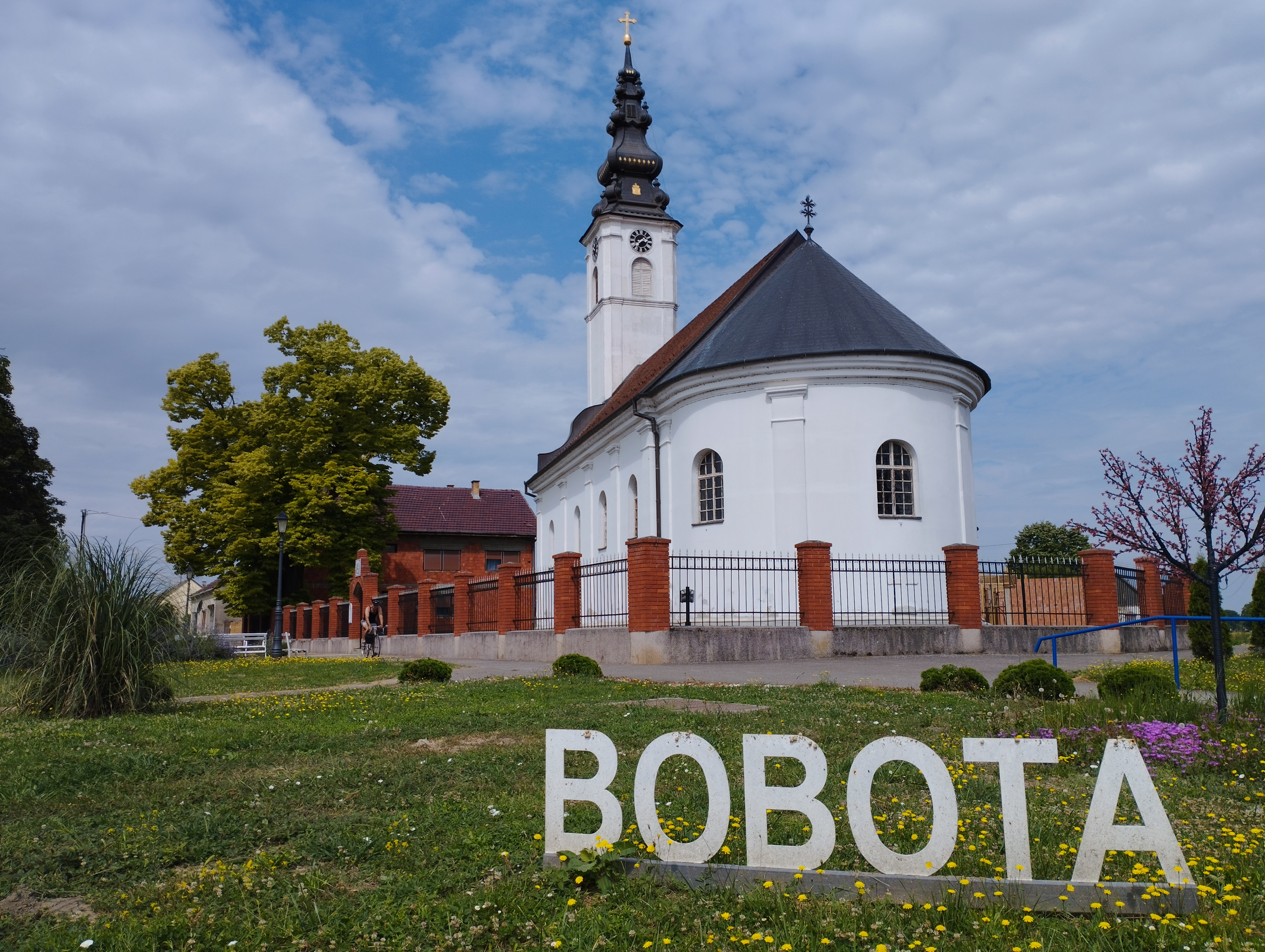
Church of St. George, Bobota
(Serbian Orthodox)

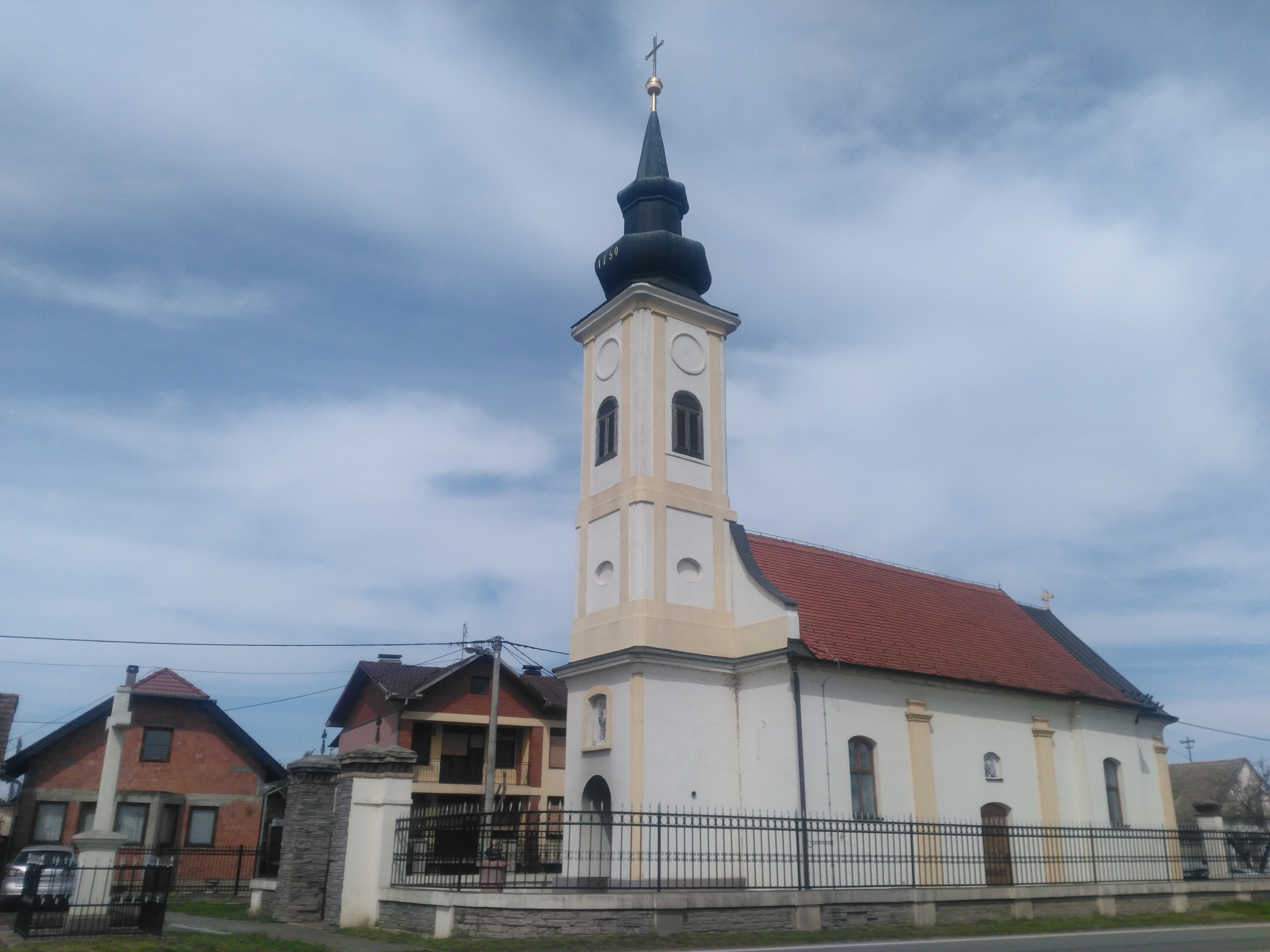
Church of St. Archangel Gabriel, Bršadin
(Serbian Orthodox)

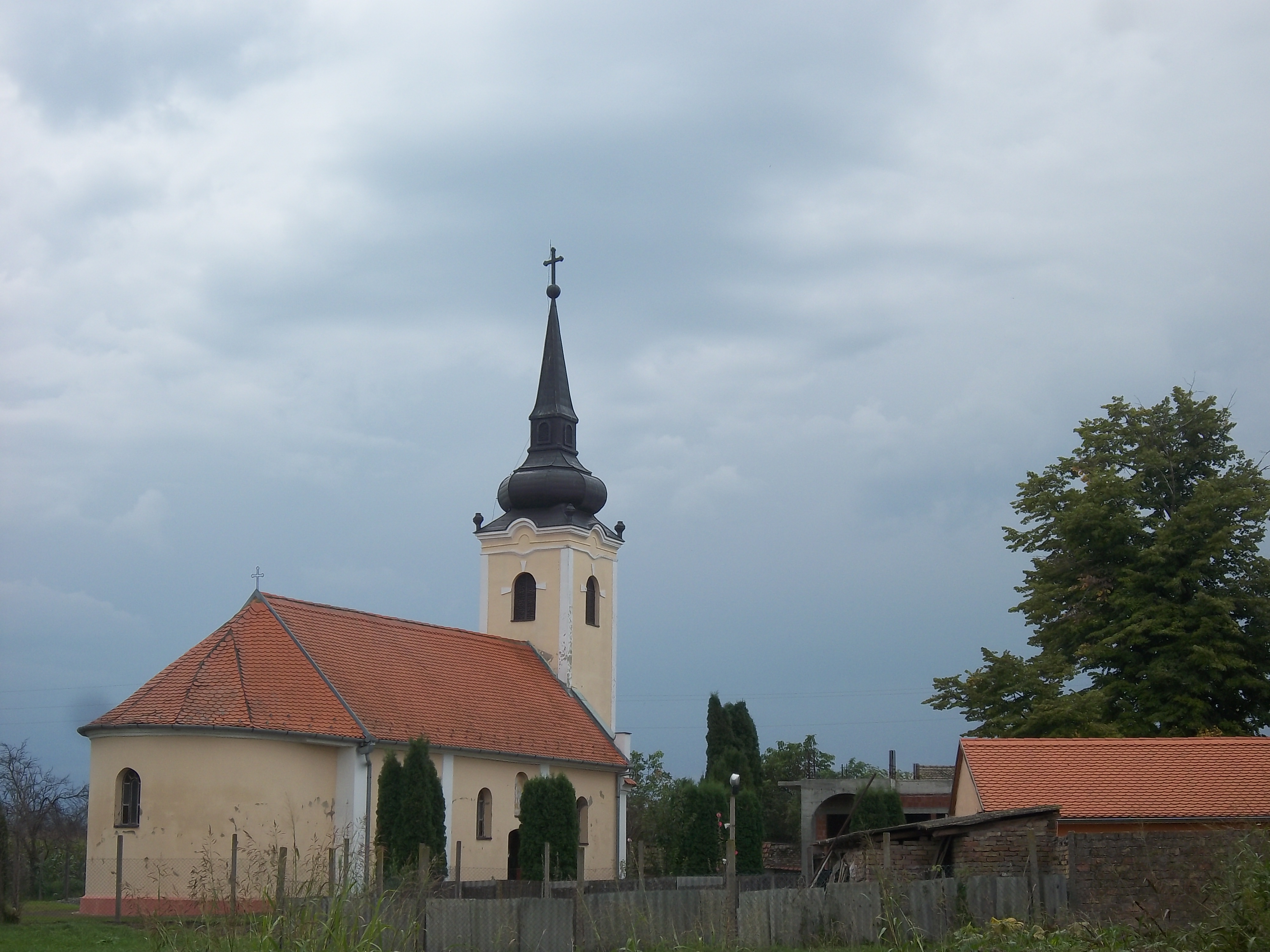
Church of the Annunciation of the Most Holy Theotokos, Vera
(Serbian Orthodox)

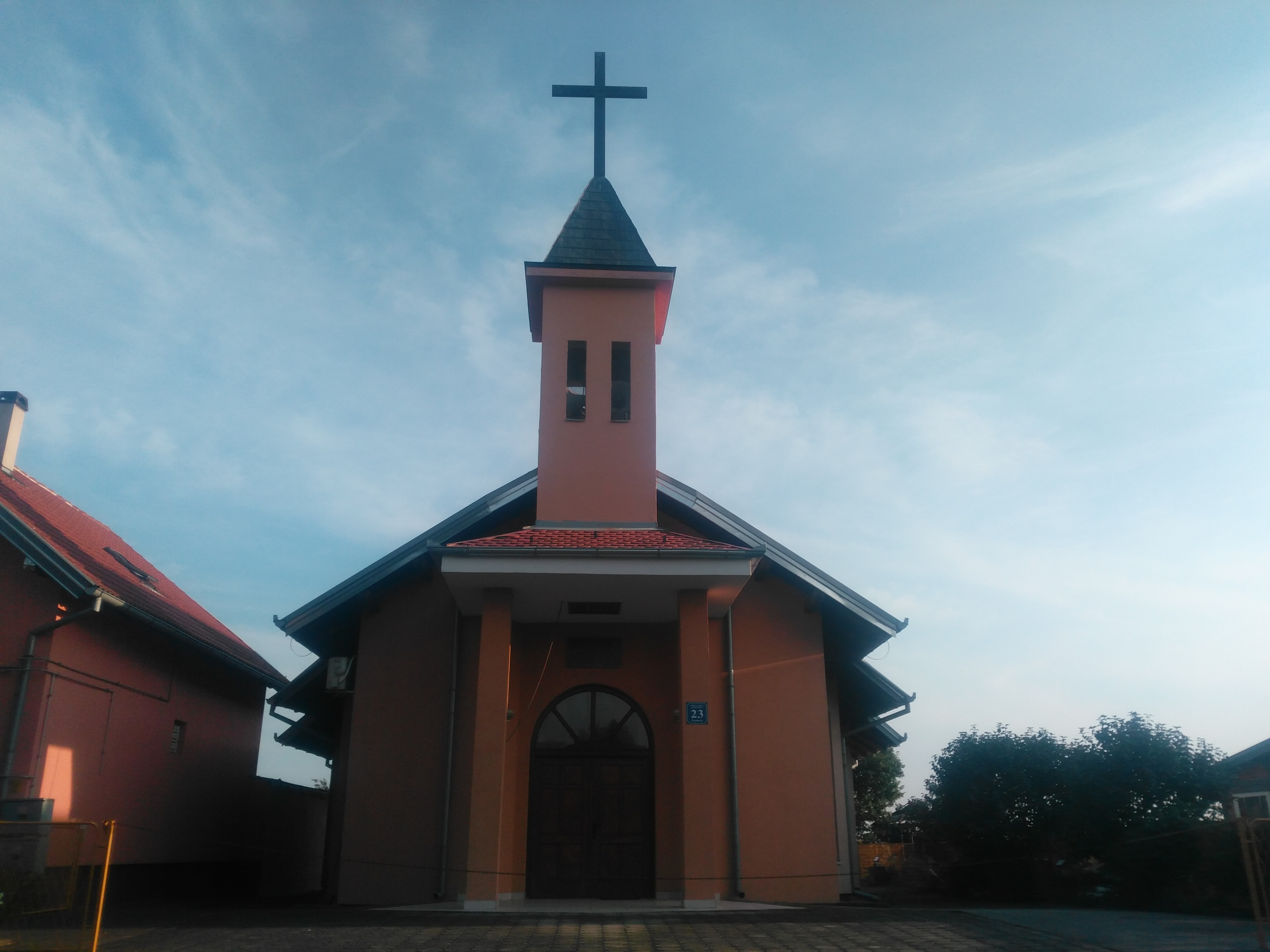
Church of the Sacred Heart of Jesus, Ćelije
(Roman Catholic)

== Politics ==
=== Joint Council of Municipalities ===
The Municipality of Trpinja is one of seven Serb majority member municipalities within the Joint Council of Municipalities, inter-municipal sui generis organization of ethnic Serb community in eastern Croatia established on the basis of Erdut Agreement. As Serb community constitute majority of the population of the municipality it is represented by 2 delegated Councillors at the Assembly of the Joint Council of Municipalities, double the number of Councilors to the number from Serb minority municipalities in Eastern Croatia.

=== Municipal Assembly ===
The Municipal Assembly of Borovo is composed of 14 elected representatives. Out of a total of 3,673 eligible voters at the 2025 Croatian local elections, 1,966 (53.53%) participated in the elections and 1,965 (53.50%) submitted their ballots. There were 1,789 (91.04%) valid and 176 (8.96%) invalid ballots. The Independent Democratic Serb Party got 1,029 (57.51%) ballots and 8 elected representatives, the Independent politician Vuk Popović list got 760 ballots (42.48%) and five elected representatives. In counties, cities, towns, and municipalities where the regular elections resulted in the underrepresentation of national minorities or ethnic Croats (where they constitute a minority as it is case in Trpinja), additional elections were held on 5 October 2025. Croat electorate elected one additional representative from Independent politician Anđelko Popek list.

Summary of the 2025 Croatian local elections
Party	Votes	%	Seats
Independent Democratic Serb Party	1,029	57.51%	8
Independent politician Vuk Popović	760	42.48%	5
Independent Politician Anđelko Popek	/	/	+1 (additional elections)
Invalid/blank votes	176	8.96%	—
Total	1,965	100	—
Registered voters/turnout	3,673	53.50%	—
Source: (in Croatian)

=== Municipal Mayor ===
Three independent candidates competed for a position of municipal mayor of Trpinja at 2025 Croatian local elections. Miroslav Palić won the elections with 1,067 votes while Vuk Popović got 604 and Đorđe Ćurčić got 2020 votes. Turnout at the election was 53.55%.

=== Minority Councils ===
Directly elected national minority councils and representatives serve as advisory bodies to local and regional authorities in Croatia. At the national level, local and regional councils often form coordination bodies. Councils and representatives are elected in units of local or regional self-government where national minorities meet the legally prescribed conditions and where candidates or electoral lists are submitted. They act on behalf of specific national minority communities (for example, Serb or Hungarian national minority councils), contributing to the protection and promotion of minority rights, encouraging participation in public life, and taking part in local decision-making processes, particularly in areas such as culture, education, language use, and media.

At the 2023 elections for national minority councils and representatives in Croatia, the Serb national minority met the legal requirements to elect a ten-member minority council in Trpinja Municipality.

== Economy ==
Trpinja is an underdeveloped municipality which is statistically classified as the First Category Area of Special State Concern by the Government of Croatia. The most common economic activities are tillage and animal husbandry.

== Culture ==
=== Municipal Symbols ===
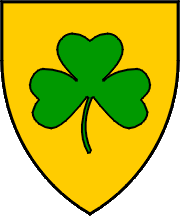
Coat of arms of Trpinja Municipality

Municipal coats of arms and flags in Croatia are regulated by the Law on Local and Regional Self-Government. According to Article 10 of the law, local self-government units may adopt their own coat of arms and flag, which must be defined in the municipality’s statute or a statutory decision and approved in advance by the competent central state authority responsible for local and regional self-government. The coat of arms must follow heraldic rules and consist exclusively of a shield and the elements contained within it. Approved municipal symbols are recorded and one official copy is kept in the Croatian State Archives.

The flag of Trpinja Municipality is monochrome blue with the municipal coat of arms placed in the center of the flag. The coat of arms of Trpinja Municipality consists of a golden (yellow) shield bearing a green three-leaf clover in its center.

=== Points of Interest ===
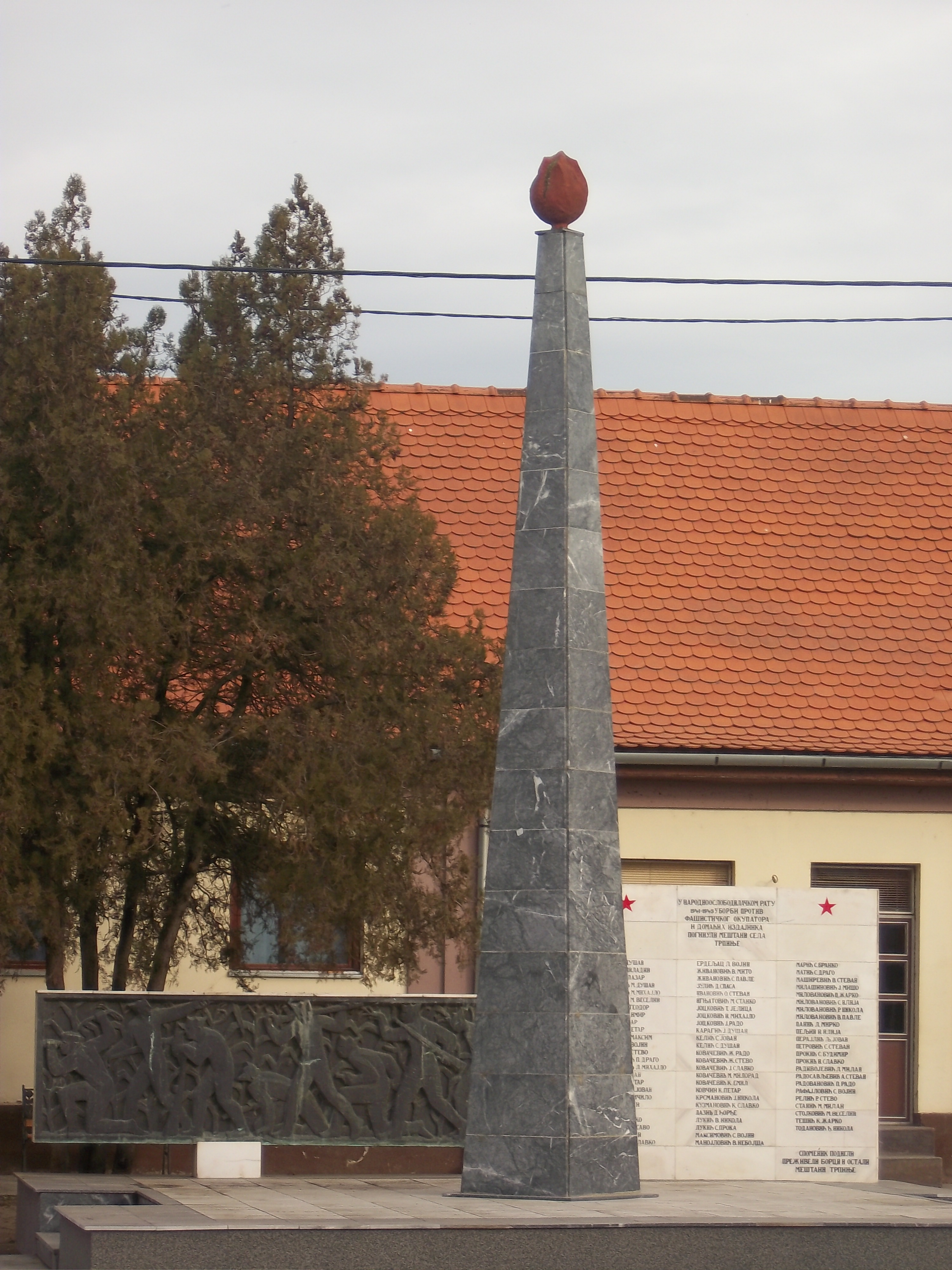
Monument dedicated to fallen soldiers from World War II

Church of the Transfiguration of the Lord in Trpinja was built from 1753 until 1757. The church is a cultural monument and is on the list of immovable cultural heritage of Republic of Croatia. Valuable objects in the church are also on the list of movable cultural heritage of Republic of Croatia. Object is in regular use and is also open for visitors at certain time. Tourist visitors pay no entrance.

At the central site in Trpinja there is a monument dedicated to fallen soldiers from World War II and the fallen soldiers and victims of war in 1991.

Local cultural society "Mladost" was founded in 1995. Its work preserves and promotes the folk customs and culture of Serbs of the Croatian Danube region.

== Society ==
=== Education ===
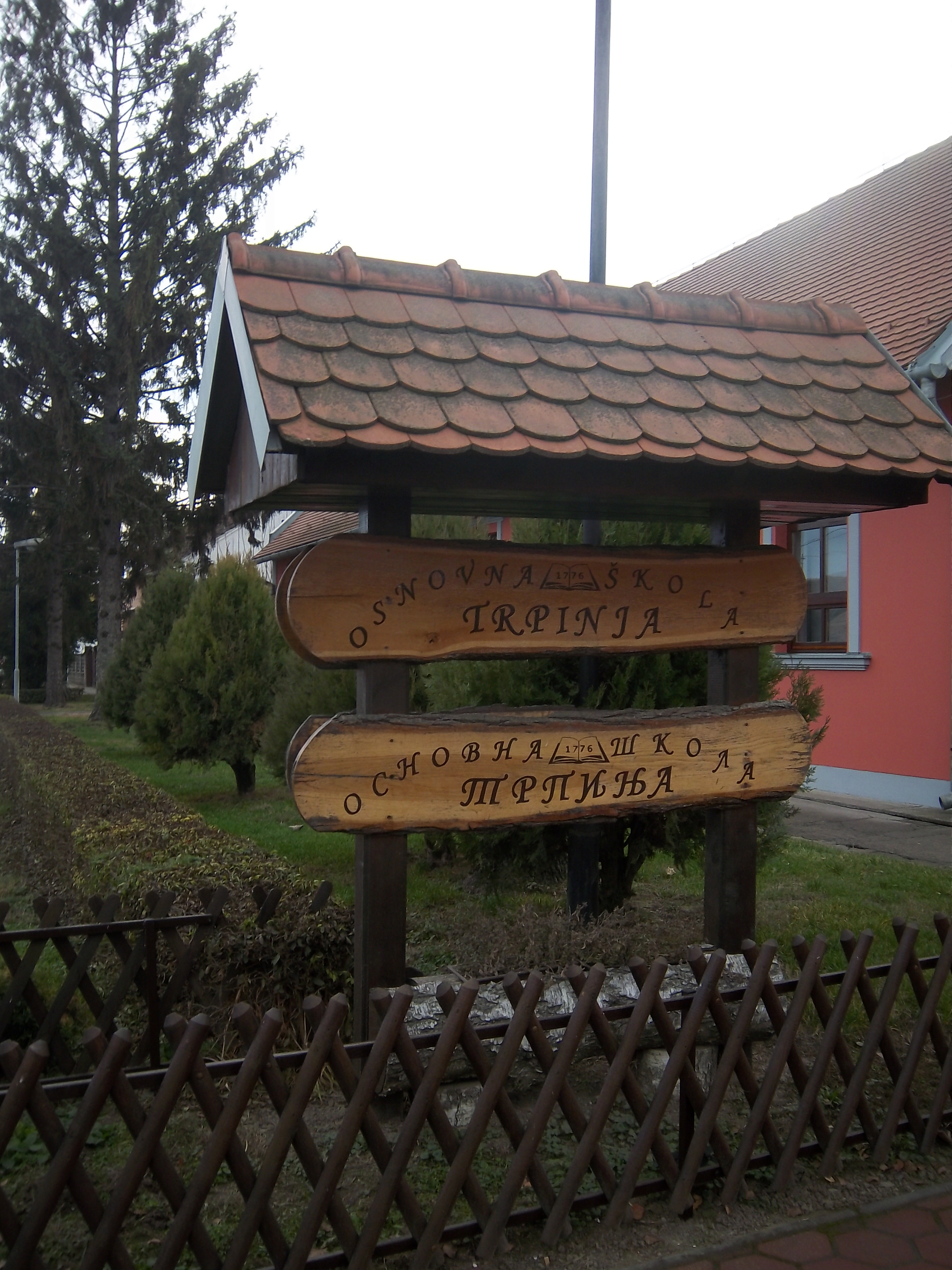
Elementary School in Trpinja

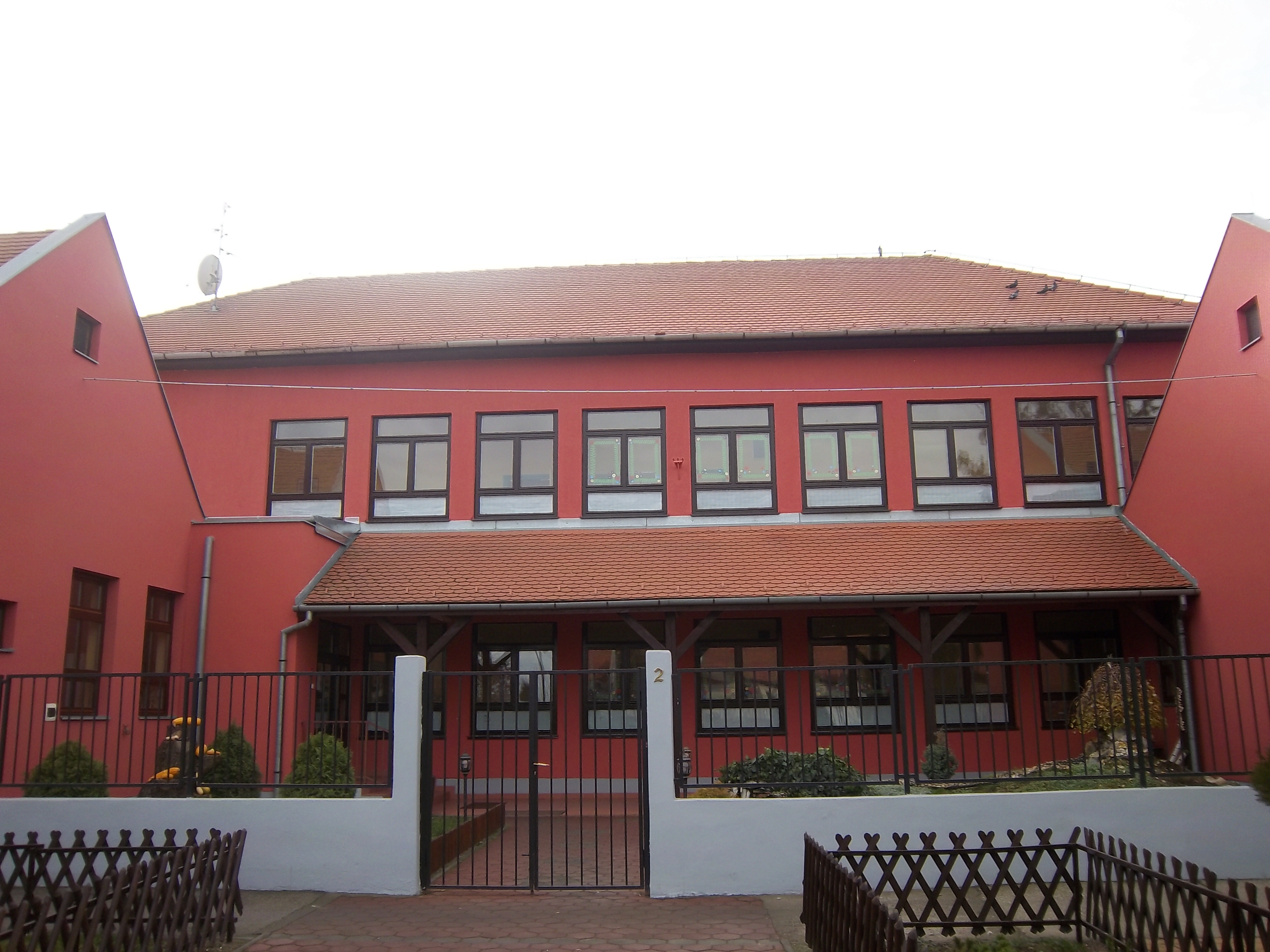
Elementary School in Trpinja

Elementary School in Trpinja is one of the oldest schools in the region, established in 1776. Classes at the school take place exclusively in the Serbian (exceptions are Croatian and foreign languages). Upon completion of eight years of elementary school, students usually continue their education in secondary schools in Vukovar where they could attend classes in Serbian. The three most popular universities after high school are University of Novi Sad, University of Osijek and University of Belgrade.

=== Associations and Institutions ===
In the village exist a volunteer fire department Trpinja, folk Cultural and Artistic Association "MLADOST", Serbian Cultural Society "Prosvjeta", football club "Sinđelić", chess club "Trpinja", Hunting Association "Srndać" and Hunting Association "Trpinja", Association of subsidiaries of pensioners of Trpinja municipality and Subsidiary of pensioners of Trpinja, "Treća životna dob" ("Third age"), The association of anti-fascist fighters of the National Liberation War and Anti-Fascists of Trpinja municipality.

=== Sport ===
Local amateur football club Sinđelić, which is named after Stevan Sinđelić, has won several lower-league championships. In 2011 Sinđelić was a champion of the regional Veterans League of Joint Council of Municipalities. The Chess Club Trpinja is also active.

== Notable natives and residents ==
- Josif Milovuk, publisher and founder of Matica Srpska
- Katarina Bogdanović, writer, teacher, women's rights activist and philosopher
- Slavko Dokmanović, politician
- Jovan Perajlić, singer
- Spasoje Vukotić, priest, writer and translator

== Twin municipalities – Sister municipalities ==
- Bačka Palanka, Serbia

== See also ==
- Church of the Transfiguration of the Lord, Trpinja
- Joint Council of Municipalities
- Podunavlje (Croatia)

== Sources ==
- Barišić Bogišić, Lidija (2022). O neslavenskom stanovništvu na vukovarskom području. Hrvatska sveučilišna naklada. ISBN 978-953-169-497-1.
