= Church of the Transfiguration of the Lord, Trpinja =

Serbian Orthodox church in Trpinja, Croatia

Church of the Transfiguration of the Lord
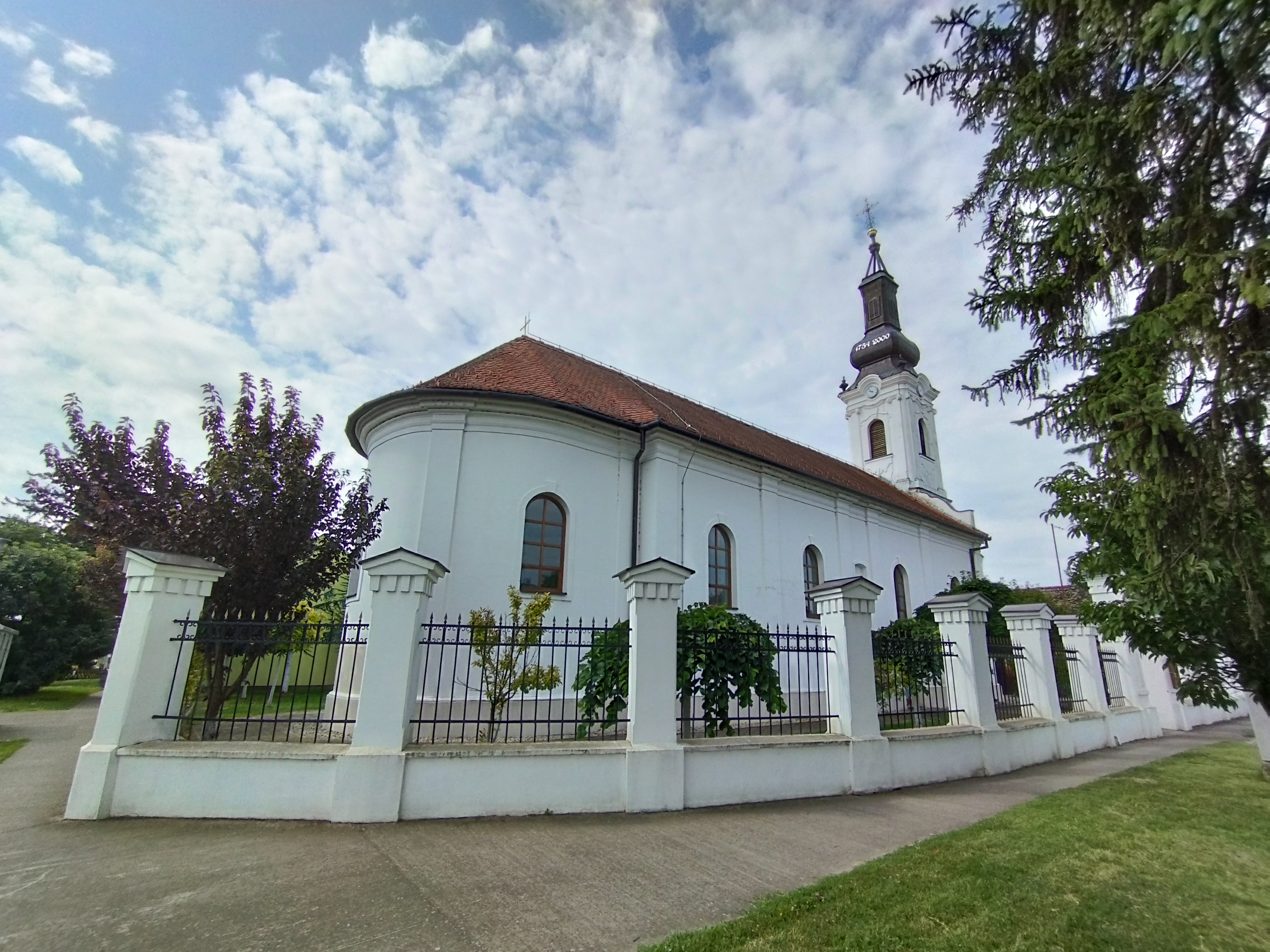
- Church of the Transfiguration of the Lord
- Church of the Transfiguration of the Lord
- 45°25′08″N 18°53′58″E
- Location: Velika 2; 32224 Trpinja; Vukovar-Syrmia County
- Country: Croatia
- Denomination: Serbian Orthodox

History
- Dedication: Transfiguration of the Lord

Architecture
- Style: Baroque and Classicism

Administration
- Archdiocese: Eparchy of Osijek Plain and Baranya

The Church of the Transfiguration of the Lord (Croatian: Hram Uznesenja Gospodnjeg, Serbian Cyrillic: Храм Вазнесења Господњег) in Trpinja is a Serbian Orthodox church in eastern Croatia. The first church on this site dates from 1753. The first Orthodox Serbs moved into Trpinja in 1527. From 1573 the Serbian Orthodox community has been the majority population. The church is listed in Register of Cultural Goods of Croatia and last renovation was completed in 2011.

== History ==
The older church at the site of the present day building was mentioned for the first time in 1695. The description of the church from 1733 mentioned that the lower part of the wall was built of stone, while the rest of it was made of wood, covered with mud covered with oak shingles. The building was consecrated by Nikanor Melentijević. The modern day building was completed in the mid XVIII century and it was consecrated by Sofronije Jovanović. Thirteen years after the new building was completed, there was six Eastern Orthodox priests at the church parish in Trpinja. Parish center was built in 1908. During World War II in Yugoslavia and the Genocide of Serbs in the Independent State of Croatia, the church was converted into a Roman Catholic church while the Đakovo-Osijek priest Stjepan Rade administered forced conversions.

== See also ==
- List of Serbian Orthodox churches in Croatia
- Eparchy of Osijek Plain and Baranya
- Serbs of Croatia
