= Josif Milovuk =

Serbian merchant & publisher (1787–1850)

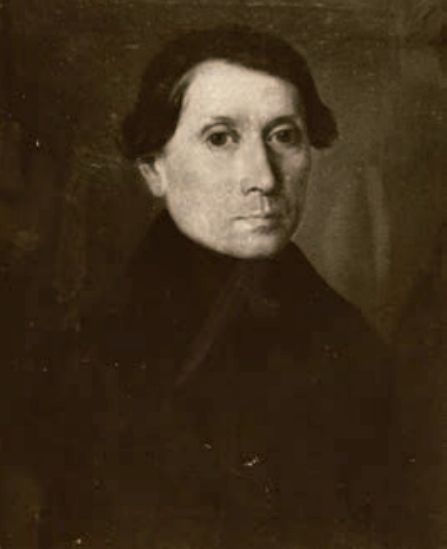
Josif Milovuk

Josif Milovuk (Trpinja, 10 April 1787 – Pest, 23 August 1850) was a successful merchant, book publisher, lithographer, and writer in the Austrian Empire. He was one of the founders of Matica srpska.

== Biography ==
He was born in the village Trpinja in Srem, to father Ilija and mother Pelagija, who died when Josif was nine years old. Even as a young man, he stood out with a strong sense of the cultural and educational progress of the Serbian people.

He attended primary school in his native village, and after finishing high school and École Polytechnique in Sremski Karlovci in 1814, Milovuk moved to Pest, where he began to trade.

After arriving in Pest, he started trading in canvas and then began collecting books, establishing contact with Serbian writers, and opening a bookstore. He published the books at his own expense and then sold them. Due to poor book sales at the time, he published advertisements informing the people about the printing of books, price, length and short contents of books. In 1821, he collected subscribers for Vuk Karadžić's "Narodne pesme".

He married Macarena Božitovac in 1822, who bore him three children, Milan, Dušan and Danica. Their best man was the merchant Georgije Stanković, and the second witness (stari svat) was Andrija Jovanović. Only after his marriage did he become a citizen Pest, although he had lived there since 1814.

He was a contemporary and friend of Vuk Karadžić, Sava Mrkalj, Jovan Sterija Popović and Joakim Vujić.

== Letopis and Matica srpska ==
In addition to trading and collecting books, Josif Milovuk helped many writers publish their works. After he was about to shut down his operation owing to low income but instead, he took the Letopis Matica Srpska over, under the same conditions for its editor Georgije Magarašević, under which it was issued until then. Milovuk paid Georgije Magarašević for the first issue of the magazine in 1826 and spent royalties for the next two. Due to the weak financial situation, he decided not to publish the Matica srpska organ Letopis alone, so together with his brother-in-law Gavrilo Bozitovac, he invested more money. After that, on 18 January 1826, Milovuk invited the participation of traders, buyers, and merchants from Pest, Petar Rajić, Jovan Demetrović, Andrej Rozmirović, and Djordje Stanković. Everyone accepted Milovuk's idea but still showed some caution. Although the previous agreement was "that there is no championship over the other", Jovan Hadžić demanded at the founding meeting that "one chairman be appointed". The merchants did not like that, but they did not want to hinder the final formation of that patriotic society. During the meeting, after investing some 700 forints. In a "chest", the company was named Matica srpska, Jovan Hadžić was elected president, Josif Milovuk was elected general manager, and Jovan Demetrović was elected treasurer (he had a wooden chest, which was opened with two keys), and Gavrilo Bozitovac and Djordje Stanković for "locksmiths of a multi-story chest" (each with one key).

At the very beginning of their work at Matica, a problem arose regarding its legal status. Josif Milovuk was in favour of immediately asking for a work permit in Vienna, and Hadžić, as president, was against it. That is why Milovuk, at a meeting on 3 May 1826, with two other founders, "erased himself from the number of contributors." Those who belonged to Matica Hadžić and Andrej Rozmirović returned, and after only three months, although deserving as founders, they stopped being members of Matica.

Due to his disagreement with Jovan Hadžić, Milovuk left Matica srpska, turned around and established cooperation with Vuk Karadžić and published his works, "Miloš Obrenović, Prince of Serbia" and "Danica". The disagreement and conflict with Jovan Hadžić became even greater because he was an opponent of "Vuk's reform". Milovuk devoted himself entirely to publishing; he published works by Sima Milutinović Sarajlija, Dositej Obradović, Jovan Sterija Popović and many others.

Together with Gavrilo Bozitovac, who also resigned from Matica srpska, he published a large number of works by Serbian authors, almanacs, and maps. In 1826, they published "Hristoitija" and "Venac od alfavita" by Dositej Obradović, and in 1826, "Characteristics or descriptions of the people living in the whole country of Avram Branković". In addition to all that, Milovuk himself published "Zorica", the book Sima Milutinović Sarajlija, Imeslov or Dictionary of personal names of various Slavic peoples "(1828) Jovan Pačić and Ján Kollár, "Prince Lazar, Tsar of Serbia" (1831) by Jefta Popović, "Life and Knightly Wars of the Glorious Prince of Epirus George Kastriot Skenderbeg" (1827), Jovan Sterija Popović, "Vladimir and Kosara" (1829), Laza K. Lazarević. Vuk Stefanović Karadžić helped to publish "Danica" in 1829, and he wrote him a dedication in the entertainer as a token of gratitude. As a sign of gratitude, Jovan Hadžić (under the pseudonym "Miloš Svetić") also wrote "Ode to Master Josif Milovuk".

In 1833, Milovuk tried to found the "Society Of Serbian Letters" (Literary Society) and on St. George's Day gathered a large number of interested people, among whom were Jovan Vilovski, Slovak Ján Kollár, Laza K. Lazarević, but they did not get the consent of the Austrian emperor, who estimated that such a society would encourage the awakening of the Serbian national consciousness.

In 1827, he donated a large number of books to the library of the church community in Pest, and was one of the 48 contributors to the Belgrade City Library, which he founded with Gligorije Vozarović in 1832.

== See also ==
- Matica srpska
- Jovan Hadžić
