= Pačetin =

Pačetin Пачетин (Serbian)
- Village (Selo)
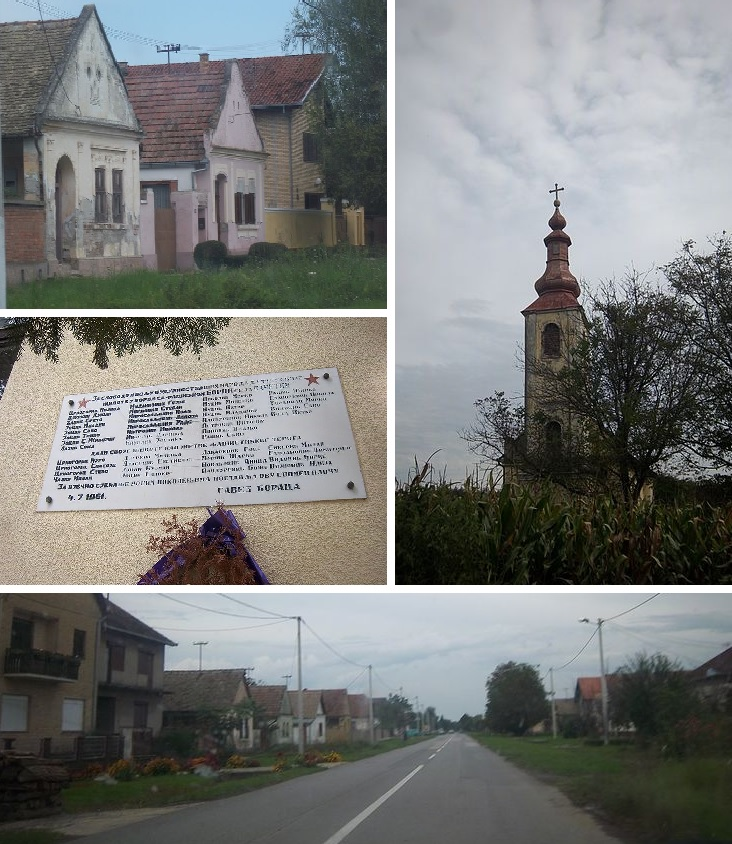

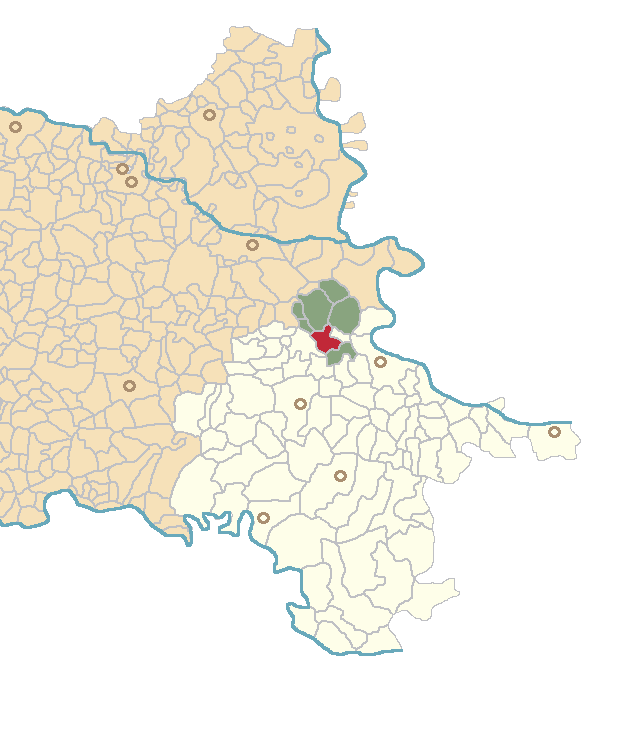

- Location within Vukovar-Syrmia County Location within Croatia Location within Europe
- Coordinates: 45.376°N 18.851°E
- Country: Croatia
- Region: Slavonia (Podunavlje)
- County: Vukovar-Syrmia
- Municipality: Trpinja

Government
  - Body: Local Committee

Area
  - Total: 18.1 km^{2} (7.0 sq mi)

Population (2021)
  - Total: 381
  - Density: 21.0/km^{2} (54.5/sq mi)
- Demonym(s): Pačetinac (♂) Pačetinka (♀) (per grammatical gender)
- Postal code: 32222 Bršadin
- Area code: +385 32
- Vehicle registration: VU
- Official languages: Croatian, Serbian

Pačetin (Serbian Cyrillic: Пачетин, Hungarian: Pacsinta) is a village in the municipality of Trpinja, Vukovar-Syrmia County in the easternmost part of Croatia. At the time of the 2011 Census the population of the village was 541. Village lies north of the Vuka River and west of the M601 railway. Its major landmark is the Church of St. Nicholas from the 18th century. County road Ž4111 passing through the villages of Pačetin, Bobota and Vera connects all three villages with D2 road and D55 road. Pačetin is 28.6 km southeast of Osijek, the economic and cultural centre of Slavonia and 17.2 km from the Osijek Airport. County seat Vukovar is 17.3 km east of Pačetin.

== Geography ==
Absolute altitudes of the village is 87 meters above the sea level. Pačetin is located two kilometers away from the Vuka River.

== History ==
First information about Pačetin come from the 1275. At the place of present-day village during the Middle Ages there were three villages with three churches. Louis I of Hungary permitted weekly trade fairs in Pačetin. In 1498 Pačetin gained town status and the medieval Vukovar County Assembly were held in it. After the Ottoman–Hungarian wars and Ottoman conquest of Hungary Pačetin population decreased. Following Ottoman retreat from the region, the Lordship of Vukovar was established, and the village became part of its domain in 1725. After the withdrawal of the Ottoman Empire after the Treaty of Karlowitz of 1666, Pačetin was settled by Serbs mainly from Mačva, eastern Bosnia and Montenegro, and at the beginning of the 18th century, there were over 40 Serbian houses. A century later there were twice as many houses and inhabitants, and at the peak in 1905 there were 1109 inhabitants in Pačetin, of which 1066 were Serbs. From 27 December 1920 (when they arrived in Vukovar) soldiers and families of the White Russian émigrés who were followers of Pyotr Wrangel settled in Bobota, Pačetin, Bršadin, Trpinja and Vera.

On 20 December 1993 the village was blocked by protest of the 40th brigade of the 11th corpus of the Army of the Republic of Serbian Krajina. They requested a pay rise and improved status for soldiers.

== Education ==
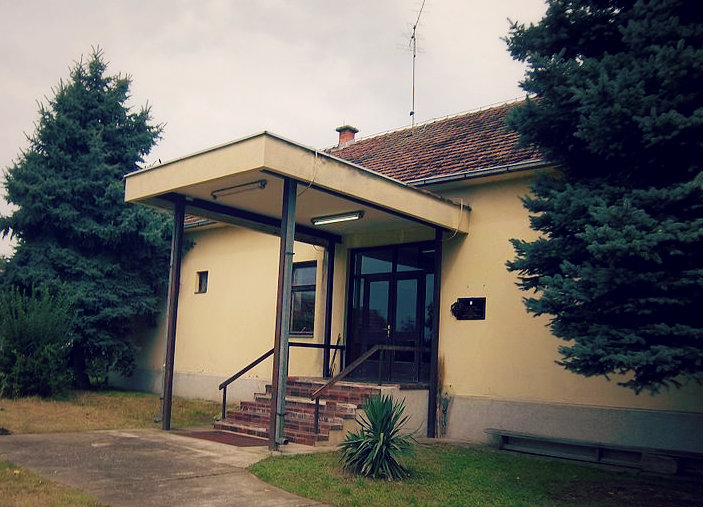
local school

The first records that prove the existence of the school in Pačetin were made on 18 July 1788 which stated that 38 children attended the classes, 19 in the first and second grade, and 76 children at all. This report is today kept in the National Archives of Hungary. Between 1788 until the 1922 there is no records about the school in Pačetin. In 1957 the school was an independent six-year primary school, after that a branch of the elementary school in Nuštar, then branch of the "Braća Đurđević" Elementary School in Vukovar and since 1992 and establishment of SAO Eastern Slavonia, Baranja and Western Syrmia until today it became branch school of the Bobota Elementary School. Branch school of Elementary school Bobota is located in Pačetin, 4,4 kilometers away from mother school in Bobota. Education at local school is carried out in Serbian. The school building have two classrooms, a kitchen, bathroom and central heating on electrical energy. In 2010 local branch of Prosvjeta published monograph 220 godina školstva u Pačetinu (English: 220 years of schooling in Pačetin).

== Population ==
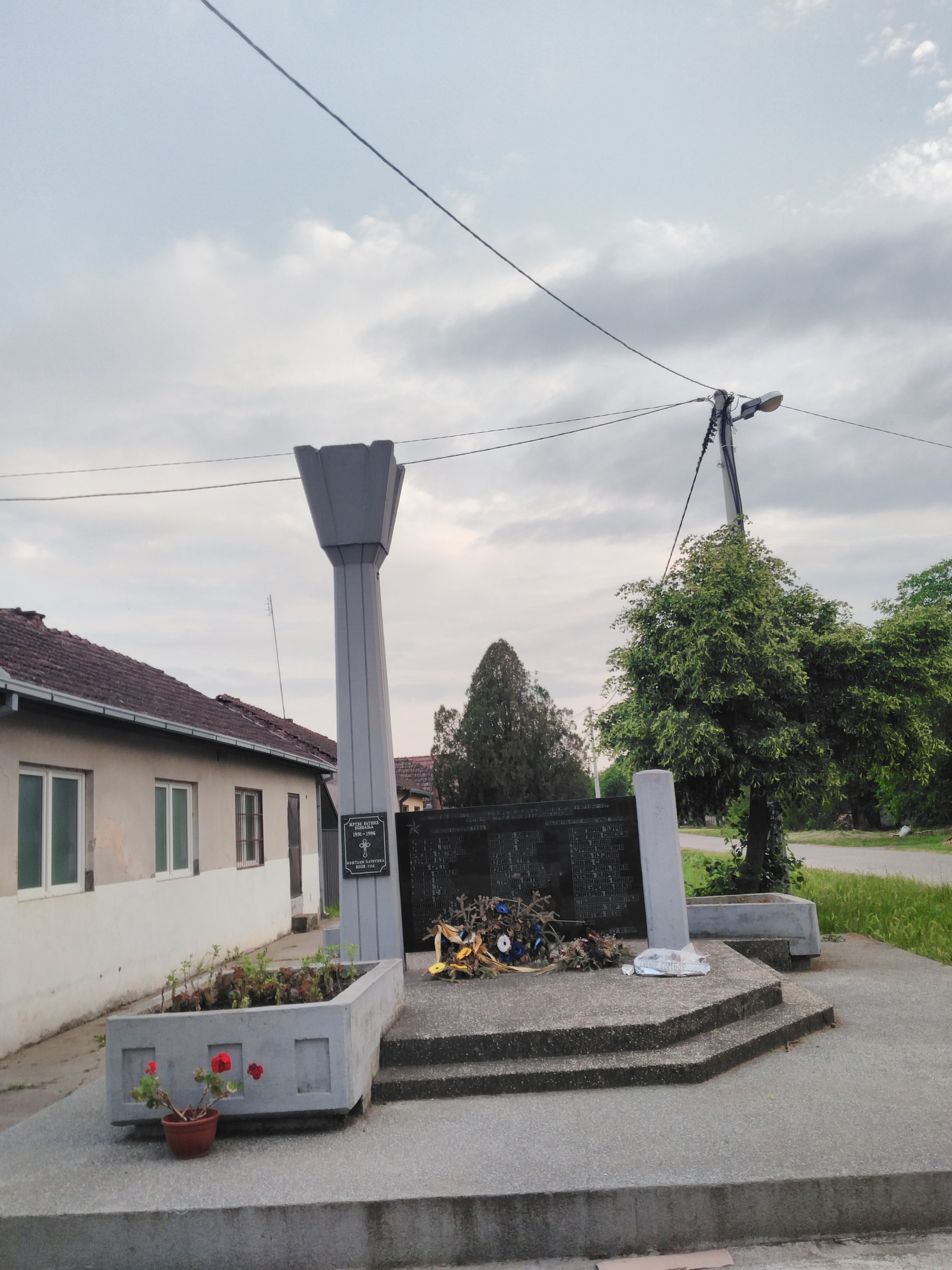
National Liberation War monument in Pačetin.

History of the number of inhabitants 1857.-2001. + Census 2011
v

population	826	916	988	1056	1109	1166	1073	1110	896	878	983	973	925	851	668	548
	1857	1869	1880	1890	1900	1910	1921	1931	1948	1953	1961	1971	1981	1991	2001	2011

Sources:Croatian Bureau of Statistics publications

According to the 1991 census, the village was inhabited by a majority of Serbs (88.48%), and minority of Yugoslavs (6.93%) and Croats (3.17%).

== Languages ==
=== Serbian language ===
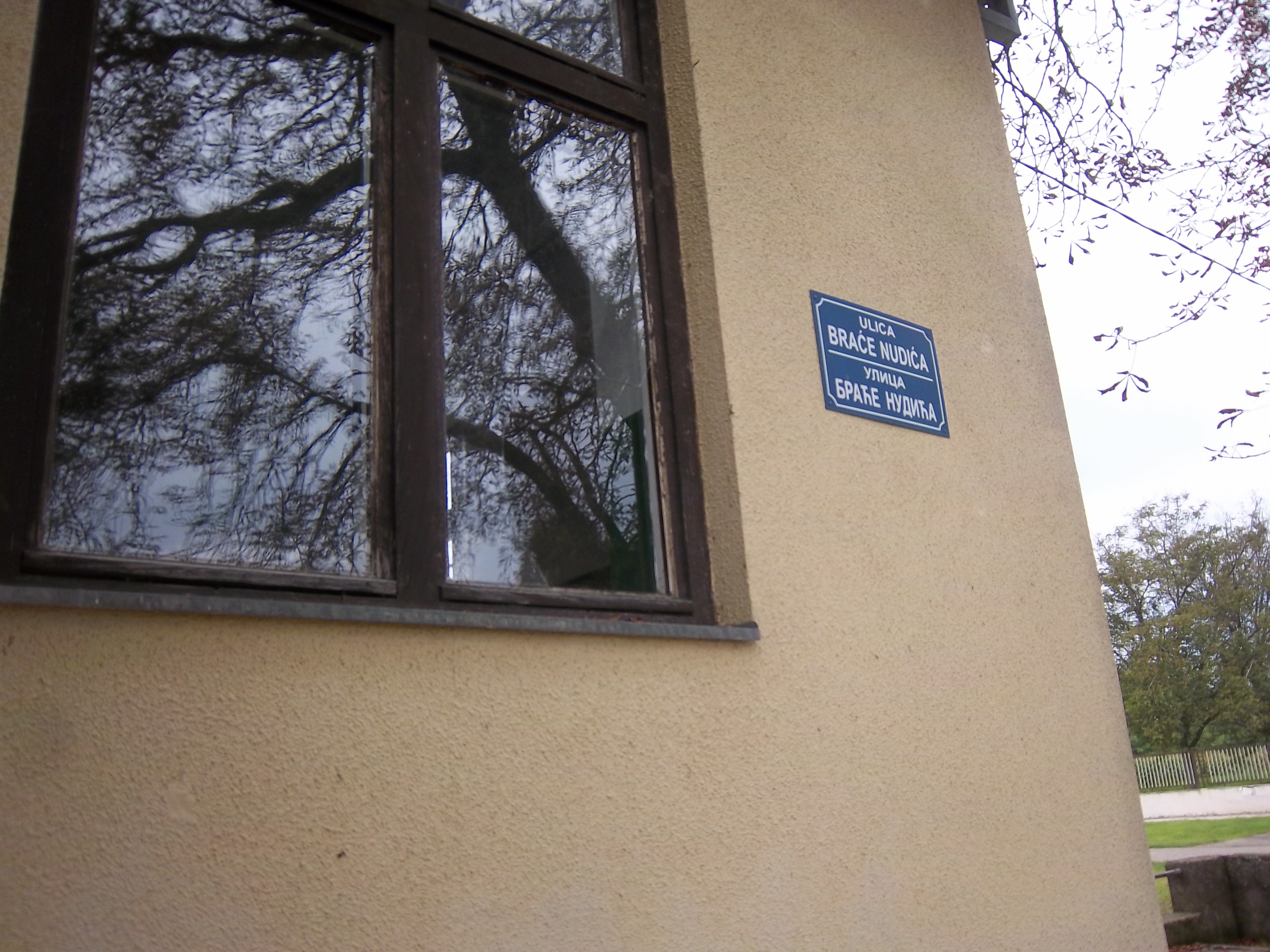
Bilingual street name.

Serbian Language and Serbian Cyrillic alphabet is the second official language in most of the villages of the Municipality of Trpinja (except Ćelije) alongside the Croatian language which is official at the national level. Both Serbian and Croatian language are standardized varieties of the pluricentric Serbo-Croatian language. According to the Municipal Statute, individuals who are members of the Serbian national minority are ensured the freedom of expression of national belonging and freedom to use their language and script in public and private use on the whole territory of the Municipality including the village of Pačetin. The statute guarantees that the Serbian Cyrillic alphabet will be used in the same font size as the Latin alphabet in the text of the local seals and stamps, on official plates of public representatives, executive and administrative bodies, as well as on those of legal persons with public authorities.

According to the municipal Statute, bilingual signs of the same font are used for written traffic signs and other written traffic markings, street and squares names and names of settlement and geographical localities on the entire territory of the Municipality. Equal public use of Serbian language is required on the basis of the Constitutional Act on the Rights of National Minorities in the Republic of Croatia and relevant national laws and the country is a party to the European Charter for Regional or Minority Languages.

== Points of Interest ==
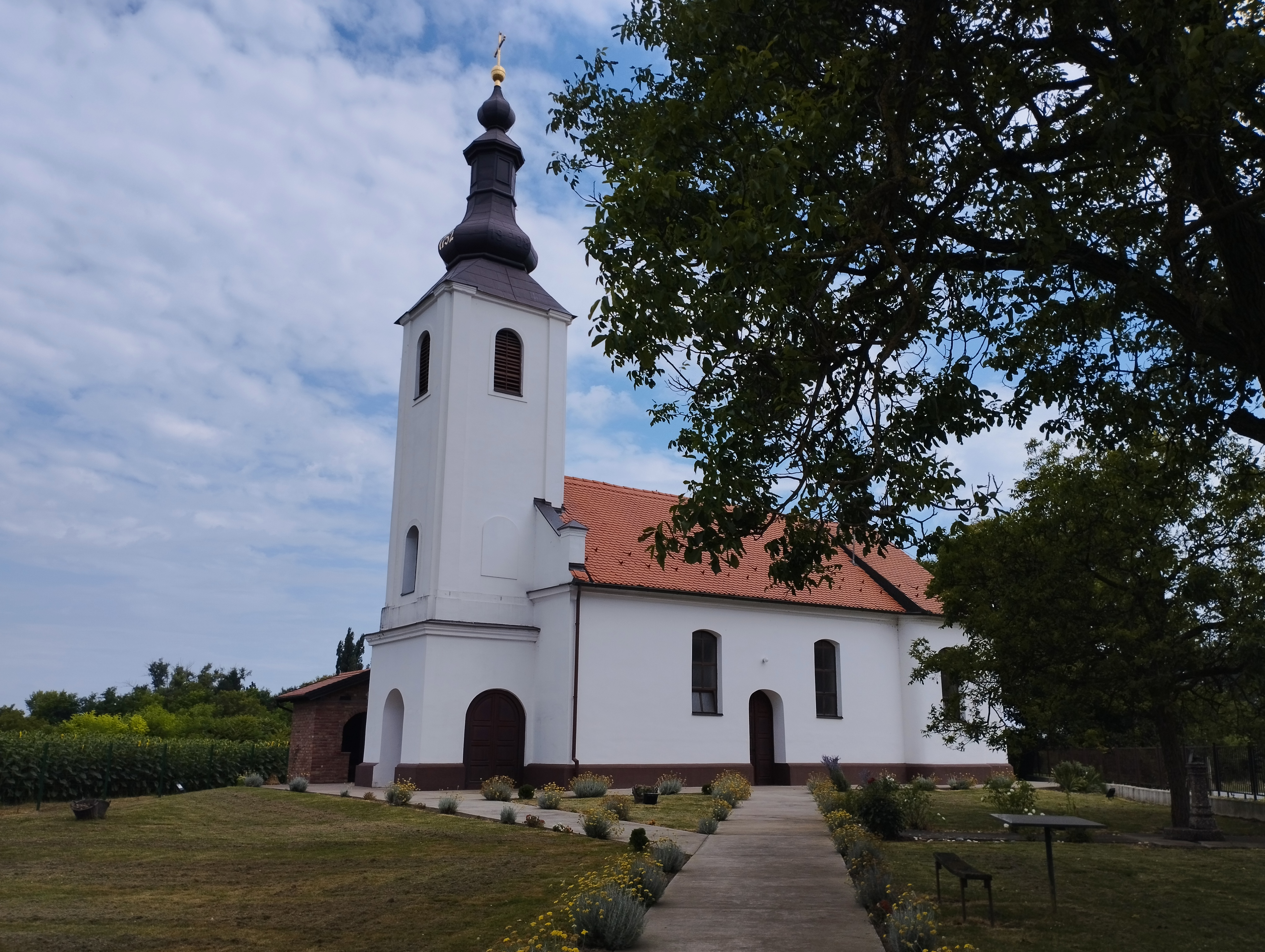
Church of St. Nicholas, Pačetin

St. Nicholas's Church in Pačetin is a Serbian Orthodox church known for its iconostasis from 1910. Construction of St. Nicholas's Church in Pačetin started in 1752 and the work was finished in three years, so that it was blessed in 1755.

== Associations and Institutions ==
Cultural and Artistic Association Branko Radičević is active in village since 1999. Local drama group, children drama group and reciting section are active as a part of Association. They are organizers of MESDI-International Meetings of Drama Amateurs and Saint Sava Oration.

== Sport ==
- Football club Sloga
- Chess club "Šahovski klub Sloga Pačetin"

== Notable natives and residents ==
- Goran Hadžić, Serbian general accused of crimes against humanity

== Gallery ==
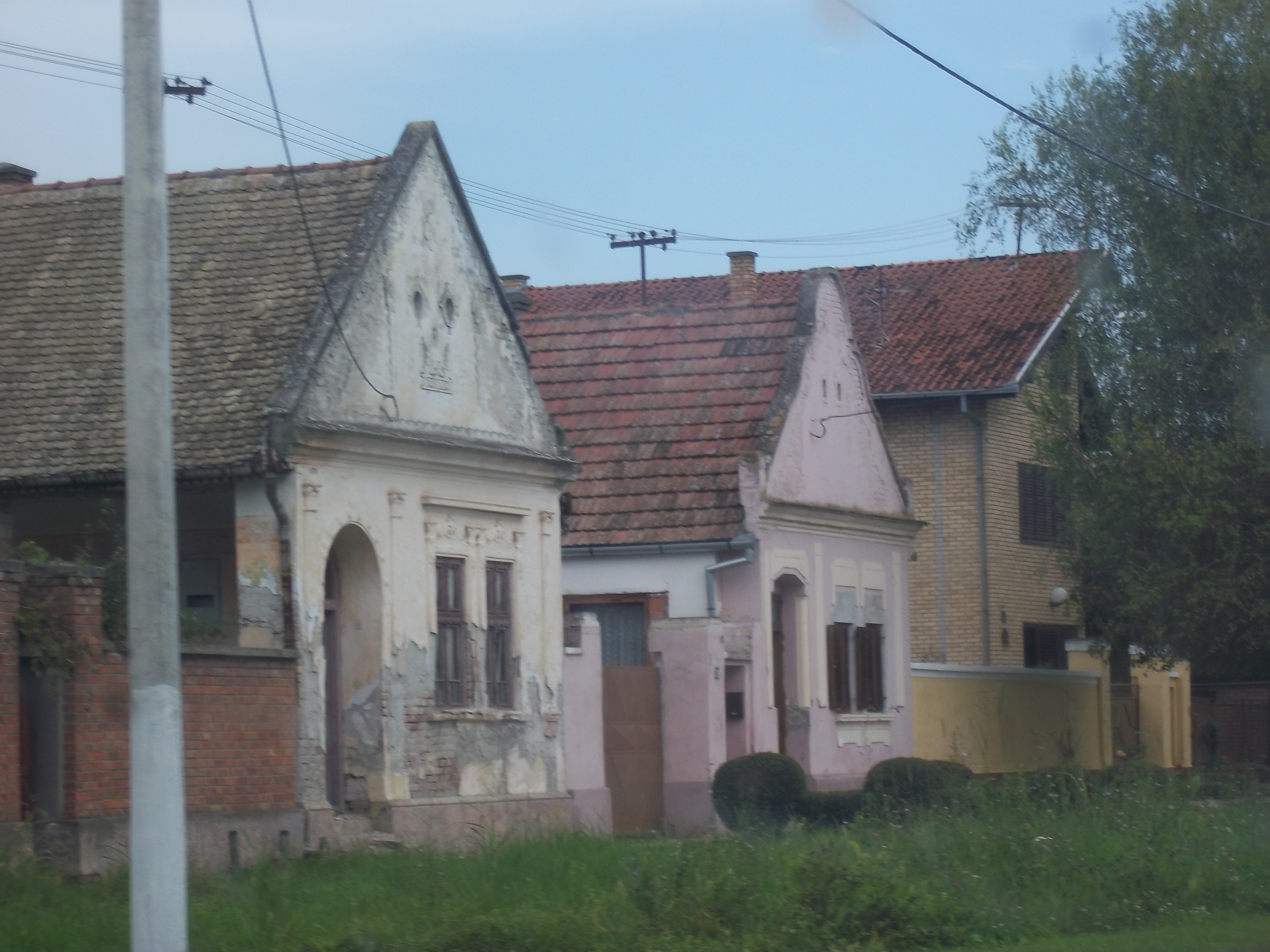

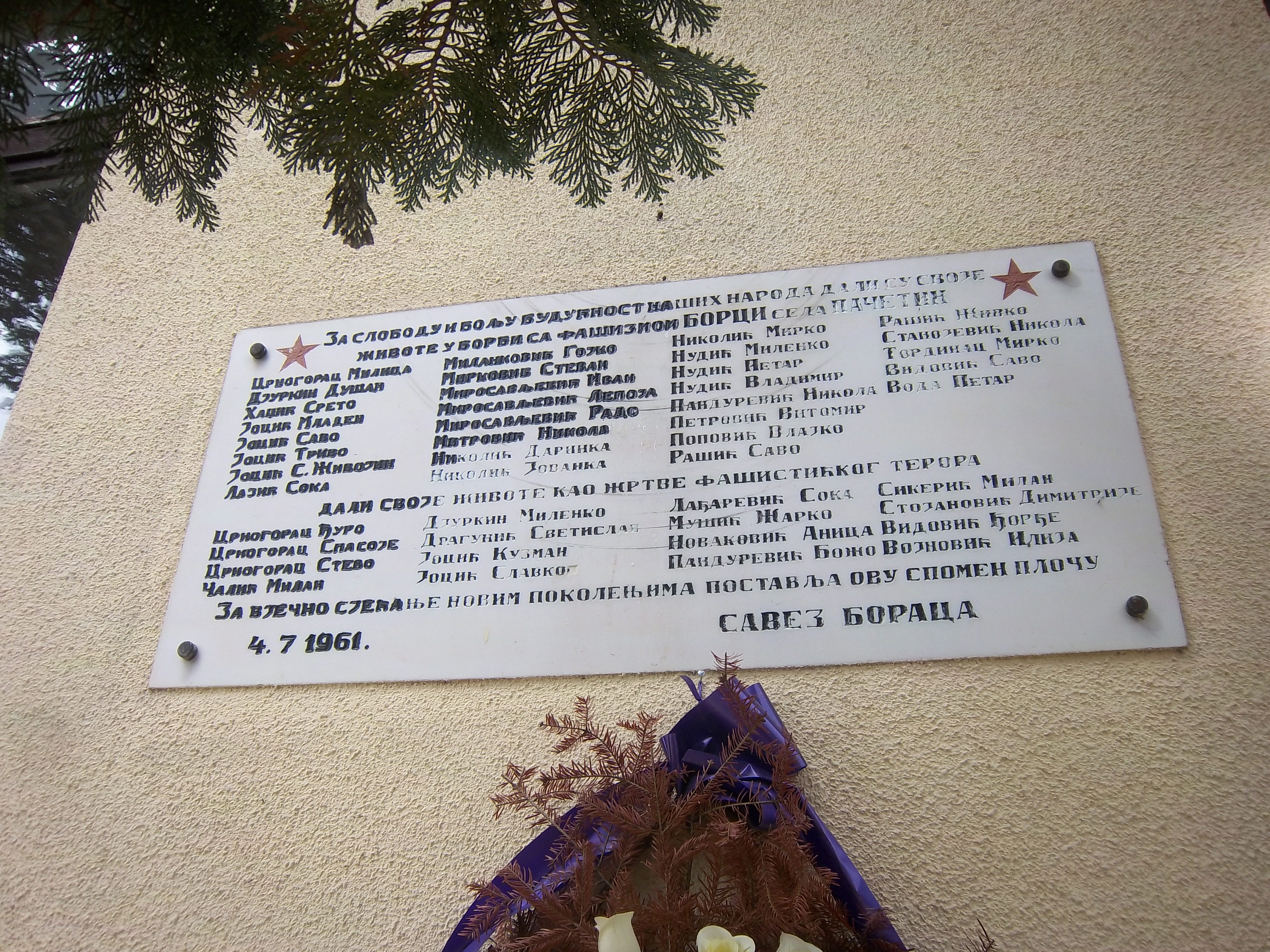

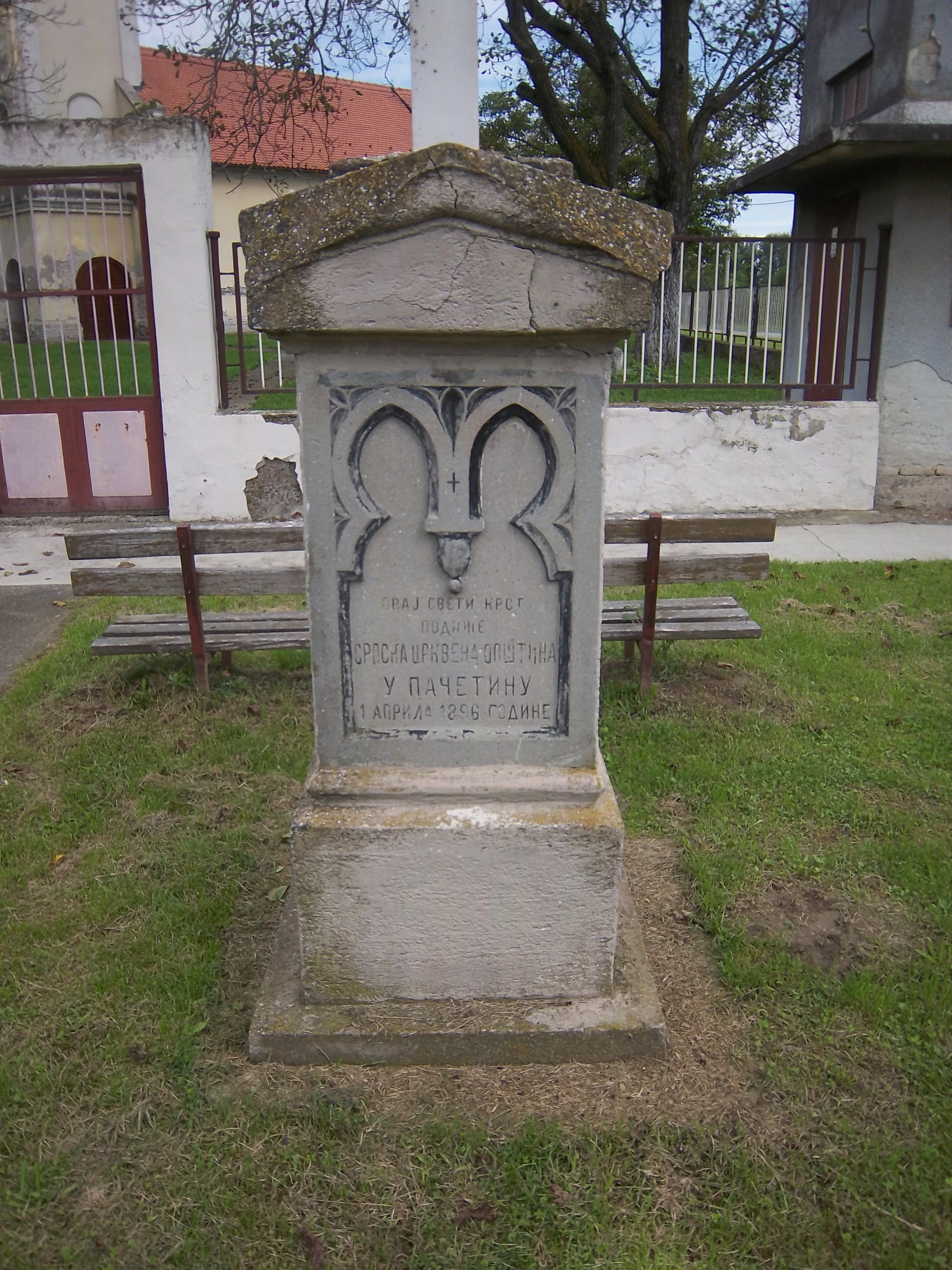

== See also ==
- Trpinja municipality

== Sources ==
- Barišić Bogišić, Lidija (2022). O neslavenskom stanovništvu na vukovarskom području. Hrvatska sveučilišna naklada. ISBN 978-953-169-497-1.
