= Church of St. Nicholas, Pačetin =

Church of St. Nicholas
- Hram svetog Nikole; Храм светог Николе
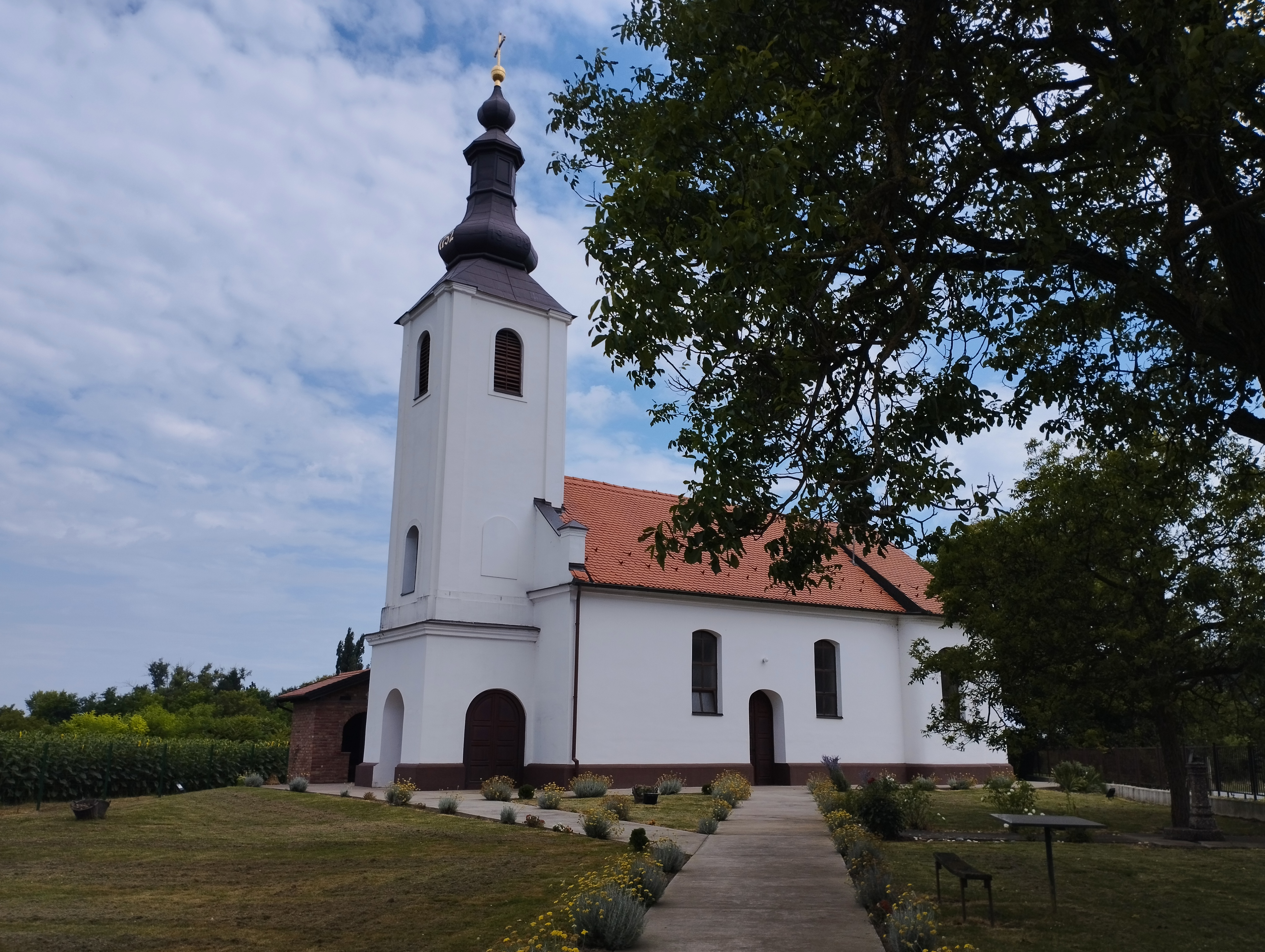
- Church of St. Nicholas
- Church of St. Nicholas
- 45.376°N 18.851°E
- Location: Pačetin
- Country: Croatia
- Denomination: Serbian Orthodox

History
- Dedication: St. Nicholas

Architecture
- Style: Baroque and Classicism

Administration
- Archdiocese: Eparchy of Osječko polje and Baranja

Church of St. Nicholas (Croatian: Hram svetog Nikole, Serbian Cyrillic: Храм светог Николе) in Pačetin is a Serbian Orthodox church in eastern Croatia. The church is dedicated to St. Nicholas.

== History ==
The building of the St. Nicholas Church in Pačetin started in 1752 and the construction works were finished in three years period so that it was blessed in 1755 by the Bishops of Pakrac Sofronije Jovanović. At that time, three Orthodox priests practiced religious services in the village. The church was reconstructed several times in its history with 1908 reconstruction being the first one, 1958 the second and 1986 the third reconstruction with the renovation work still in progress in 2018.

The new church iconostasis was erected in 1910 and it was the work of painter Ivan Tišov. Iconostasis was commissioned by the Government of Kingdom of Croatia-Slavonia, nominally autonomous kingdom within the Austro-Hungarian Empire, with the aim to create higher quality in the standards of equipment of sacral edifices for both the Orthodox and the Catholic churches within the kingdom.

== Architecture ==
The architectural framework for the iconostasis is designed in the Byzantine Revival architecture style which was the most frequently used style in the late 19th and early 20th century design of Orthodox churches in Croatia, while most of the design elements are based on the classical origin. The compositional structure of iconostasis and the style of painting are in line with the Western academic traditions of painting. Some icons show the elements of Secession with the icon of the Virgin's on the top of the iconostasis having the most elements of Secession. Old iconostasis from the 1891 was painted by Đorđe Rakić from Neština. During the World War II, the Church of St. Nicholas was turned into Roman Catholic church by the authorities of the Independent State of Croatia. Ustashas damaged the iconostasis and parish house and robbed part of the church inventory.

During the Croatian War of Independence in 1991, the church was hit with two shells that damaged its altar section. In the early 2000s, the church attracted attention among Orthodox and some Catholic believers when story about a weeping icon of Saint Nicholas appeared in regional and national media.

== See also ==
- Eparchy of Osječko polje and Baranja
- Pačetin
- Serbs of Croatia
