= Bršadin =

Bršadin Бршадин (Serbian)
- Village (Selo)
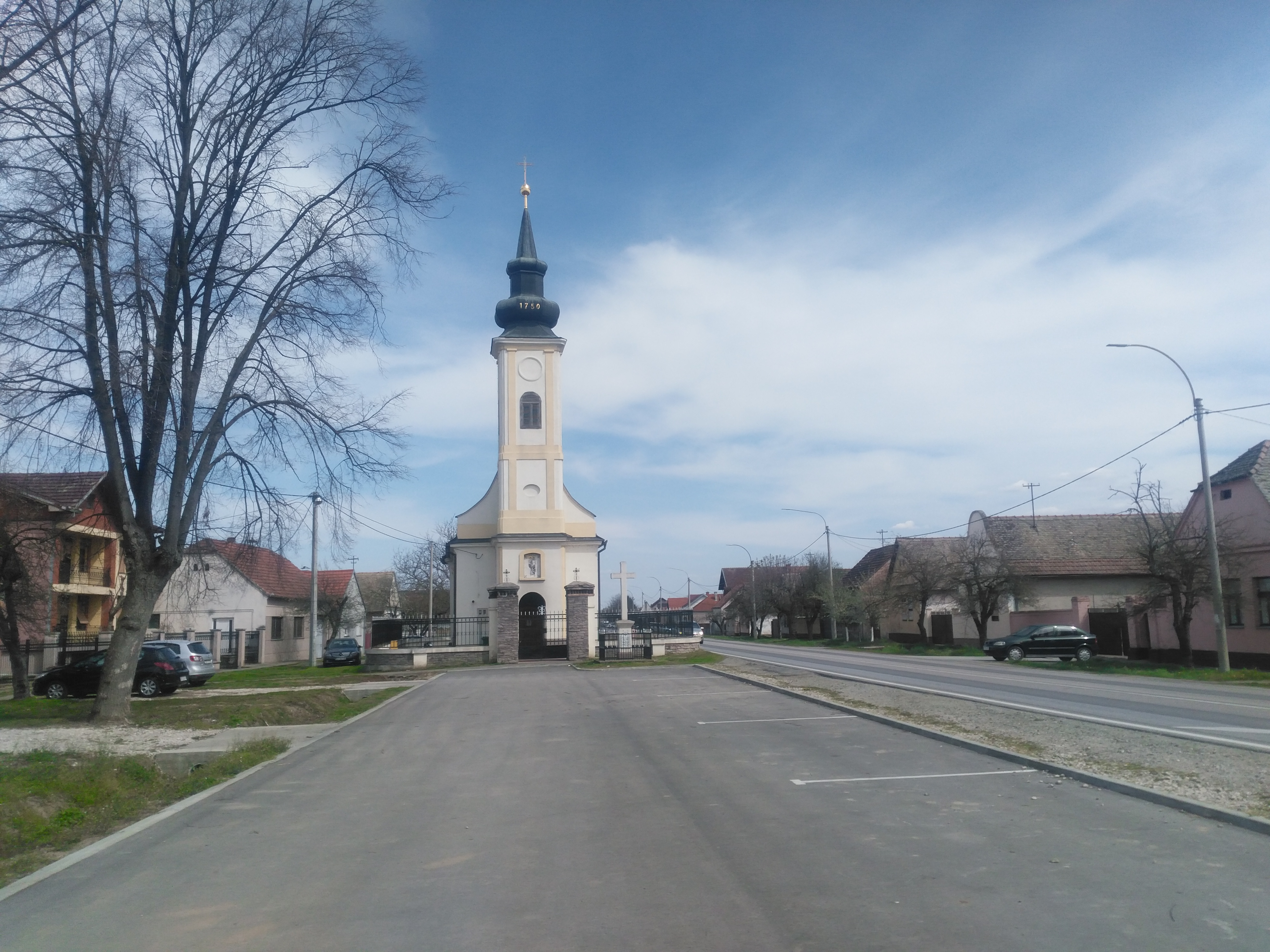
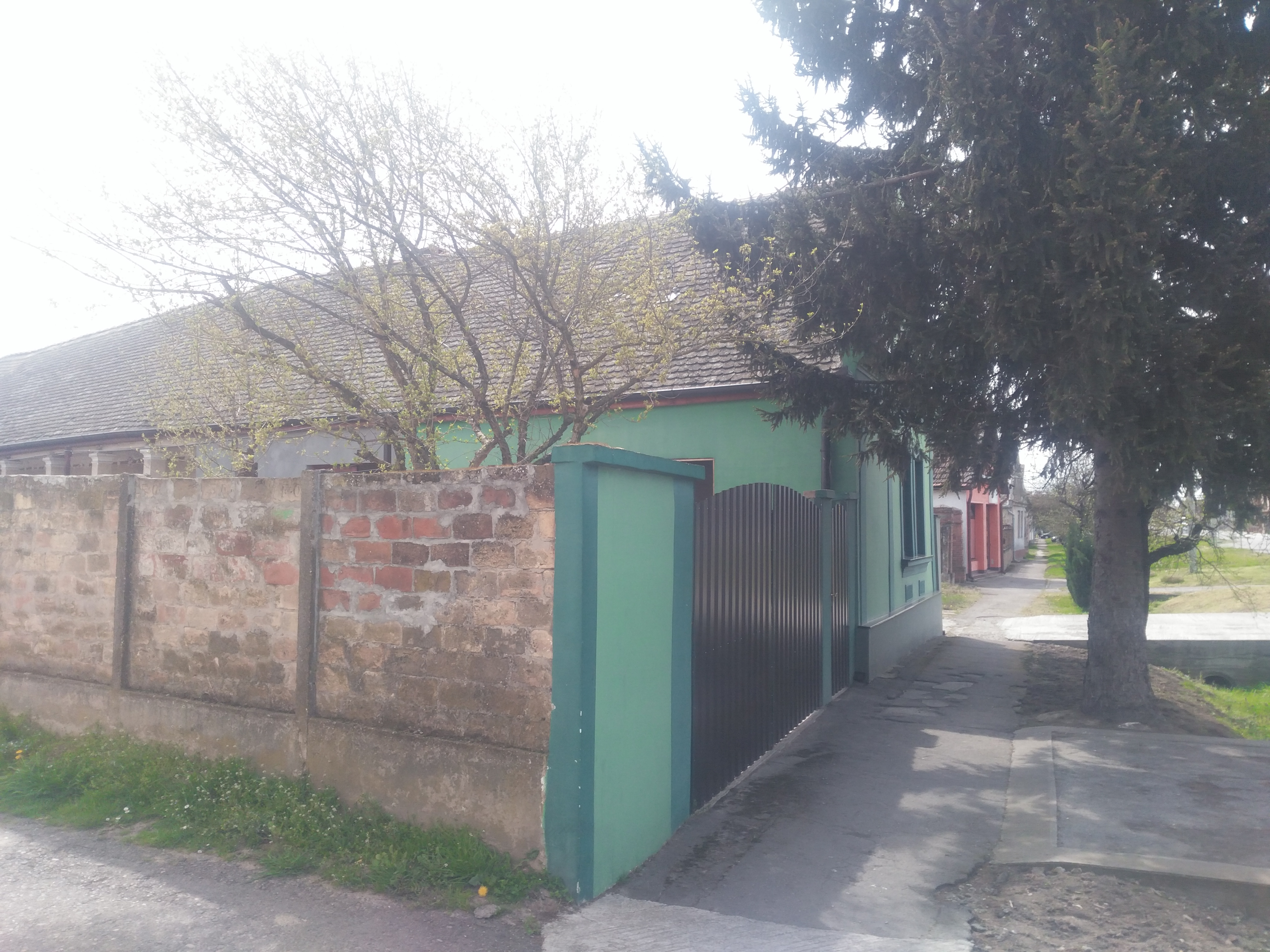
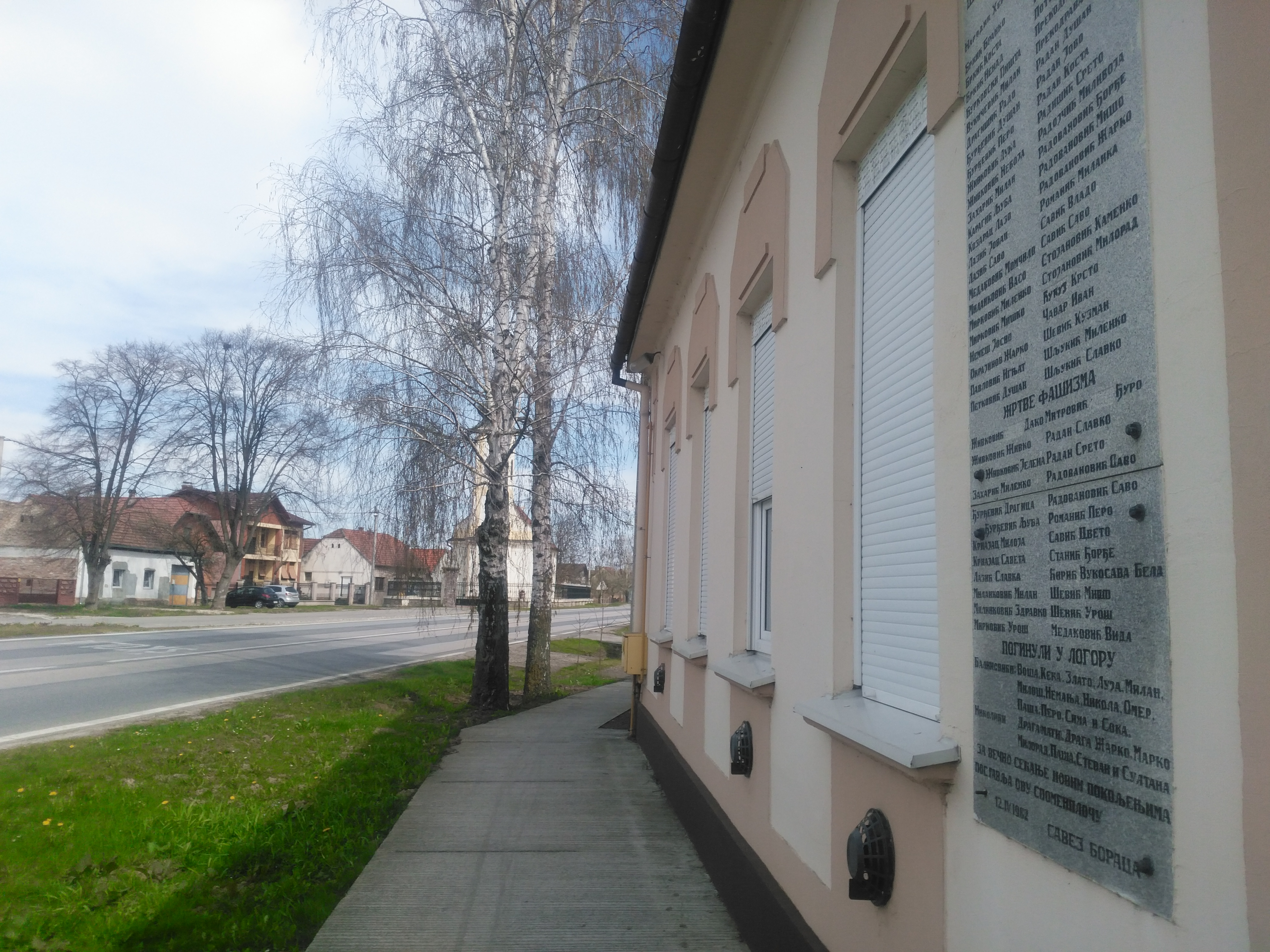
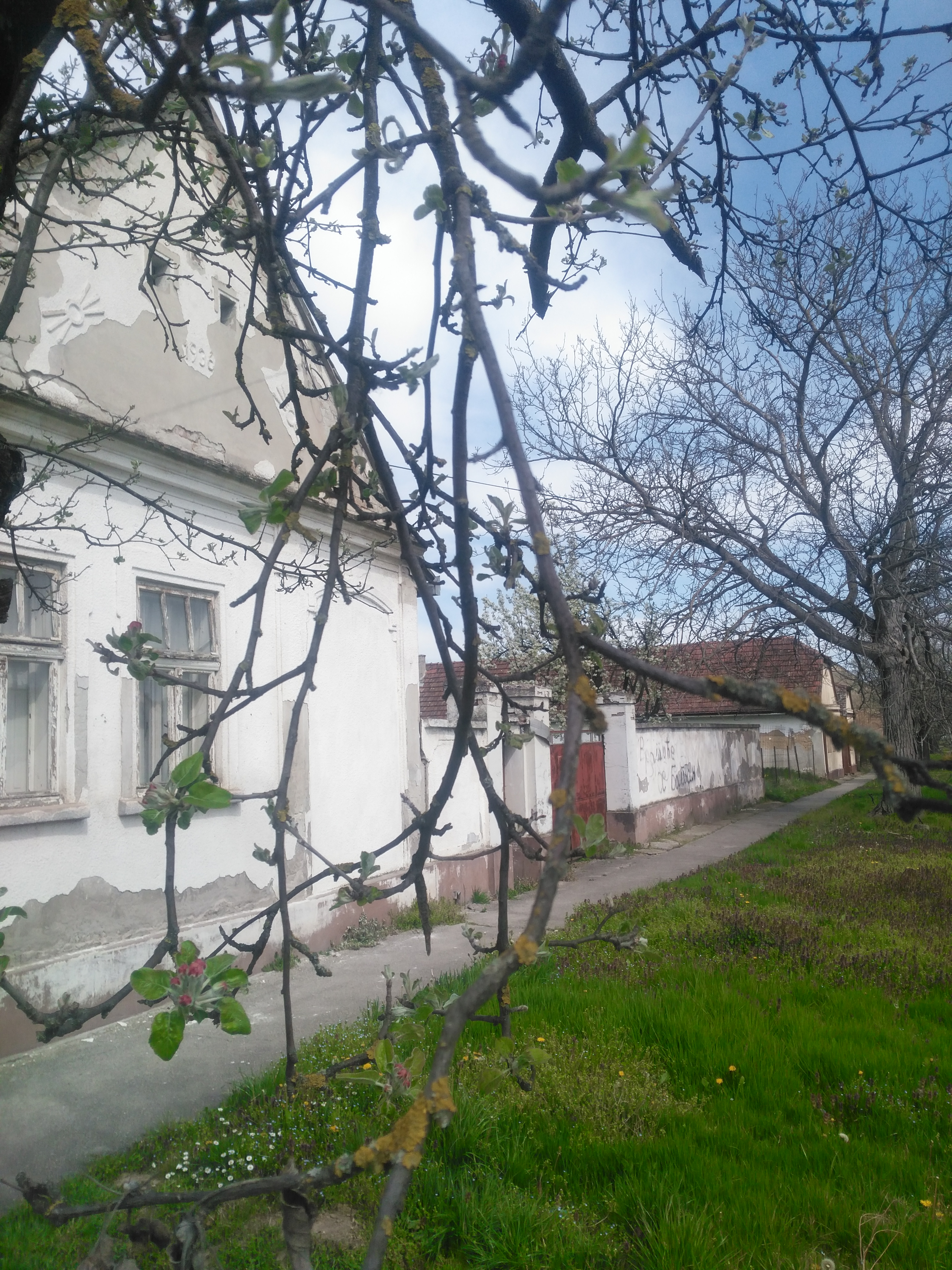
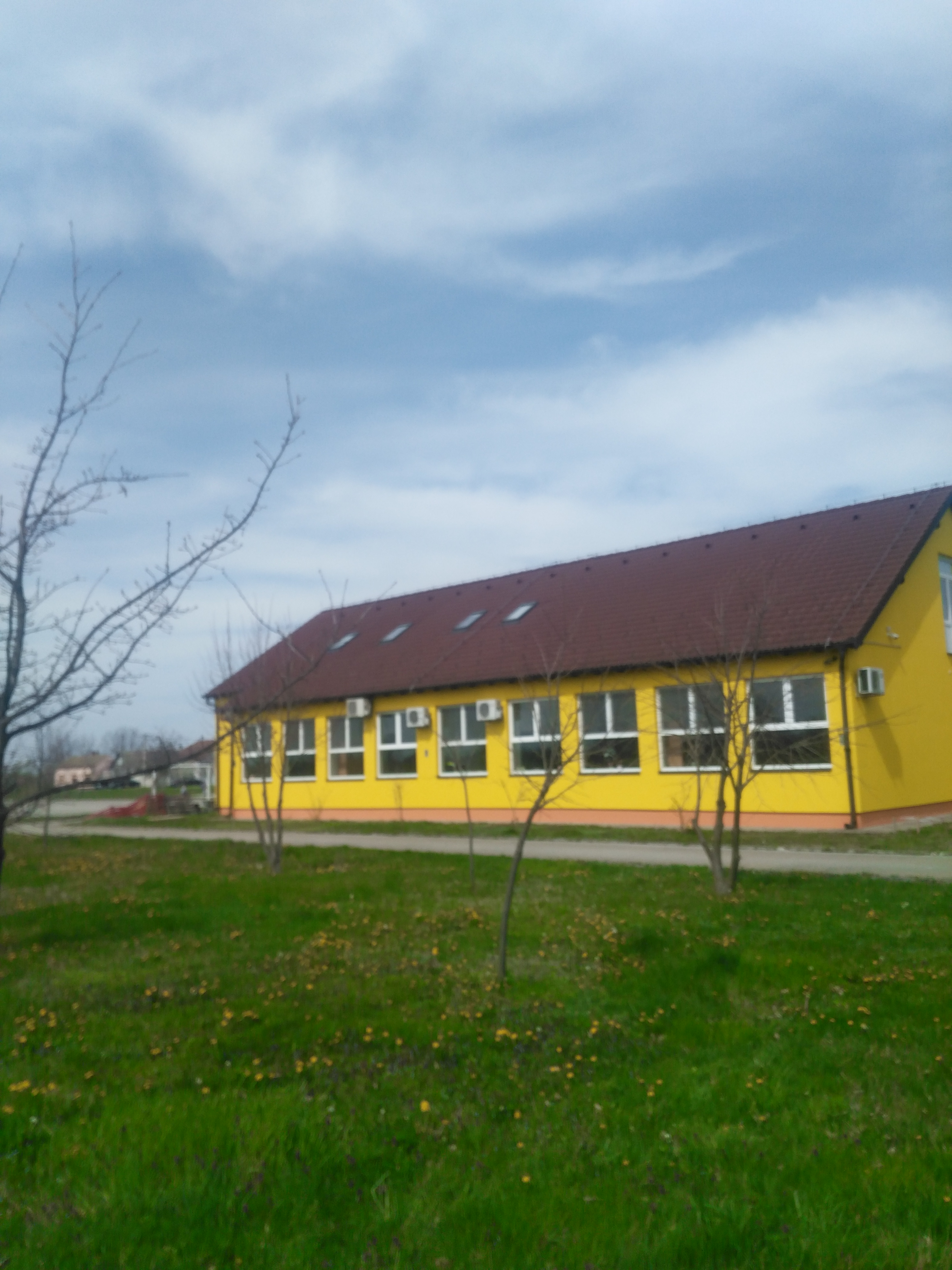
- Serbian Orthodox Church Traditional village house World War II memorial Traditional village house Elementary School

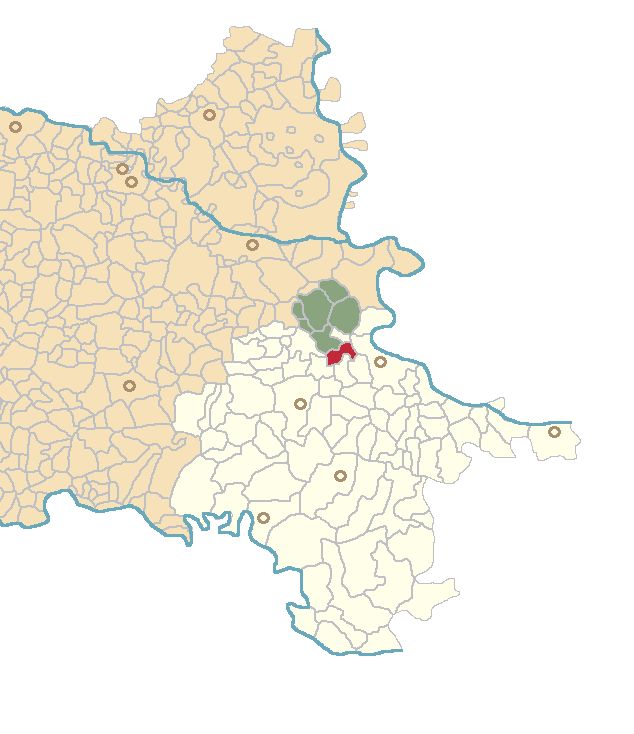

- Location within Vukovar-Syrmia County Location within Croatia Location within Europe
- Coordinates: 45°22′N 18°55′E
- Country: Croatia
- Region: Syrmia (Podunavlje)
- County: Vukovar-Syrmia
- Municipality: Trpinja

Government
  - Body: Local Committee

Area
  - Total: 14.1 km^{2} (5.4 sq mi)

Population (2021)
  - Total: 931
  - Density: 66.0/km^{2} (171/sq mi)
- Demonym(s): Bršadinac (♂) Bršadinka (♀) (per grammatical gender)
- Time zone: UTC+1 (CET)
  - Summer (DST): UTC+2 (CEST)
- Vehicle registration: VU
- Official languages: Croatian, Serbian

Bršadin (Serbian Cyrillic: Бршадин, Hungarian: Borsod) is a village in the Trpinja Municipality in Croatian easternmost Vukovar-Syrmia County. Bršadin is located north of the Vuka river and west of the town of Vukovar on the main road to Vinkovci.

== Geography ==
Bršadin is third-largest settlement in the municipality, after Trpinja and Bobota. It is located on the D55 highway between the towns of Vukovar and Vinkovci. Bršadin is surrounded by a villages Bogdanovci and Marinci on south, Pačetin on west, Lipovača on the north and city Vukovar on the east. Agricultural land and forests are the main characteristics of the surrounding area. Bobota Canal is located next to the village.

== History ==
=== Before the 20th century ===
Bršadin is first mentioned in historical sources in 1279 under the name Boršod. Boršod was located on an elevated area known as the "Old Village", about two kilometers west of the present day settlement.> Boršod decays after 1526 Ottoman Empire breakthrough into Syrmia and Slavonia. After 1529, Suleiman the Magnificent colonized place with first Orthodox families, Vlachs from north Serbia and north-eastern Bosnia, and after 1543 people from the central part of the Balkans peninsula. Following Ottoman retreat from the region, the Lordship of Vukovar was established, and the village became part of its domain in 1725.

=== Since 1900 ===
==== World War I ====
In 1914, at the beginning of World War I, Austro-Hungarian military command mobilization. Bršadin people disliked mobilization aside Triple Entente and they deserted in large numbers and taught to Russian army at Eastern Front or join Serbian army at Salonika front.

During the war, a military hospital with 7000 beds, colloquially known as "Wooden Vienna", was located in the village.

From 27 December 1920 (when they arrived in Vukovar) soldiers and families of the White Russian émigrés who were followers of Pyotr Wrangel settled in Bobota, Pačetin, Bršadin, Trpinja and Vera.

==== World War II ====
In first days of occupation, Đurđević family were sentenced to death and shot on January 17, 1942, in Dudik, a location near Vukovar where 455 victims were executed. In the spring of 1944, Vaso Đurđević-Turčin, the last of Đurđević brothers, leader of Bršadin partisan and People's hero. In his honor, today at the center of village stands remembrance monument.

==== Croatian War of Independence ====
During the Croatian War of Independence Bršadin was within self-proclaimed Serb political entity SAO Eastern Slavonia, Baranja and Western Syrmia. On December 20, 1993, the village was blocked by protest of the 40th brigade of the 11th corpus of the Army of the Republic of Serbian Krajina. They requested a pay rise and improved status for soldiers. In the final stages of conflict United Nations Mission conducted peaceful reintegration this region into Croatian jurisdiction.

== Languages ==
=== Serbian language ===
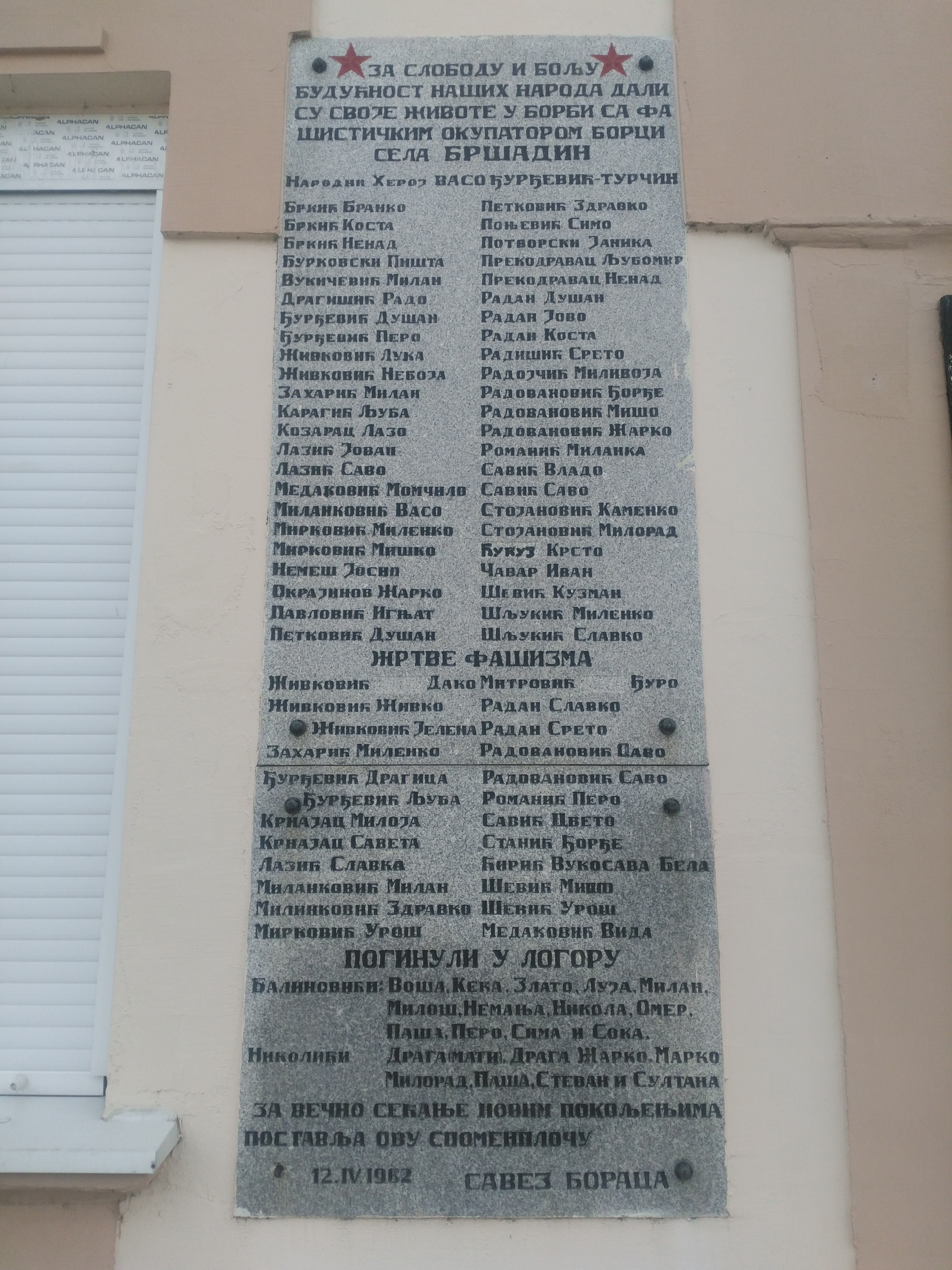
Serbian Cyrillic inscription on 1962 World War II memorial in the centre of the village.

Serbian Language and Serbian Cyrillic alphabet is the second official language in most of the villages of the Municipality of Trpinja (except Ćelije) alongside the Croatian language which is official at the national level. Both Serbian and Croatian language are standardized varieties of the pluricentric Serbo-Croatian language. According to the Municipal Statute, individuals who are members of the Serbian national minority are ensured the freedom of expression of national belonging and freedom to use their language and script in public and private use on the whole territory of the Municipality including the village of Bršadin. The statute guarantees that the Serbian Cyrillic alphabet will be used in the same font size as the Latin alphabet in the text of the local seals and stamps, on official plates of public representatives, executive and administrative bodies, as well as on those of legal persons with public authorities.

According to the municipal Statute, bilingual signs of the same font are used for written traffic signs and other written traffic markings, street and squares names and names of settlement and geographical localities on the entire territory of the Municipality. Equal public use of Serbian language is required on the basis of the Constitutional Act on the Rights of National Minorities in the Republic of Croatia and relevant national laws and the country is a party to the European Charter for Regional or Minority Languages.

== Sport ==
There is a local amateur football club NK Bršadin.

== See also ==
- Trpinja municipality
- Joint Council of Municipalities

== Sources ==
- Barišić Bogišić, Lidija (2022). O neslavenskom stanovništvu na vukovarskom području. Hrvatska sveučilišna naklada. ISBN 978-953-169-497-1.
