= Bobota, Croatia =

Bobota Бобота (Serbian)
- Village (Selo)
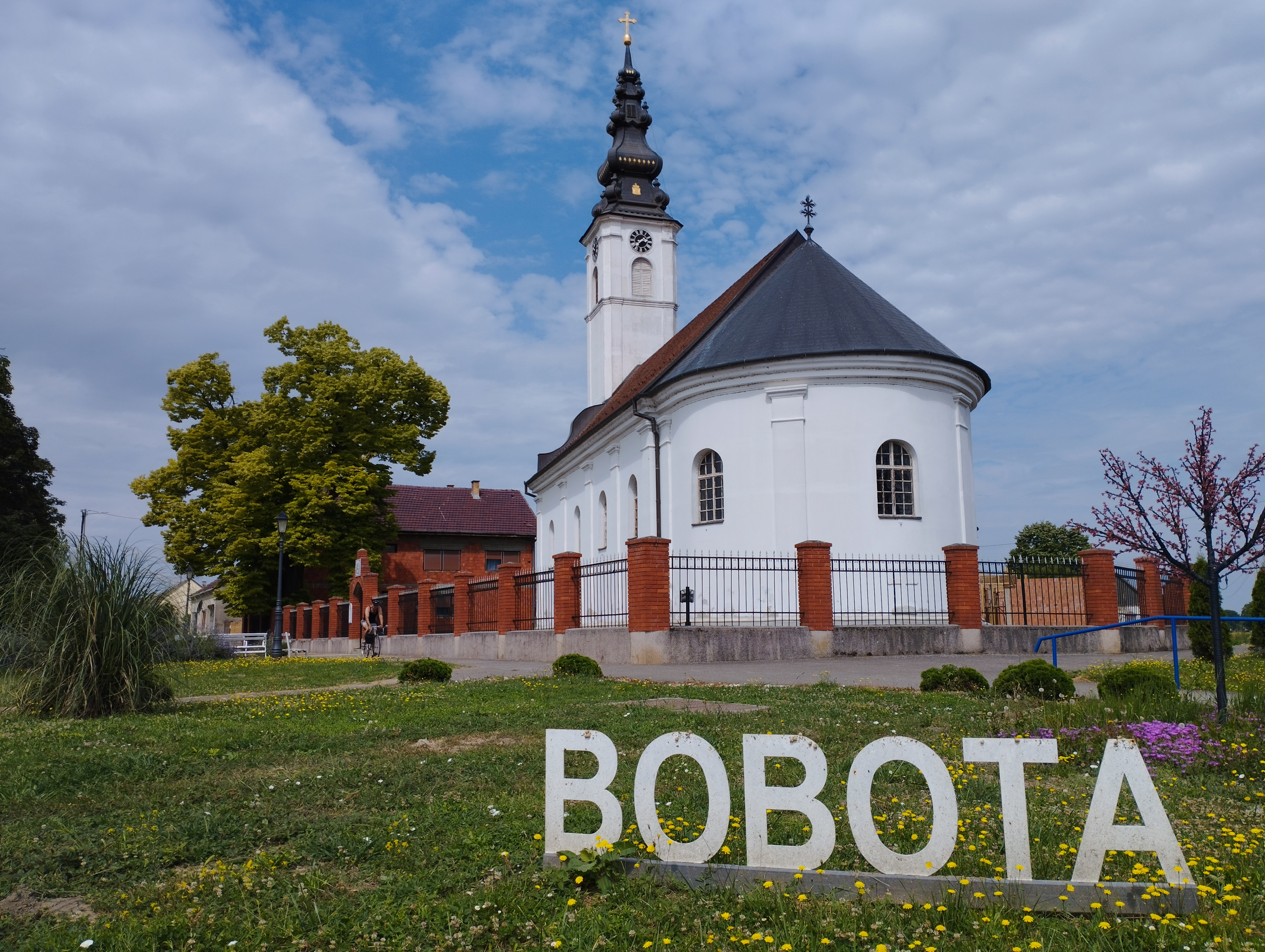
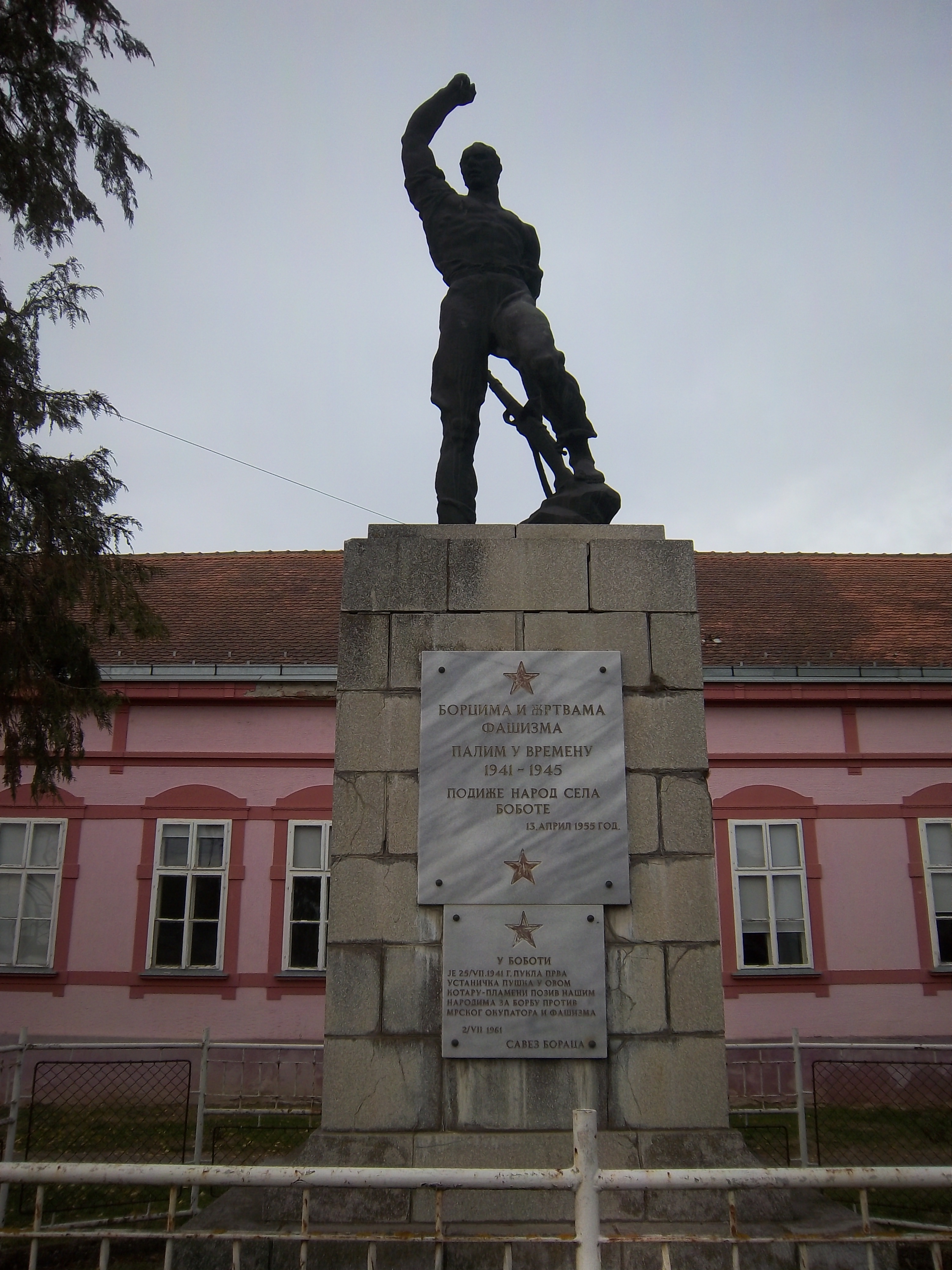
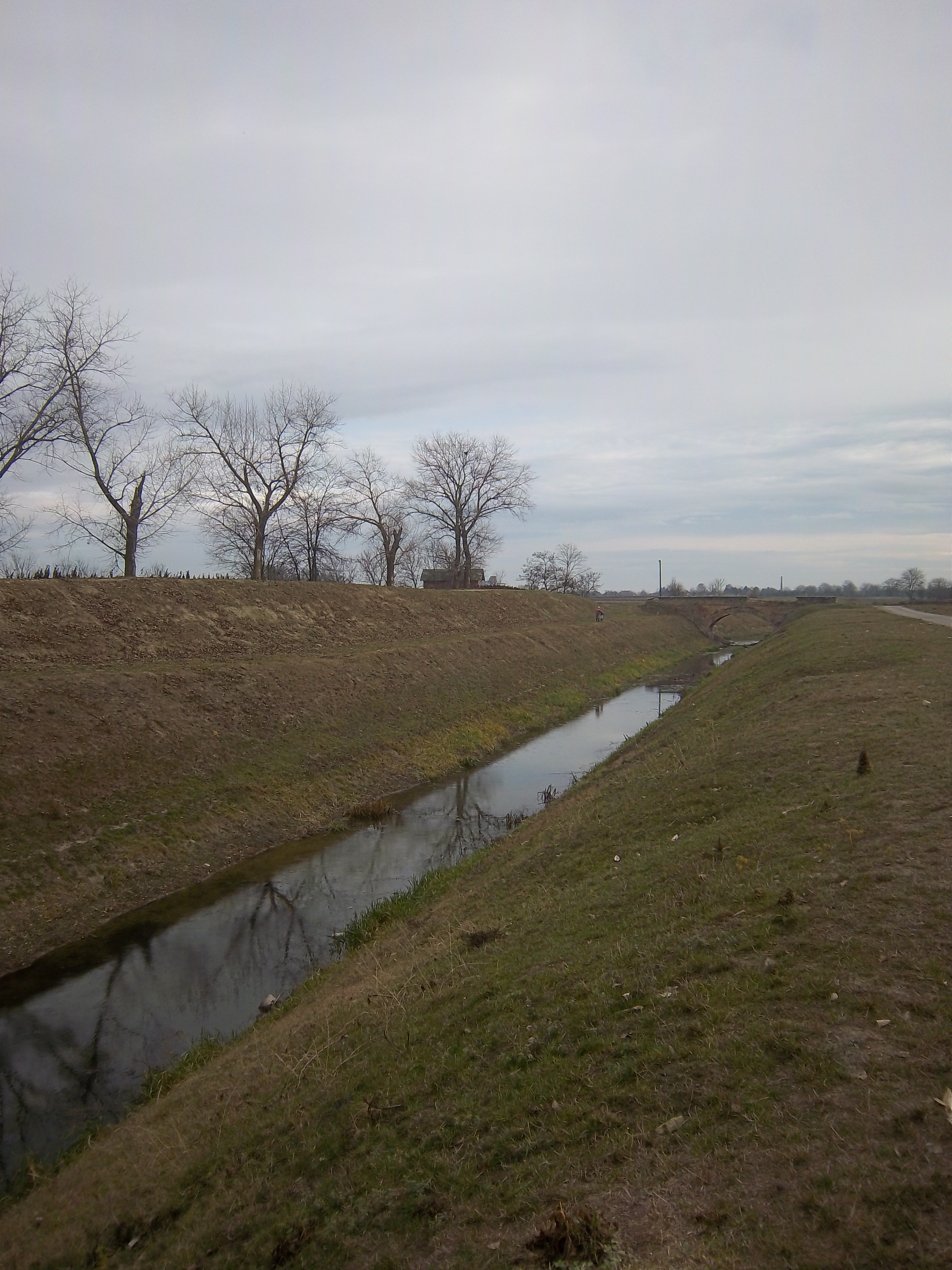
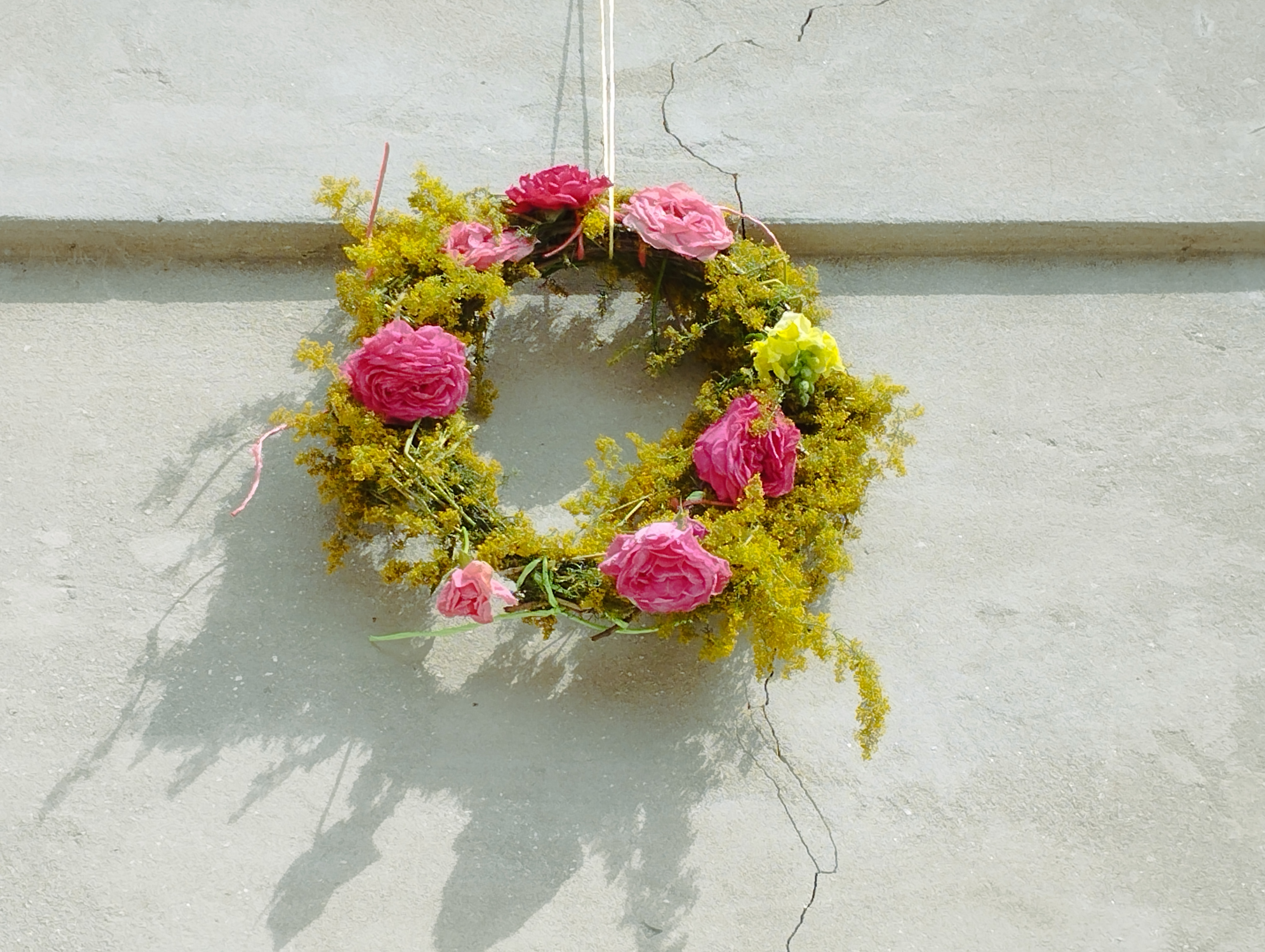
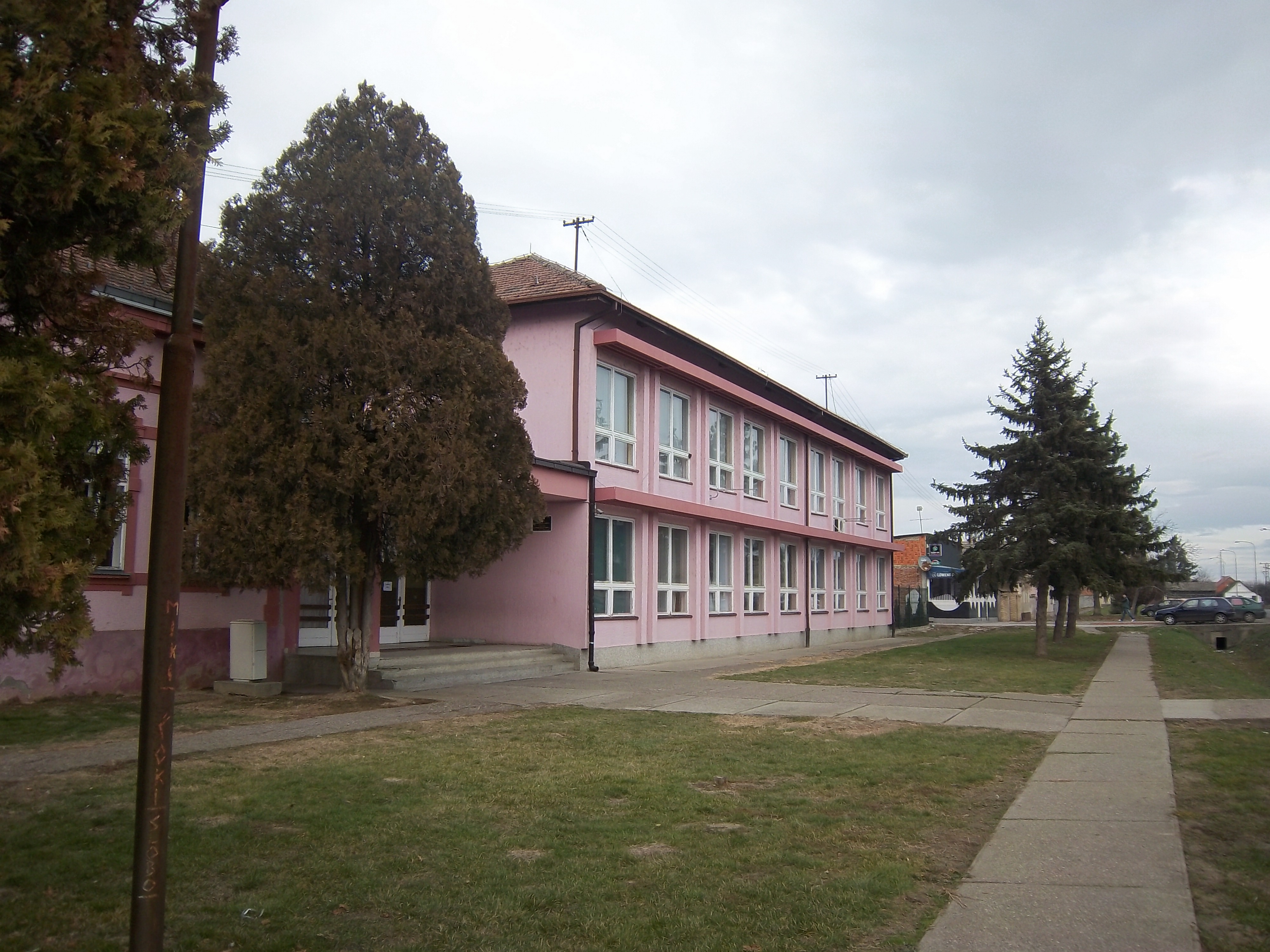
- Church of St. George World War II memorial Bobota Canal Galium verum Midsummer wreath Elementary School

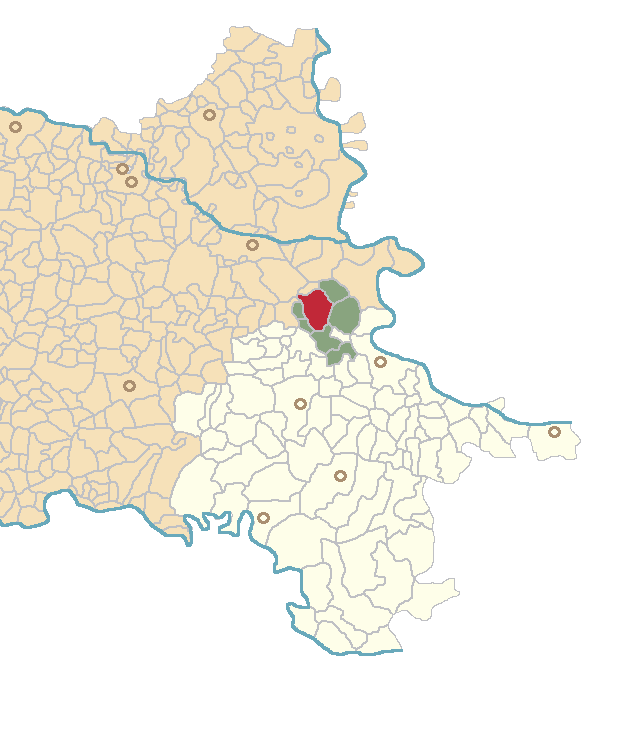

- Location within Vukovar-Syrmia County Location within Croatia Location within Europe
- Coordinates: 45.395934°N 18.855382°E
- Country: Croatia
- Region: Slavonia (Podunavlje)
- County: Vukovar-Syrmia
- Municipality: Trpinja

Government
  - Body: Local Committee

Area
  - Total: 34.6 km^{2} (13.4 sq mi)

Population (2021)
  - Total: 1,202
  - Density: 34.7/km^{2} (90.0/sq mi)
- Demonym(s): Boboćanin (♂) Boboćanka (♀) (per grammatical gender)
- Time zone: UTC+1 (CET)
  - Summer (DST): UTC+2 (CEST)
- Postal code: 32 225 Bobota
- Vehicle registration: VU
- Official languages: Croatian, Serbian

Bobota (Serbian Cyrillic: Бобота) is a village in the municipality of Trpinja in Vukovar-Syrmia County in eastern Croatia. Regional Bobota Canal, the first major water management project in modern-day Croatia in the post-Roman Empire period, was named after the village.

According to 2011 Census Bobota, had a population of 1,491 inhabitants. Bobota is centrally located within the municipality and is its largest settlement with its total population just marginally ahead of Trpinja. The village is located south of the D2 road and part of the Osijek Airport plot, including a part of the runway, is within its cadastral boundaries. The village is also located centrally in the triangle of the nearby cities of Osijek, Vukovar and Vinkovci.

== Name ==
Villages of Trpinja, Bobota and Vera share the common folk story on the origin of their names. According to the story, the ancestors of today's inhabitants of villages, who settled at the time of the Great Serb Migrations under Arsenije III Čarnojević, were called Bobe. They fled from the Ottoman Empire conquests of Balkan in their effort to preserve their religious freedom.

This legendary religious commitment to Eastern Orthodoxy was coined in the local phrase of Bobe endured for the faith or originally in Serbian Bobe trpiše za veru. The family name of 'Bobe' was used as the basis for the name of Bobota, the word 'endured' (Serbo-Croatian: trpiti) for the name of Trpinja and from the word for faith (Serbian: vera) the name of Vera was created.

== Geography ==
Bobota, just slightly ahead of Trpinja, is the largest settlement in the municipality. Bobota is surrounded by Pačetin to the south, Ćelije to the west, Vera to the north and Trpinja, Lipovača and Bršadin to the east. Fertile intensive agricultural land and lowland forests are the main characteristics of the landscape. The Bobota Canal passes just north of the village separating a small part of it from the rest of the village.

== History ==
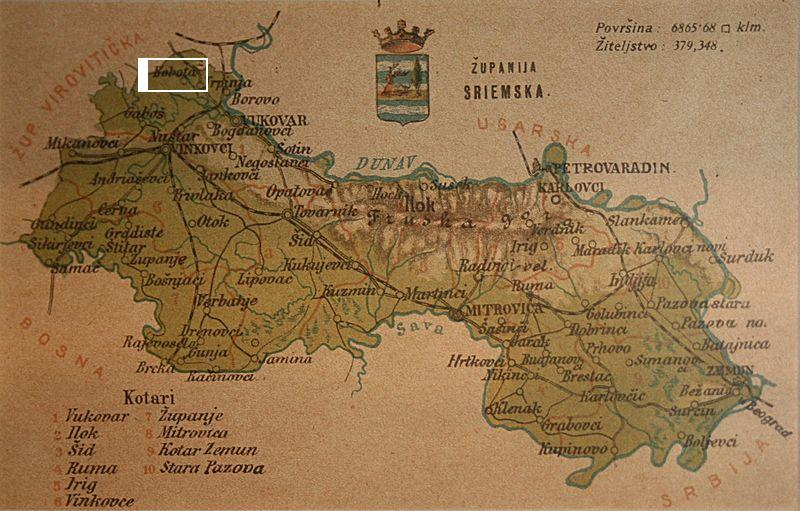
Village on map from 1900

The earliest recorded human settlement in the area of Bobota dates back to classical antiquity with the northeast archeologically site of Staro Ljeskovo containing IV century Roman bricks marked with "I H" inscription. Those bricks indicate the presence of the Legio VI Herculia's station in the area at that time. Other types of artefacts were discovered at the same location including Roman glazed ceramics, terra sigillata, glass and oil lamps with reliefs and a stone altar with the inscription of the tribune "Titus Flavius Marcianus" and with recognized potential for further archaeological excavations.

According to primary written sources medieval village of Bobota existed under the name "Bobuta" as early as 1269 with medieval settlement being located slightly to the northwest on the left bank of the Vuka river, in a place called Stara Bobota. In 1366 "Babacha" was mentioned in a report to King Louis I of Hungary. During the Ottoman–Hungarian wars the village was conquered in 1526 after the fall of Vukovar but it remained inhabited in 1558. The village was liberated from the Ottoman rule in 1687 remaining uninhabited for the following ten years. The first 14 Serb families subsequently settled in the abandoned village building their homes close to the old village. Following Ottoman retreat from the region, the Lordship of Vukovar was established, and the village became part of its domain in 1725. In following years Serb settlement continued with families arriving from Bačka, Mačva, Montenegro and Baranya so that in 1736 there was already 82 households. The oldest book about Bobota was published in 1750. Jewish family Wellisch (Velić) moved from Vukovar to Bobota in 1850s where they initiated their trade business with Leopold Wellisch (Lavoslav Velić) being born in the village in 1861 and died in Vienna in 1914.

From 27 December 1920 (when they arrived in Vukovar) soldiers and families of the White Russian émigrés who were followers of Pyotr Wrangel settled in Bobota, Pačetin, Trpinja and Vera.

Bobota was the first village in Vukovar region where Yugoslav Partisans resistance was organized during the World War II in Yugoslavia. In the Vukovar area, Ustaša authorities did not immediately launch large-scale killings against Serb communities in the first mass killing phase from April to May 1941 which targeted area that lacked significant economic value. Wealthier regions such as Vukovar saw a more restrained approach, as peace and order were crucial for the continuity of industry and agriculture. Mass shootings in town began in late July 1941 after the first act of resistance in Bobota. The following day, the Ustaša forces encircled the village, interrogated and terrorized the inhabitants, and arrested 45 people. Thirty of them were sent to the Jadovno concentration camp, while 15 were sentenced to death by a hastily convened traveling summary court and execution being carried at the Dudik site. Over 500 people will be executed at the site during the war with the place being turned into the Dudik Memorial Park subsequently. On 26 August 1941 local Ustaše representative was attacked under the leadership of Đoko Patković. Represion led to further resistance and imprisonment of 500 residents of Bobota, Trpinja and Vera in September of 1941. 96 residents of Bobota lost they lives during the World War II resulting in post-war reputation of the village as a regional stronghold of the resistance movement. In the first years following the World War II in Yugoslavia and before 1948 Tito–Stalin split the new Yugoslavia implemented a number of policies copied from the Soviet Union including some aspects of collectivization in the Soviet Union. Rural resistance to this policy led to an incident in Bobota in 1945 when an anonymous humorous graffiti appeared in the village subsequently described by new authorities as an "enemy act by kulak elements". The inscription, which rhyme in original language, stated "Kralju Petre, dođi nam do žetve, jer nam Tito odnese sve žito" or in English "King Peter, come before our harvest, because Tito took away all of our grain". During the existence of the SFR Yugoslavia Bobota, nevertheless, gained reputation of comparatively prosperous village.

On 22 July 1990 an All Serb Political Rally for Eastern Slavonia and Syrmia, event at which Jovan Rašković spoke, was held in Bobota leading to the establishment of the Serb Democratic Party (SDS) in the region where it was not active at the time of 1990 Croatian parliamentary election. After the local branch of the Communist Party collectively joined the SDS, in October of 1990 300th anniversary of the Great Migrations of the Serbs was marked in the village with Matija Bećković attending the event.

In late November 2021 Croatian media reported that investigators discovered human remains of at least ten victims from the Croatian War of Independence at the site of an illegal landfill located next to the forest close to the main road to Pačetin.

== Population ==
Historical population 1857-2001
v

| population | 1921 | 2083 | 1945 | 2211 | 2140 | 2194 | 2198 | 2324 | 1852 | 1855 | 1940 | 1959 | 1926 | 1881 | 1651 |
| | 1857 | 1869 | 1880 | 1890 | 1900 | 1910 | 1921 | 1931 | 1948 | 1953 | 1961 | 1971 | 1981 | 1991 | 2001 |

Sources: Croatian Bureau of Statistics publications

Serbs of Croatia constitute absolute majority of the local population.

=== Languages ===
==== Serbian language ====
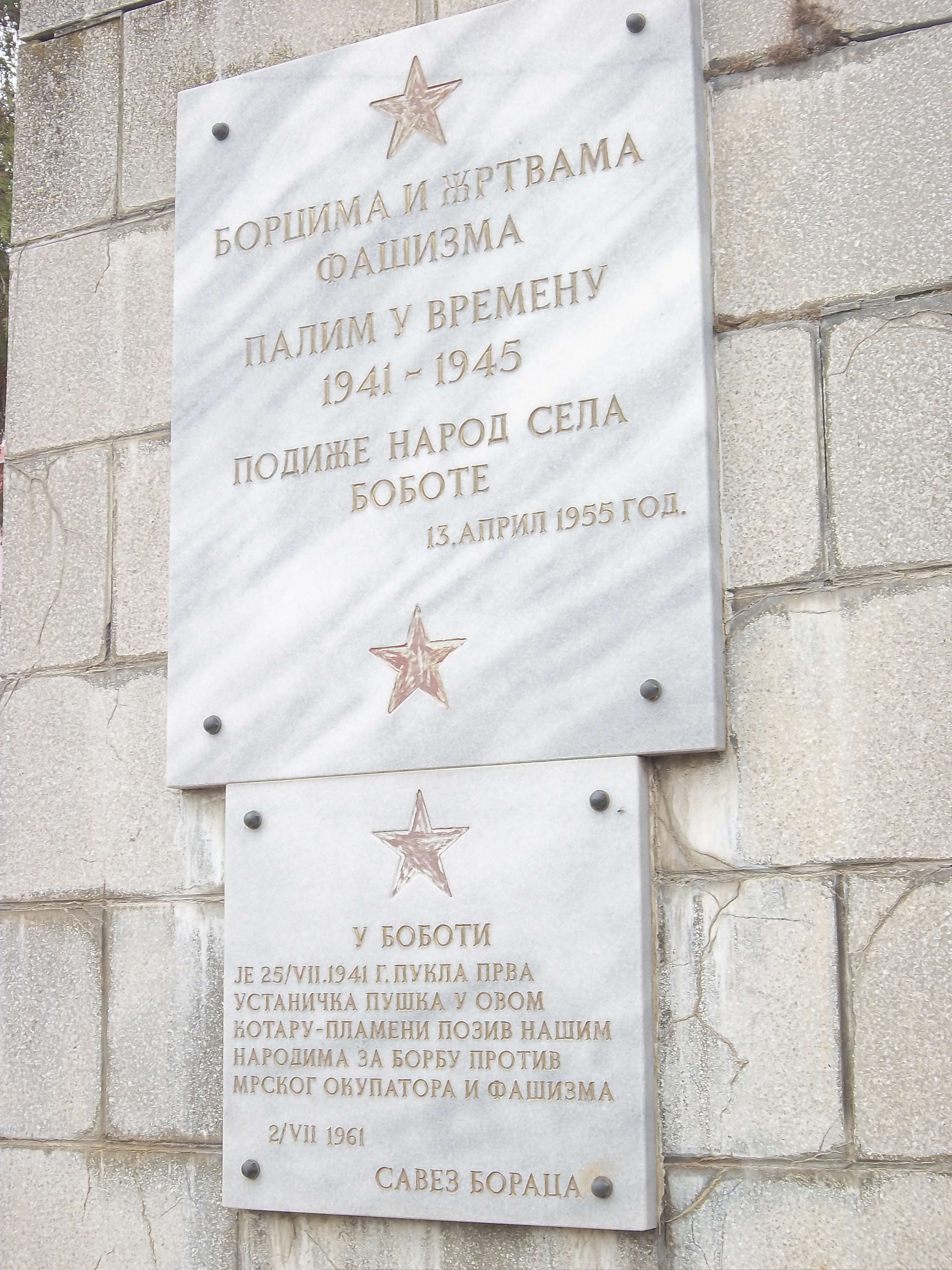
Serbian Cyrillic inscription on 1955 and 1961 World War II memorials in the centre of the village.

Serbian Language and Serbian Cyrillic alphabet is the second official language in most of the villages of the Municipality of Trpinja (except Ćelije) alongside the Croatian language which is official at the national level. Both Serbian and Croatian language are standardized varieties of the pluricentric Serbo-Croatian language. According to the Municipal Statute, individuals who are members of the Serbian national minority are ensured the freedom of expression of national belonging and freedom to use their language and script in public and private use on the whole territory of the Municipality including the village of Bobota. The statute guarantees that the Serbian Cyrillic alphabet will be used in the same font size as the Latin alphabet in the text of the local seals and stamps, on official plates of public representatives, executive and administrative bodies, as well as on those of legal persons with public authorities.

According to the municipal Statute, bilingual signs of the same font are used for written traffic signs and other written traffic markings, street and squares names and names of settlement and geographical localities on the entire territory of the Municipality. Equal public use of Serbian language is required on the basis of the Constitutional Act on the Rights of National Minorities in the Republic of Croatia and relevant national laws and the country is a party to the European Charter for Regional or Minority Languages.

== Economy ==
Agriculture is important source of economic revenue.

== Education ==
=== Kindergarten Liliput ===
Local Liliput Kindergarten was formally registered on 29 March 1999. Its central facilities are located in Bobota, with additional two branches in Bršadin and Trpinja. Kindergarten is named after fictional island nation of Lilliput from the Gulliver's Travels book written by the Anglo-Irish writer and clergyman Jonathan Swift. Since the institution operate in villages where Serbs of Croatia constitute majority, it offers its program in Serbian with additional mandatory learning of Croatian.

=== Primary school ===
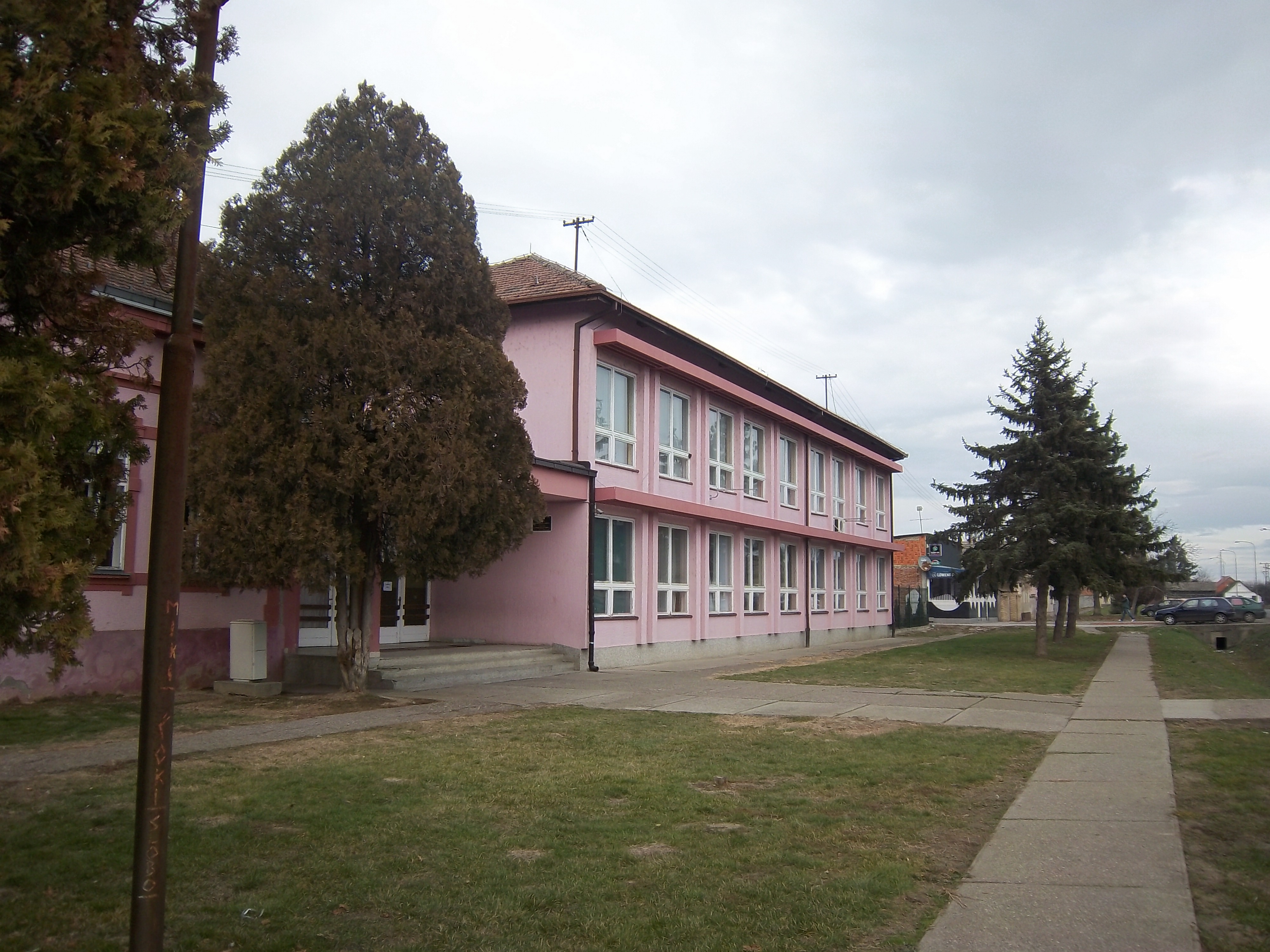
Old school building

Local public Primary School in Bobota provides education up to eighth grade. Institution offer classes in Serbian and Cyrillic. School also operate four branch schools in Pačetin, Vera, Klisa, and Ludvinci. Those branch schools offer classes for pupils up to the fourth grade while higher grades student attend classes in Bobota. The school building in Bobota consists of two parts, one of which was built in 1928 and the other in 1975. During the school year 2006/2007 new sports hall was built. The school building has 8 classrooms, 7 specialized cabinets, two offices, library, staff room, toilets and central heating. Furniture and educational equipment do not meet all standards due to deterioration and the lack of teaching resources. School Library has in its possession approximately 5,000 items (books, CD-s, magazines).

== Associations and Institutions ==
Volunteer Fire Department Bobota is one of association active in the village.

== Sport ==
The village has a local football team called Borac.

== Gallery ==
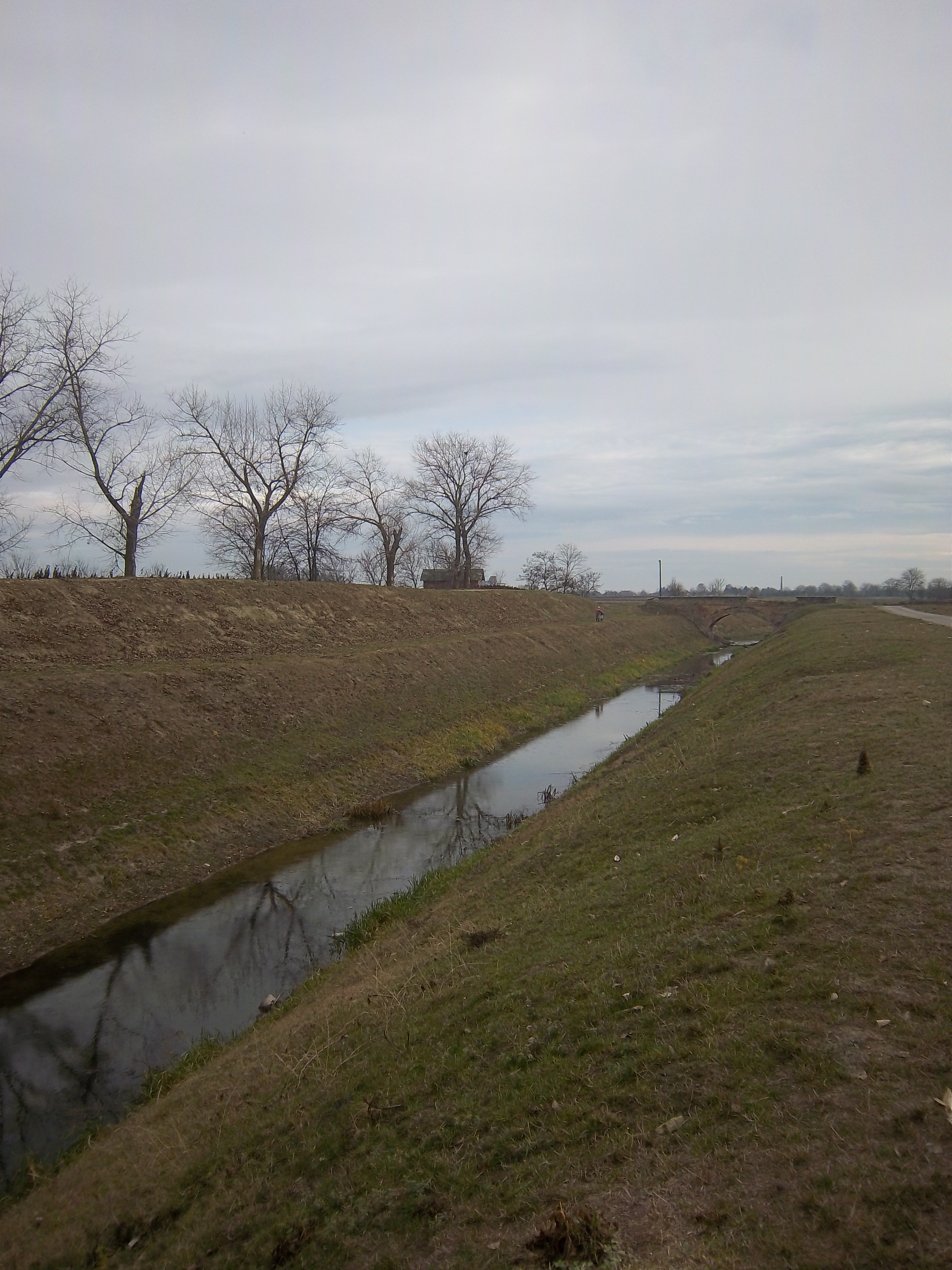
Bobota Canal

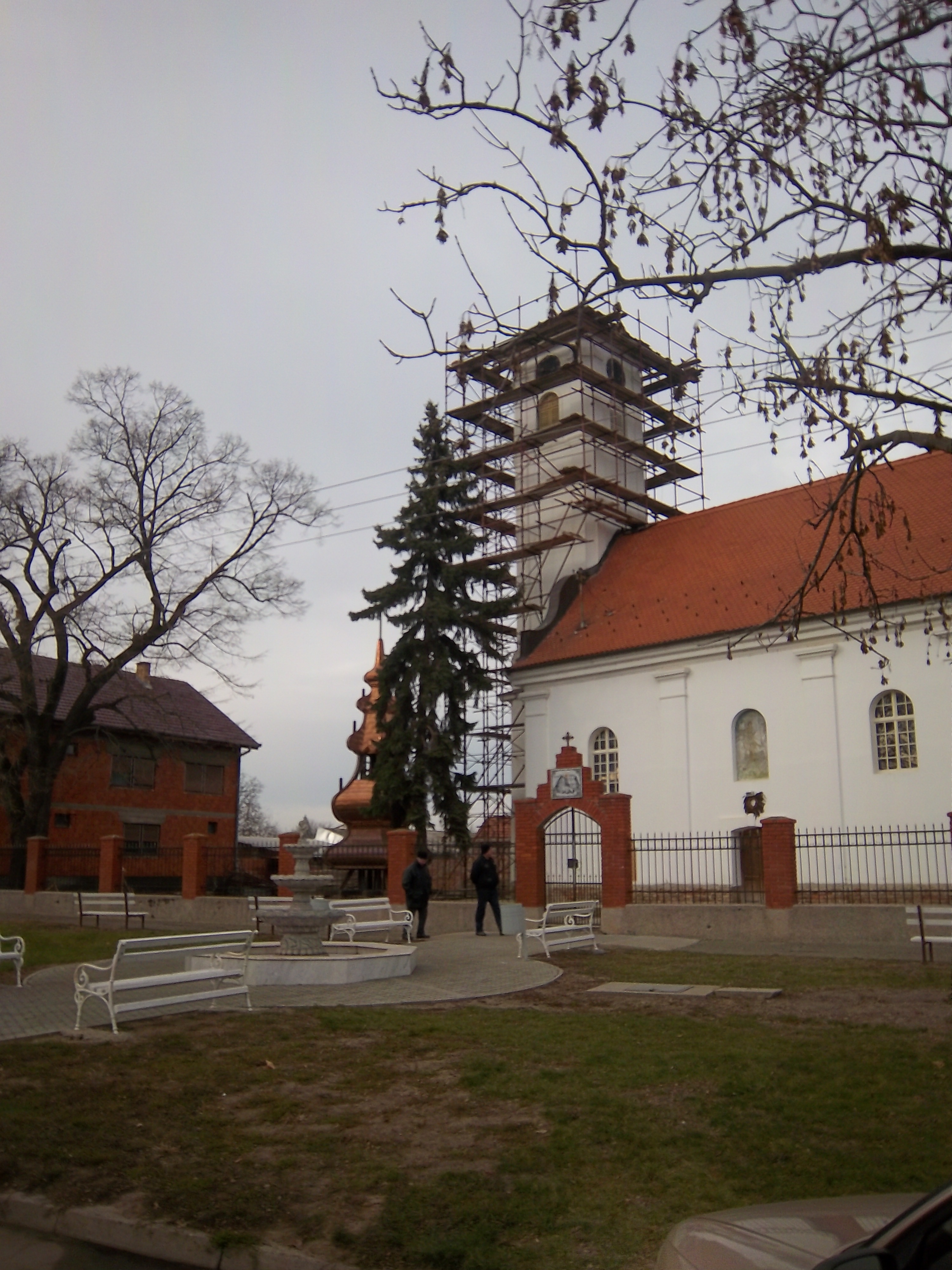

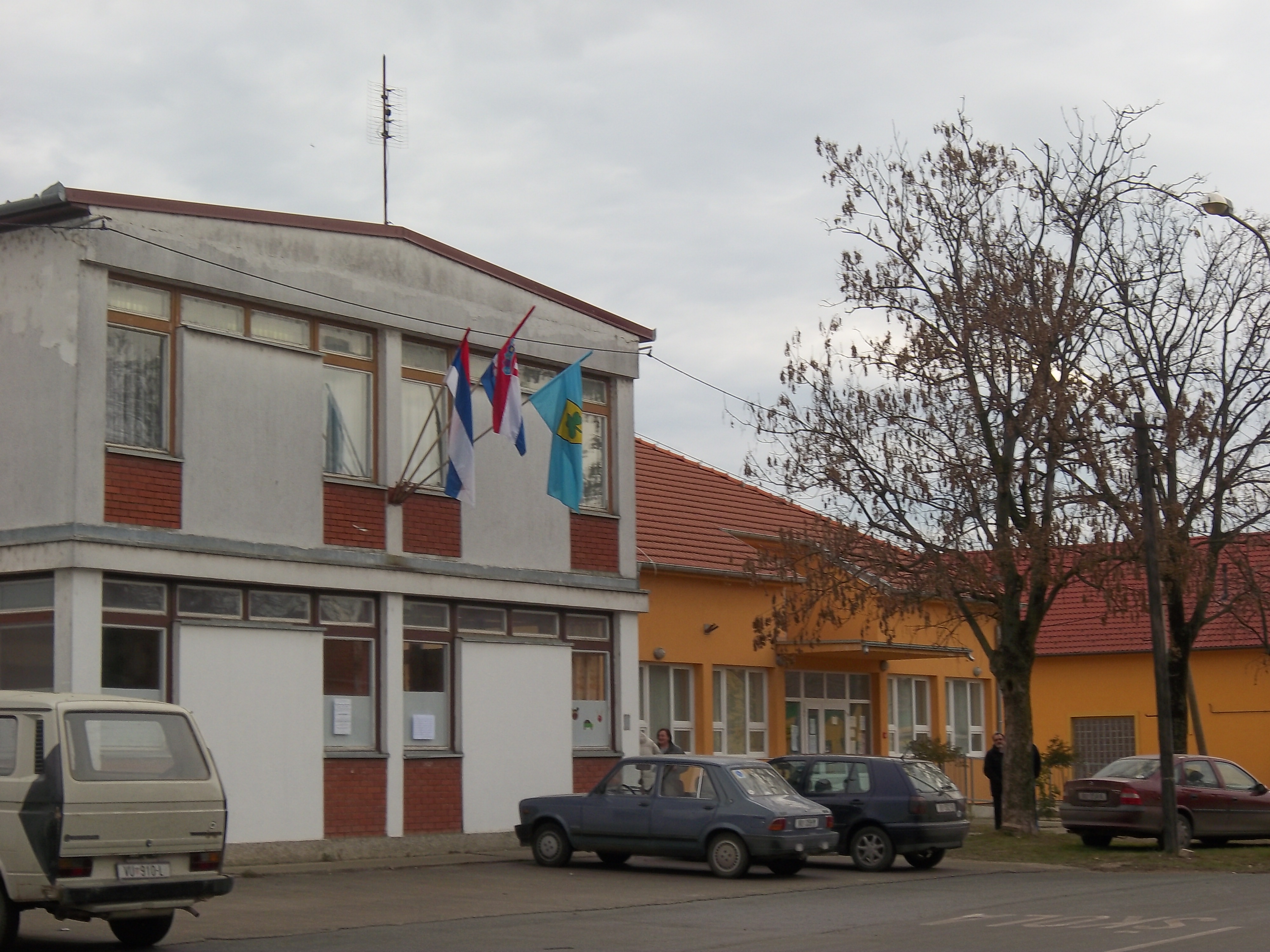

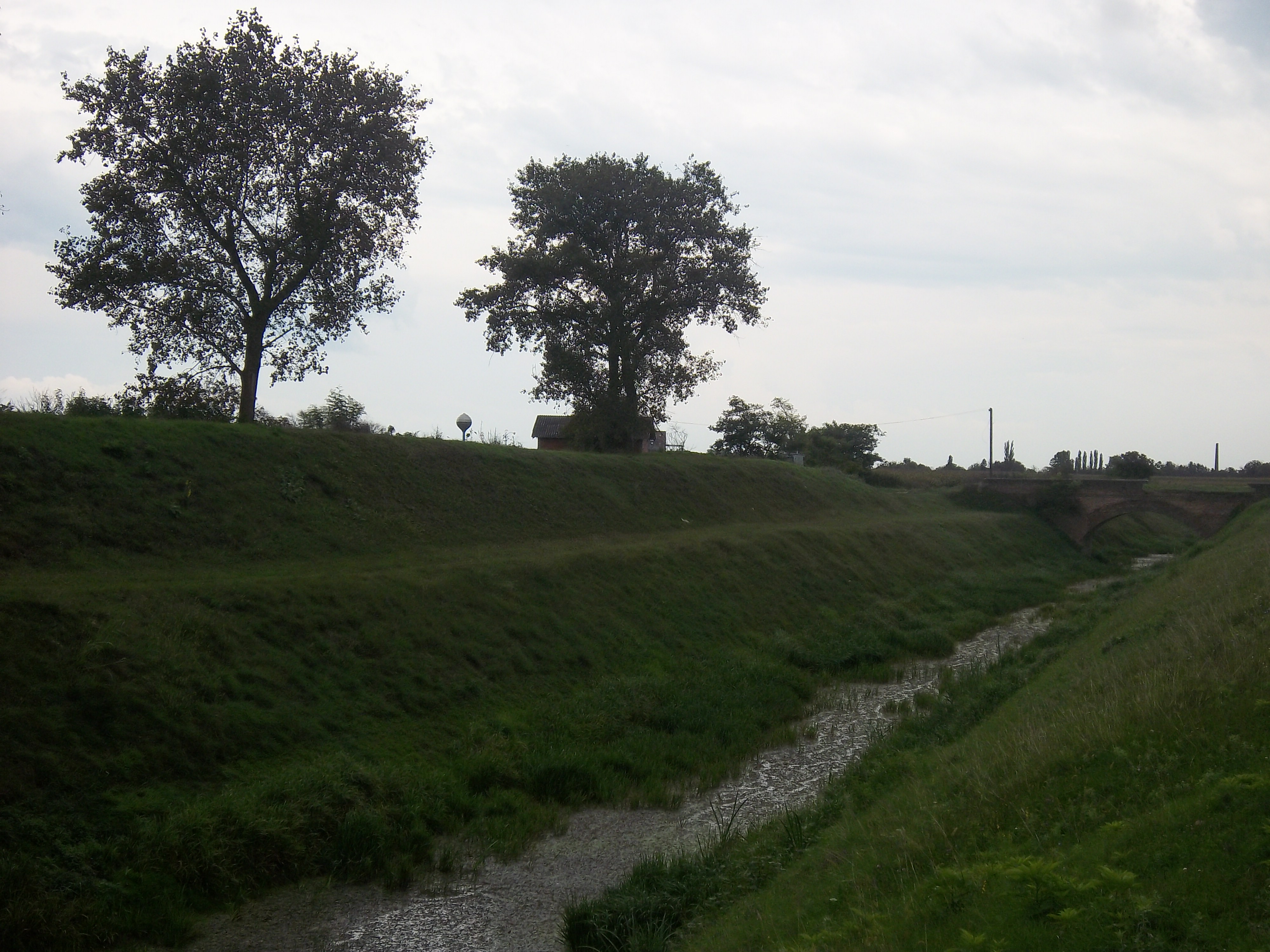
Bobota Canal

== See also ==
- Bobota Canal
- Trpinja municipality
- Church of St. George, Bobota
- Joint Council of Municipalities
