= Vera, Croatia =

Vera Вера (Serbian)
- Village (Selo)
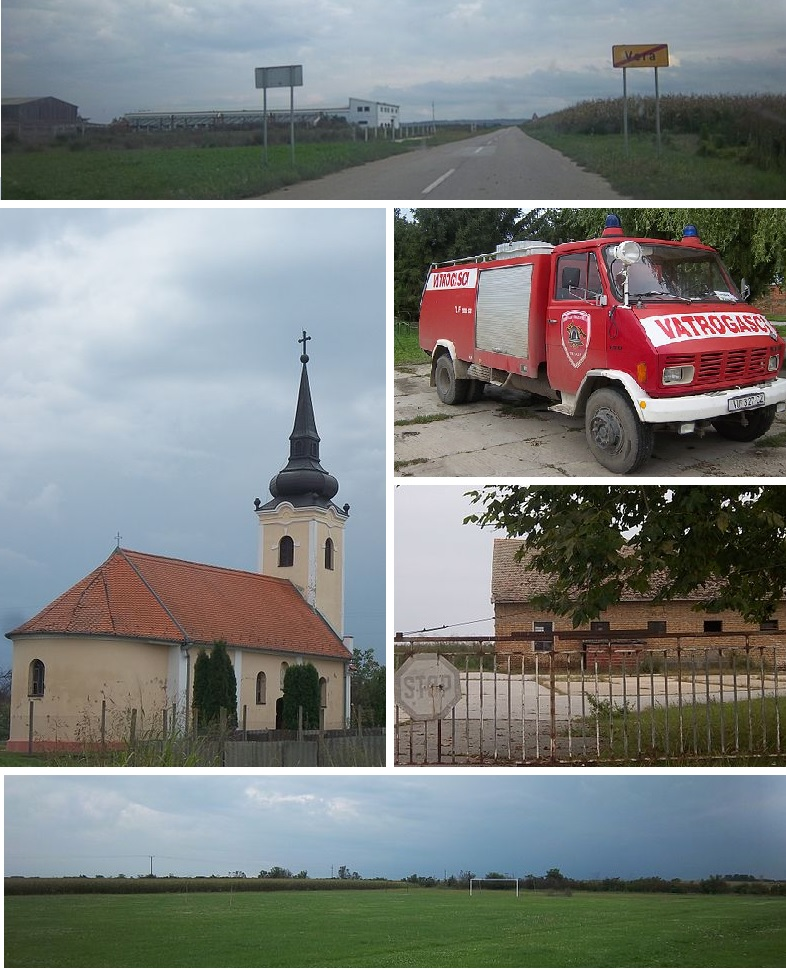

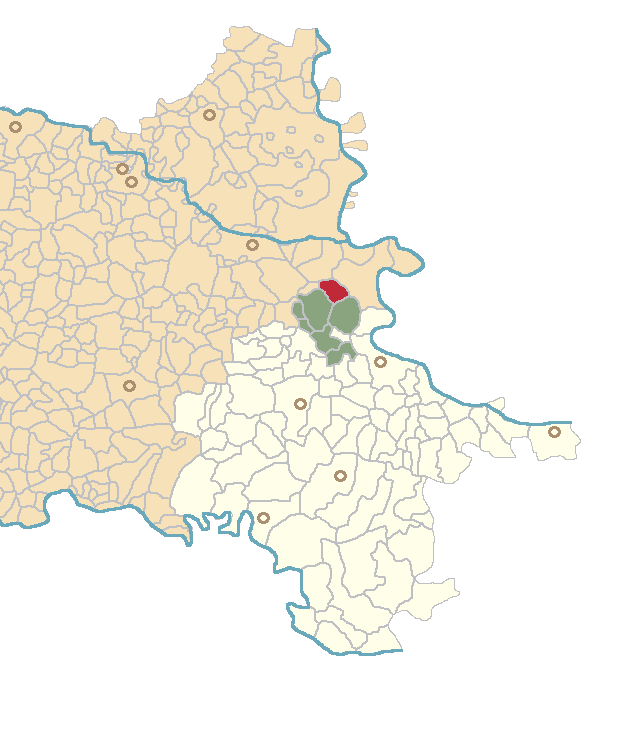
- Location of Vera in Croatia

- Location within Vukovar-Syrmia County Location within Croatia Location within Europe
- Coordinates: 45°25′N 18°54′E
- Country: Croatia
- Region: Slavonia (Podunavlje)
- County: Vukovar-Syrmia
- Municipality: Trpinja

Government
  - Body: Local Committee

Area
  - Total: 16.5 km^{2} (6.4 sq mi)

Population (2021)
  - Total: 346
  - Density: 21.0/km^{2} (54.3/sq mi)
- Demonym(s): Veranin (♂) Veranka (♀) (per grammatical gender)
- Time zone: UTC+1 (CET)
  - Summer (DST): UTC+2 (CEST)
- Postal code: 32 225
- Area code: +385 (0)32
- Vehicle registration: VU
- Official languages: Croatian, Serbian

Vera (Serbian Cyrillic: Вера) is a village in Trpinja Municipality in eastern Croatia. The village is the northernmost settlement of the Vukovar-Syrmia County.

== Name ==
The villages of Trpinja, Bobota and Vera share a common legend about the origin of their names. According to the legend, the ancestors of today's inhabitants of villages, who settled at the time of the Great Serb Migrations under Arsenije III Čarnojević, were called Bobe. They were fleeing from the Ottoman Empire conquests of Balkan as they wanted to preserve their religious freedom.

This legendary religious commitment and orthodoxy was coined in the local phrase Bobe endured for the faith or originally in Serbian Bobe trpiše za veru. The family name of 'Bobe' was used as the basis for the name of Bobota, the word 'endured' (Serbian: trpiti) the name of Trpinja was created and from the word of faith (Serbian: vera) the name of Vera was coined.

== Geography ==
Area of Vera and neighboring Trpinja and Bobota have the lowest elevation among the villages north of the Vuka River within their country.

== History ==
The first written mention of the village of "Were" comes from 1400 with subsequent references in 1443, 1460 and 1482. The settlement was conquered by the Ottoman Empire in 1526 after the fall of Vukovar and it was liberated in 1687 after more than 150 years of Ottoman rule.

Following Ottoman retreat from the region, the Lordship of Vukovar was established, and the village became part of its domain in 1725. The village was initially owned by the Kuffstein family, then from 1736 by the Eltz family who will build their Eltz Manor in Vukovar as a center of the estate. The village appeared under the name of Vera in János Lipszky's Repertorium published in Buda in 1808. Lajos Nagy's work published in 1829 states that there was 90 houses, with 22 Roman Catholic and 698 Eastern Orthodox inhabitants in the village.

Up until the mid-19th century area of Vera was a part of much larger Palača Swamplands. After the completion of Bobota Canal surrounding areas were transformed into agricultural lands. From 27 December 1920 (when they arrived in Vukovar) soldiers and families of the White Russian émigrés who were followers of Pyotr Wrangel settled in Bobota, Pačetin, Bršadin, Trpinja and Vera.

== Languages ==
=== Serbian language ===
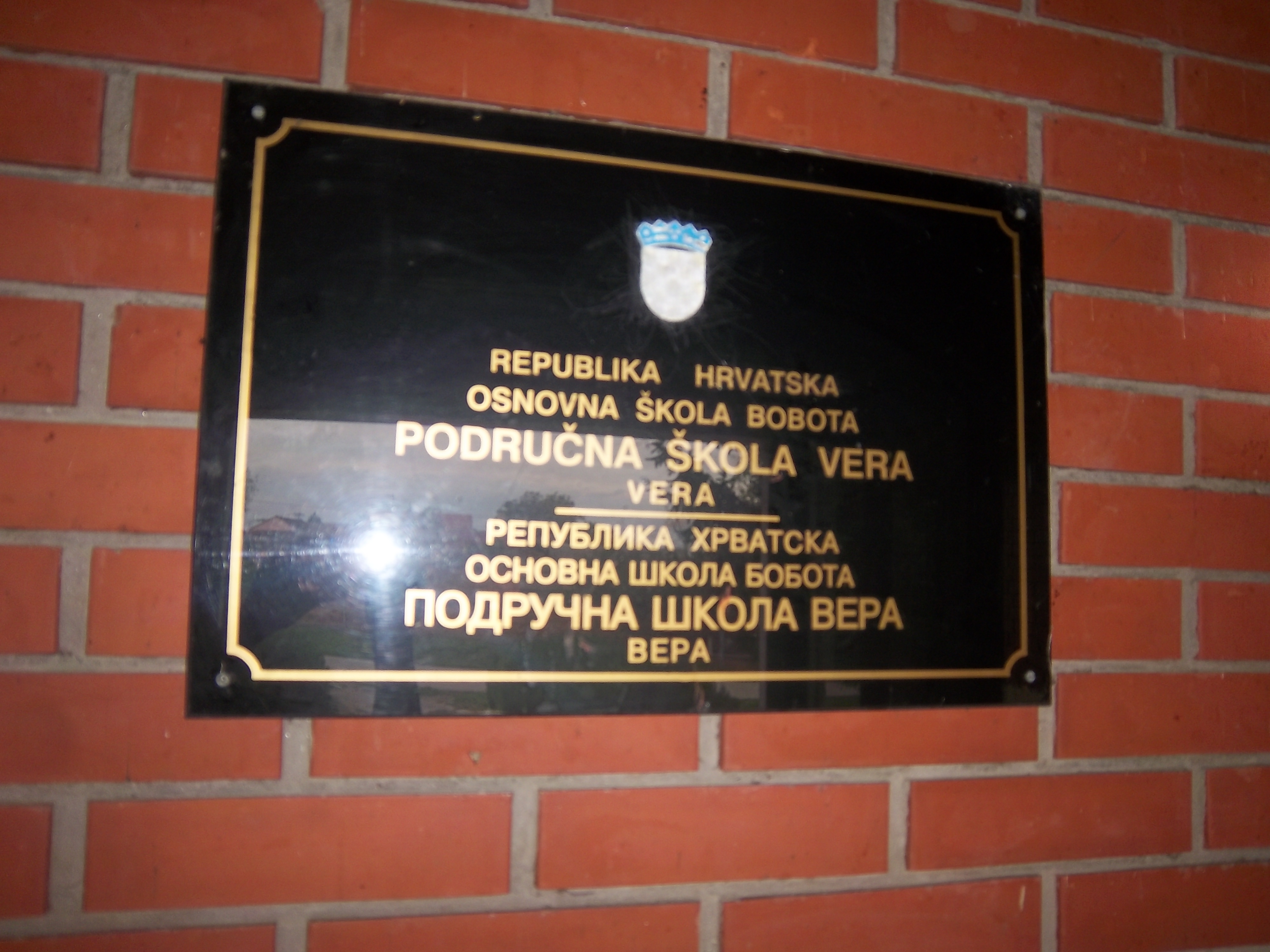
Bilingual inscription at the local elementary school.

Serbian Language and Serbian Cyrillic alphabet is the second official language in most of the villages of the Municipality of Trpinja (except Ćelije) alongside the Croatian language which is official at the national level. Both Serbian and Croatian language are standardized varieties of the pluricentric Serbo-Croatian language. According to the Municipal Statute, individuals who are members of the Serbian national minority are ensured the freedom of expression of national belonging and freedom to use their language and script in public and private use on the whole territory of the Municipality including the village of Vera. The statute guarantees that the Serbian Cyrillic alphabet will be used in the same font size as the Latin alphabet in the text of the local seals and stamps, on official plates of public representatives, executive and administrative bodies, as well as on those of legal persons with public authorities.

According to the municipal Statute, bilingual signs of the same font are used for written traffic signs and other written traffic markings, street and squares names and names of settlement and geographical localities on the entire territory of the Municipality. Equal public use of Serbian language is required on the basis of the Constitutional Act on the Rights of National Minorities in the Republic of Croatia and relevant national laws and the country is a party to the European Charter for Regional or Minority Languages.

== Education ==
Branch school of the Elementary School Bobota is located in Vera. Education at the local schools is carried out in Serbian similarly to many other schools in eastern Croatia since the days of peaceful reintegration of the region completed in 1998. The first school in Vera was opened in 1789.

== Sports ==
- NK Hajduk Vera, football club

== Gallery ==
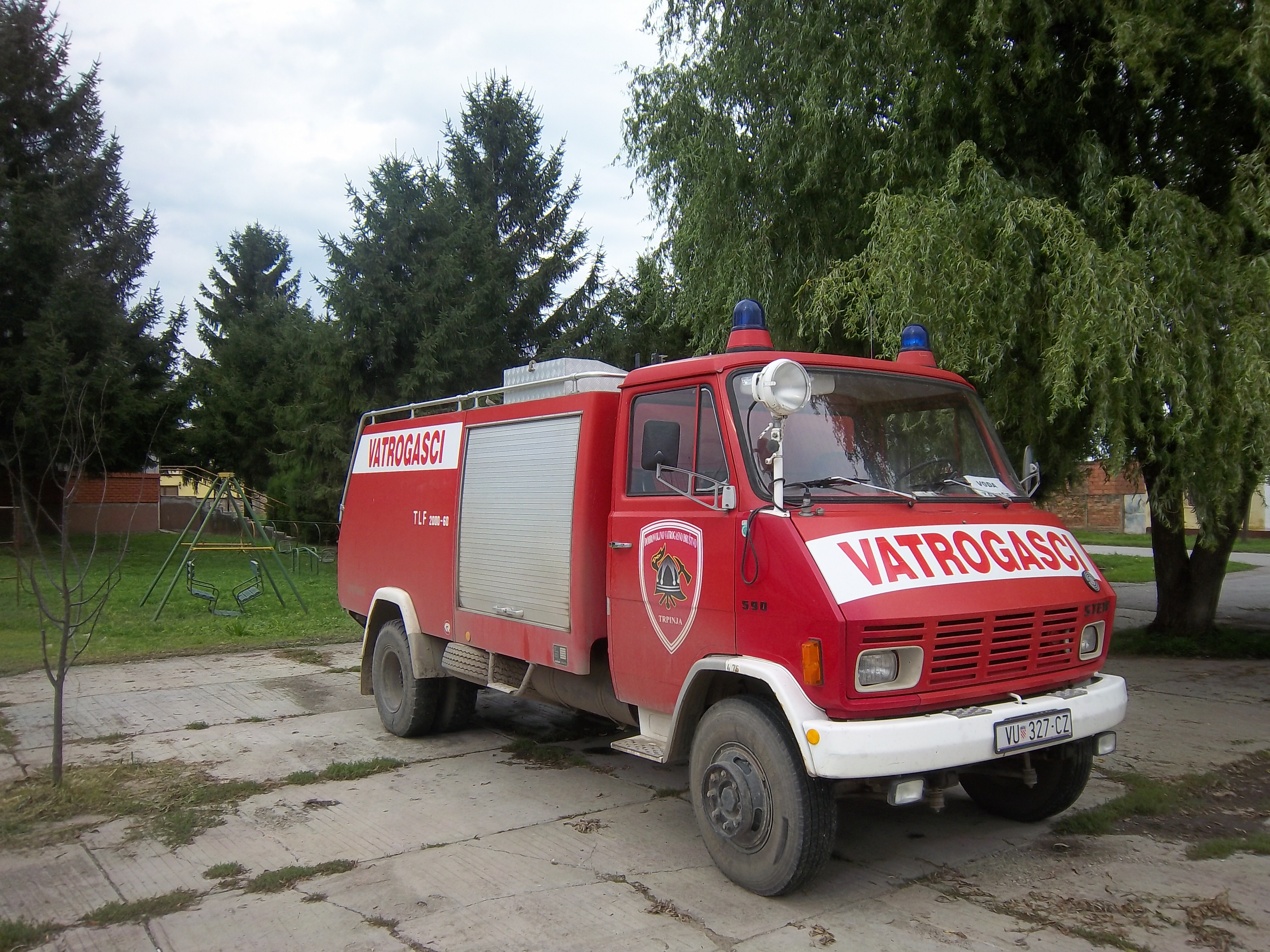

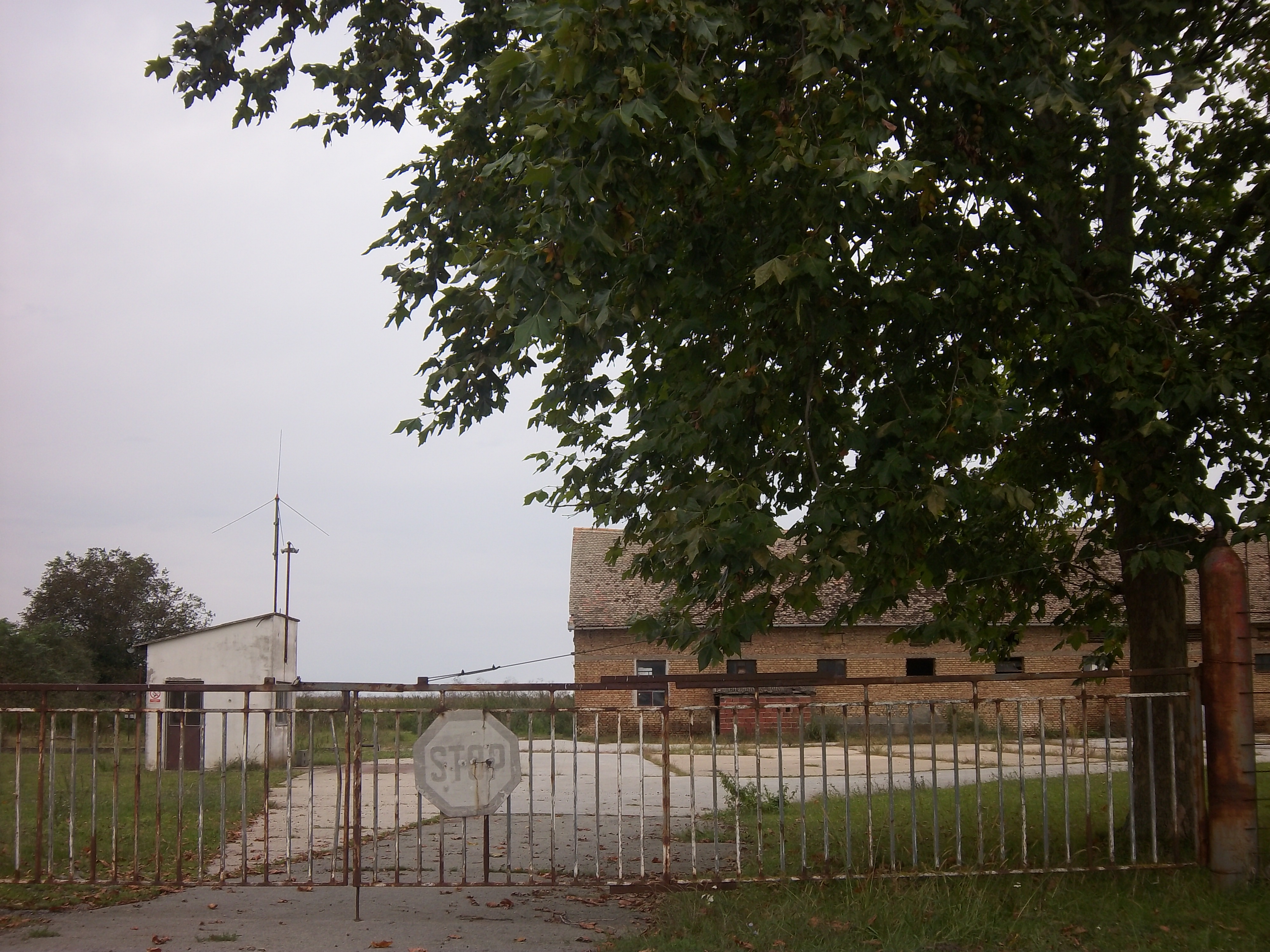

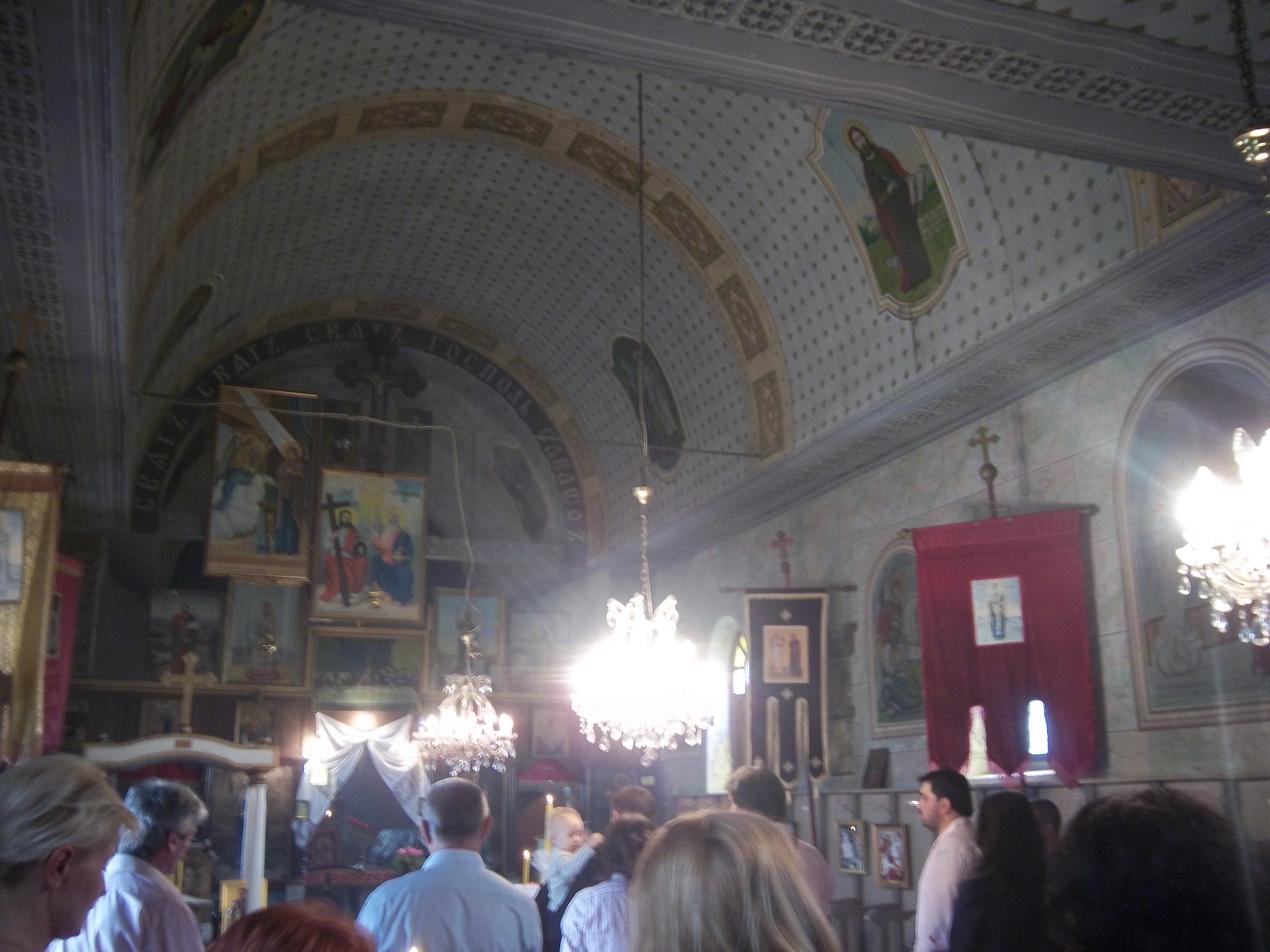

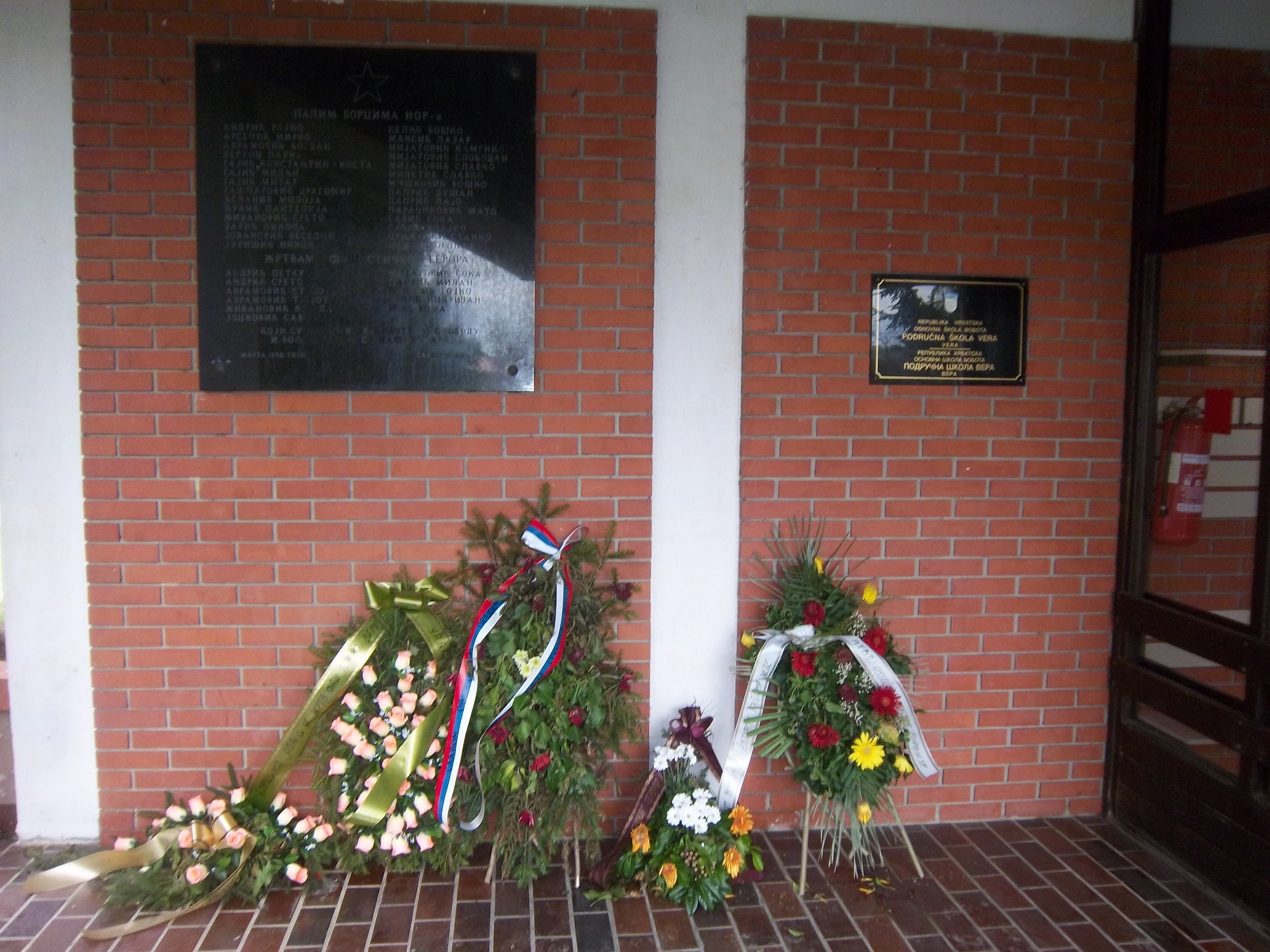

== See also ==
- Trpinja municipality

== Sources ==
- Barišić Bogišić, Lidija (2022). O neslavenskom stanovništvu na vukovarskom području. Hrvatska sveučilišna naklada. ISBN 978-953-169-497-1.
