= Church of St. George, Bobota =

Serbian Orthodox church in Bobota, Croatia

Church of St. George
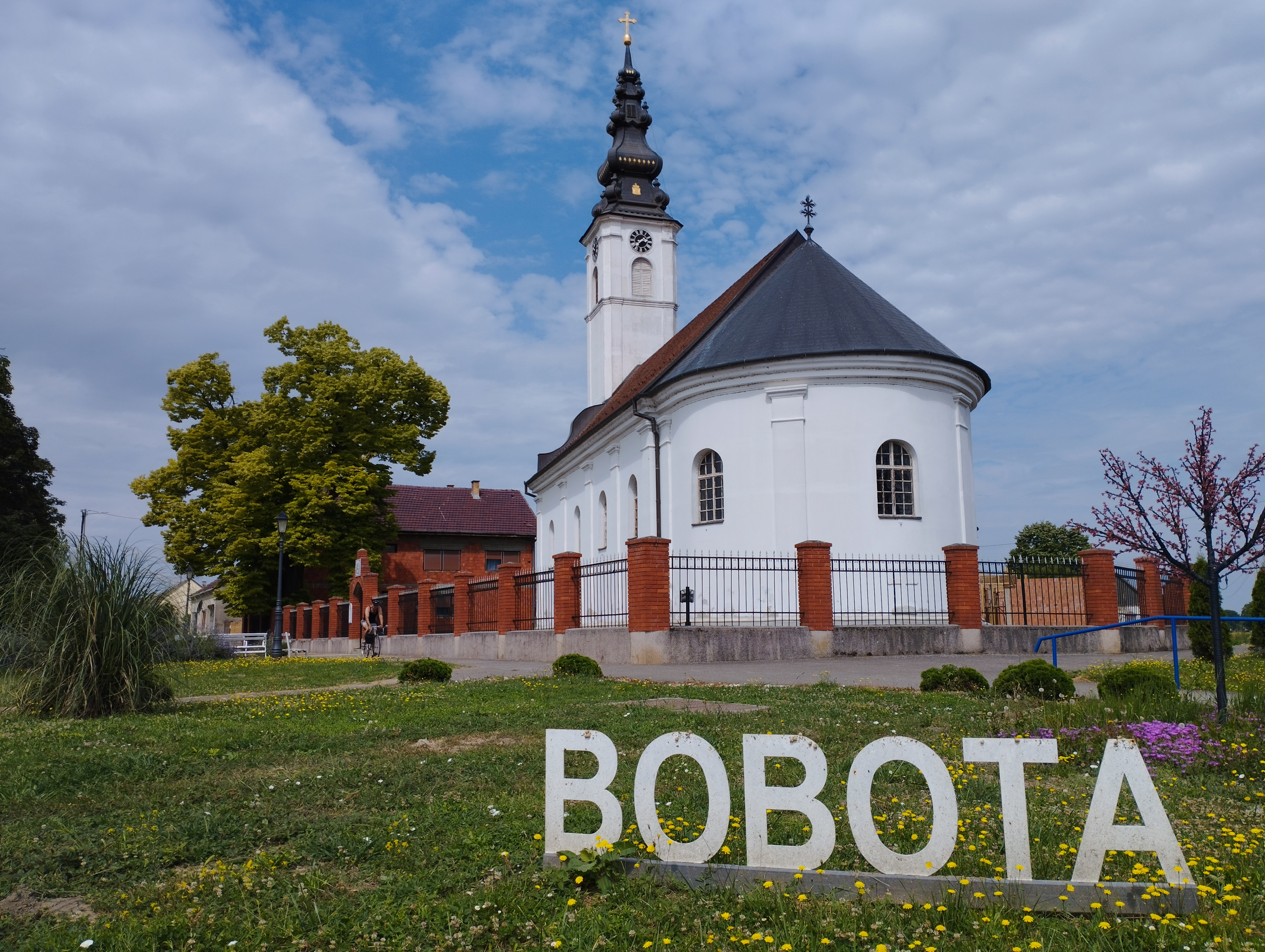
- Church of St. George
- 45°25′19″N 18°51′24″E
- Location: Bobota
- Country: Croatia
- Denomination: Serbian Orthodox

History
- Dedication: St. George

Architecture
- Style: Baroque and Classicism

Administration
- Archdiocese: Eparchy of Osijek Plain and Baranya

The Church of St. George (Croatian: Crkva svetog Đorđa, Serbian Cyrillic: Црква светог Ђорђа) in Bobota is Serbian Orthodox church in eastern Croatia. The church is famous for its icons in the iconostasis that were painted in 1778. During the Croatian War of Independence, administration of Eparchy of Osijek Plain and Baranya sent the icons on the restoration and preservation in Vojvodina. The icons were returned to the church after the end of war. The decision to remove the cultural property from the church caused controversy and was an open issue in Croatia–Serbia relations up until the final return of icons.

== History ==
First Eastern Orthodox Christians in Bobota are mentioned in document from 1366 during the Kingdom of Hungary rule in the region. 30 Serb households are mentioned in 1558 during the Ottoman Hungary period. One older Serbian Orthodox church, mentioned in 1733, existed at the site of the present day church. The decision to build a new one was made in 1762 when the Village Knez (petty nobility title) Jovan Nedeljković. Until 1866 the village was organized into two Serbian Orthodox parishes with two priests with families living in Bobota. Up until the beginning of the World War I the church tower had a 600 kilogram four rings built in Pest which were then confiscated by the Austro-Hungarian Army. After the establishment of the Kingdom of Serbs, Croats and Slovenes new four rings of 1400 kilograms were made in Ljubljana. During the World War II in Yugoslavia and the Genocide of Serbs in the Independent State of Croatia the church was converted into a Roman Catholic church. At the final stage of the war in 1945, Yugoslav Partisans burned down the parish building which was next to the church. The new parish building was built in 1952 during the early years of the existence of the Socialist Republic of Croatia.

== See also ==
- List of Serbian Orthodox churches in Croatia
- Eparchy of Osijek Plain and Baranya
- Serbs of Croatia
