= Bobota Canal =

Croatian Canal

Coordinates: 45°27′41″N 18°36′14″E

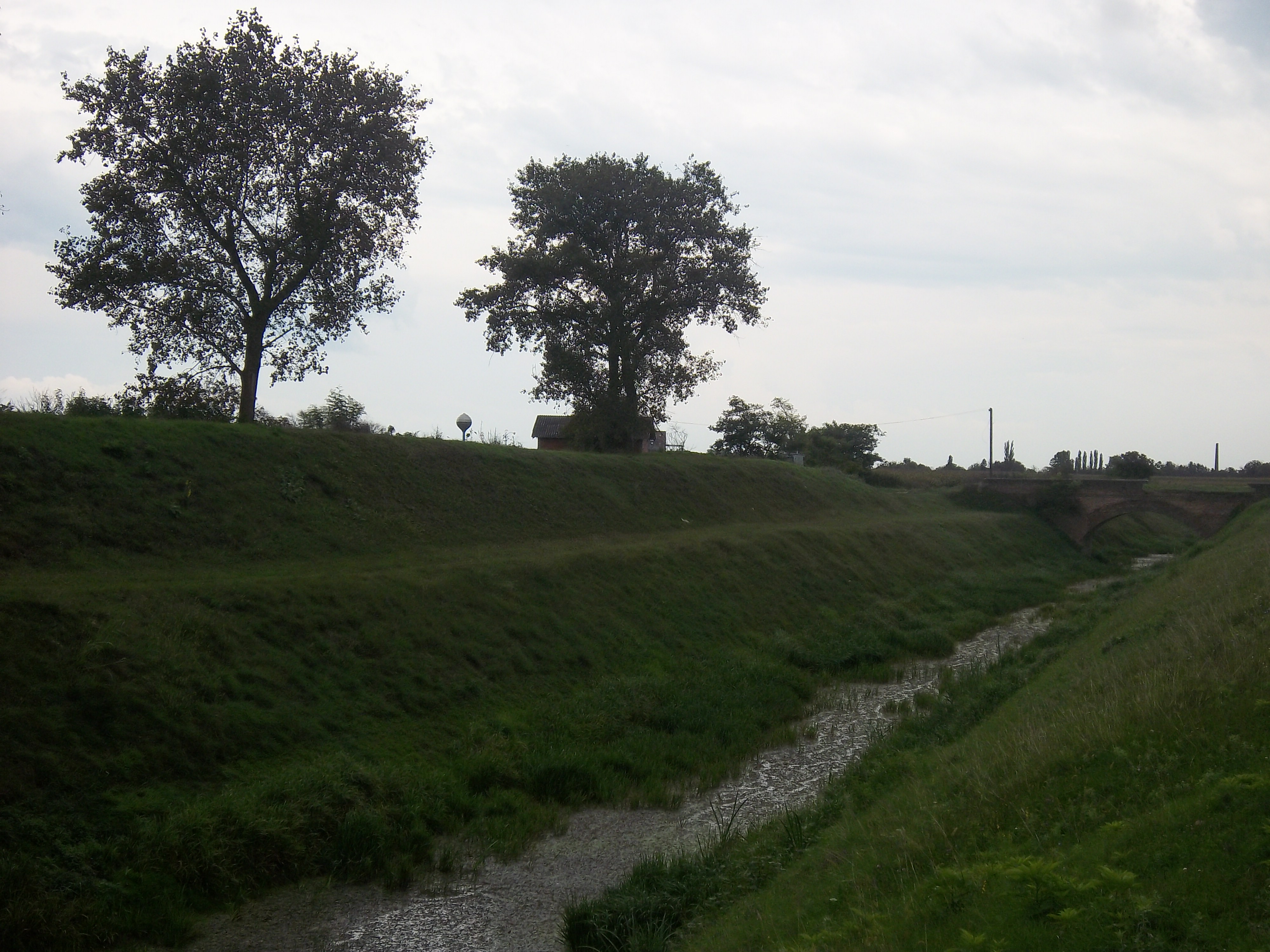
- Bobota Canal next to the village of Bobota
- Interactive map of Bobota Canal

Specifications
- Length: 31.52 miles (50.73 km)
- Status: Open

History
- Former names: Kolodvar-Bobota Canal
- Original owner: Vukovar-Syrmia County, Osijek-Baranja County, Croatian Waters
- Principal engineer: Friedrich Wilhelm Toussaint
- Date of act: early 19th century
- Date of first use: 19th century
- Date completed: 1830-1836
- Date restored: 1856-1857 1895-1896; 1908 1920

Geography
- Start point: Vuka (Vladislavci)
- End point: Vuka (Vukovar)

The Bobota Canal (Croatian: Bobotski kanal, Serbian Cyrillic: Боботски канал, Hungarian: Bobota-csatorna) is a 50.73 kilometers long canal in Croatia. It is named after the eponymous village of Bobota.

The canal is classified as a water management system of paramount importance for irrigation and flood protection for settlements in the surrounding area. It is a channel of the first category in Croatia.

== History ==
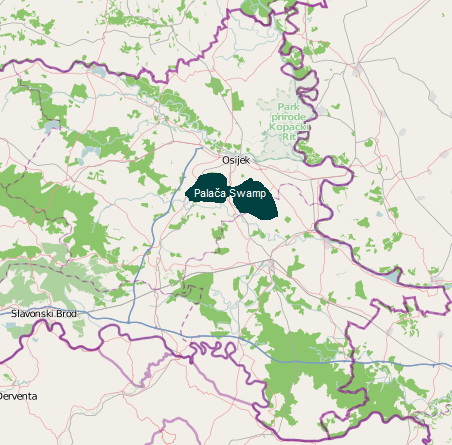
Historical Palača Swamp

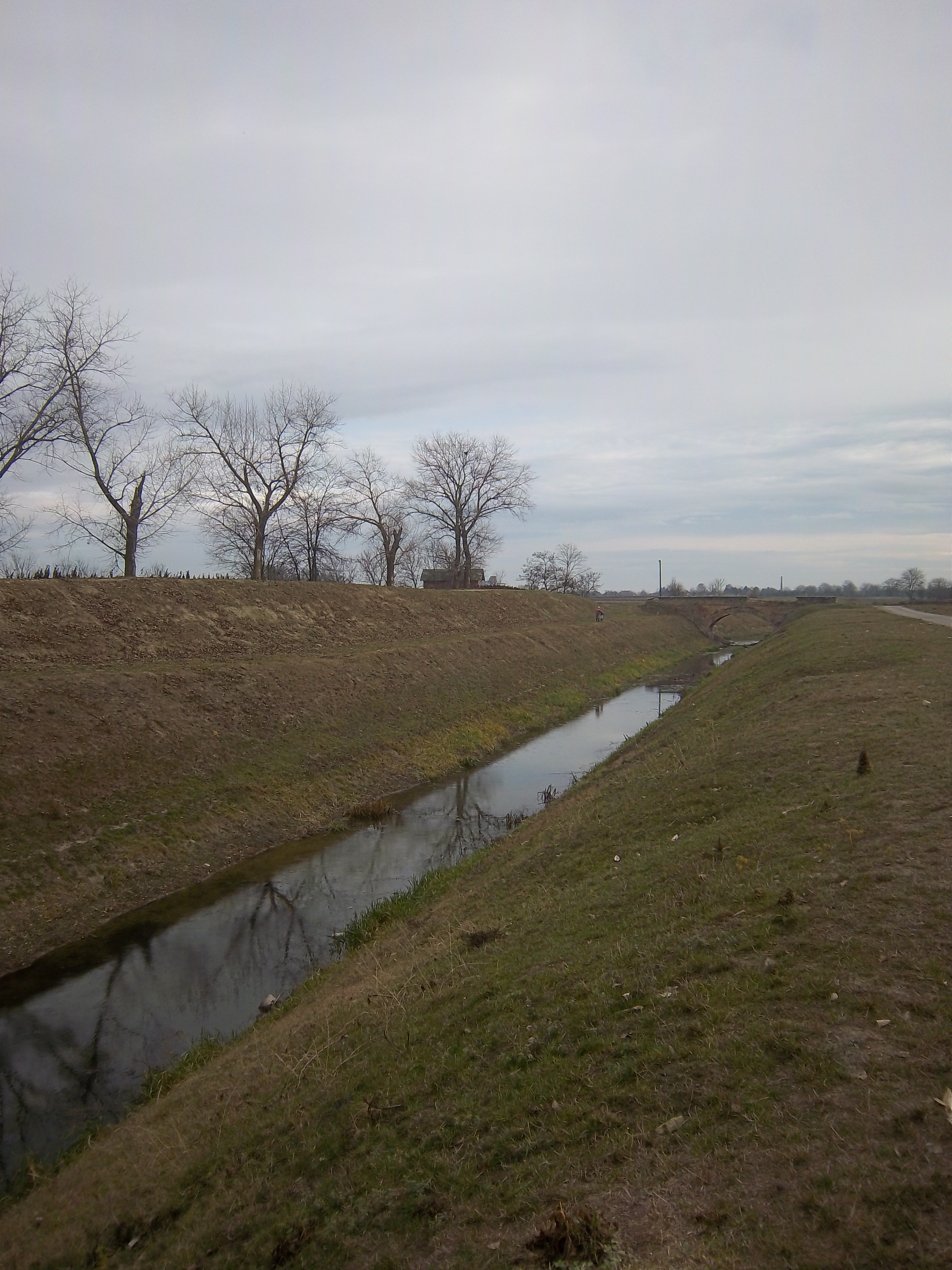
Bobota, Croatia

Construction of the Bobota Canal started in the early 19th century with the aim of prevention of epidemics among people in villages in the swamp and their animals. Up to that point entire region was covered under Palača Swampland. Works without proper construction permits were initiated by nobleman Ivan Kapistran Adamović. Construction of Bobota Canal in Austria-Hungary period was the first major water management project of its kind and sale in modern-day Croatia in post-Roman Empire period. In the end, the canal constructed in the early 19th century was not efficient due to its insufficient width and depth.

The first extension and deepening of the canal was completed in 1856 and 1857 which were unsuccessful as they did not result in major improvements. In 1870 region suffered major floods which pushed Ivan Kapistran Adamović to invite French water expert Friedrich Wilhelm Toussaint to inspect the area and propose the necessary hydro-technical measures. During his 3-month long stay Toussaint proposed technical solutions which included acquisition of new 575.5 kilometres (357.6 mi) square of new agricultural lands while complete costs were lower than the damage of the 1870 floods.

Toussaint's solution was not implemented at the time, but it served as a basis for all future projects. On 7 September 1876 the Association for the Regulation of the Vuka River was established with Roman Catholic bishop Josip Juraj Strossmayer as its first president. This date is today celebrated as the Day of the Croatian Waters. New works on the Bobota Canal lasted between 1895 and 1925.

In 2003, reconstruction of the canal was part of a larger project funded by the World Bank.

== Route ==
The canal is 50.73 kilometres (31.52 mi) long from west to east.

== Settlements along the canal ==
- Vukovar
- Bršadin
- Lipovača
- Trpinja
- Bobota
- Ćelije
- Ernestinovo
- Divoš
- Vladislavci
