= Lipovača, Vukovar-Syrmia County =

Lipovača
- Village
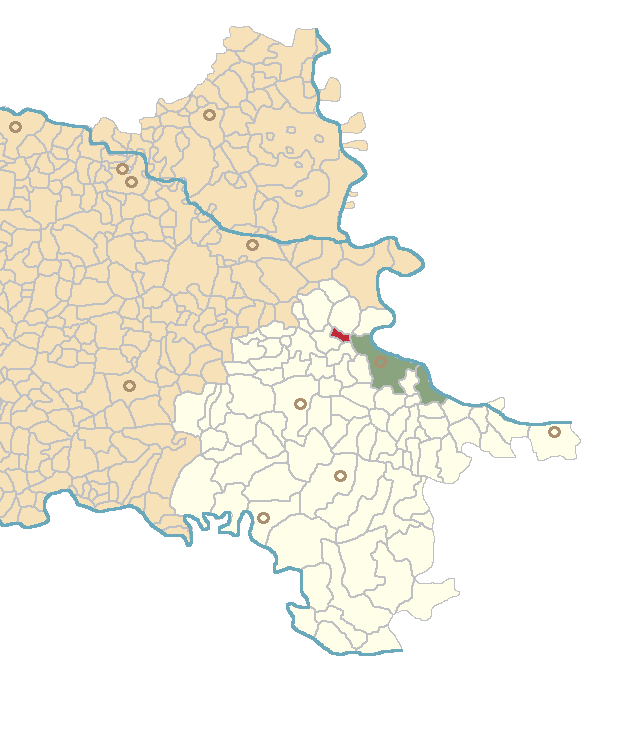

- Location within Vukovar-Syrmia County Location within Croatia Location within Europe
- Coordinates: 45°23′N 18°54′E
- Country: Croatia
- Region: Slavonia (Podunavlje)
- County: Vukovar-Syrmia
- Municipality: Vukovar

Area
  - Total: 4.8 km^{2} (1.9 sq mi)

Population (2021)
  - Total: 323
  - Density: 67/km^{2} (170/sq mi)
- Time zone: UTC+1 (CET)
  - Summer (DST): UTC+2 (CEST)

Lipovača is a village in Croatia. It is connected by the D2 highway. Administratively, village is part of town of Vukovar, seat of Vukovar-Syrmia County. Bobota Canal passes next to the village. Lipovača forms a western salient of the Town of Vukovar surrounded by the Municipality of Trpinja. The location was originally established as a pustara, a Pannonian type of hamlet.
