= Slakovci railway station =

Railway station in Croatia

Slakovci

General information
- Location: Slakovci; Vukovar-Syrmia County; Croatia
- Coordinates: 45.2151°N 18.9464°E
- Operator: Croatian Railways
- Line: M104 railway (Croatia)
- Platforms: 2 high platforms
- Tracks: 2
- Connections: No direct public transport available

Construction
- Parking: Limited free public parking
- Cycle facilities: Yes
Location

Slakovci railway station (Croatian: Željezničko stajalište Slakovci) is a railway stop on Novska–Tovarnik railway in Croatia. The station is operated by Croatian Railways, the state-owned railway company. It is located at the southern edge of the village of Slakovci.

On 19 January 2012 reconstruction of the Slakovci railway station was completed. It was a part of reconstruction of nine railway stations on 67 kilometer route between Vinkovci and Tovarnik-Croatia–Serbia border funded from the Instrument for Pre-Accession Assistance of the European Union (48%) and Croatian Government (52%).

== See also ==
- Orient Express which used the line on which the station is located.
- Tovarnik railway station
- Vinkovci railway station
- Zagreb–Belgrade railway
- Church of Saint Anne, Slakovci

Preceding station	Slakovci railway station	Following station
Sremske Laze	M104 railway (Croatia); Novska to Tovarnik route	Orolik
