= Orolik railway station =

Railway station in Croatia

Orolik
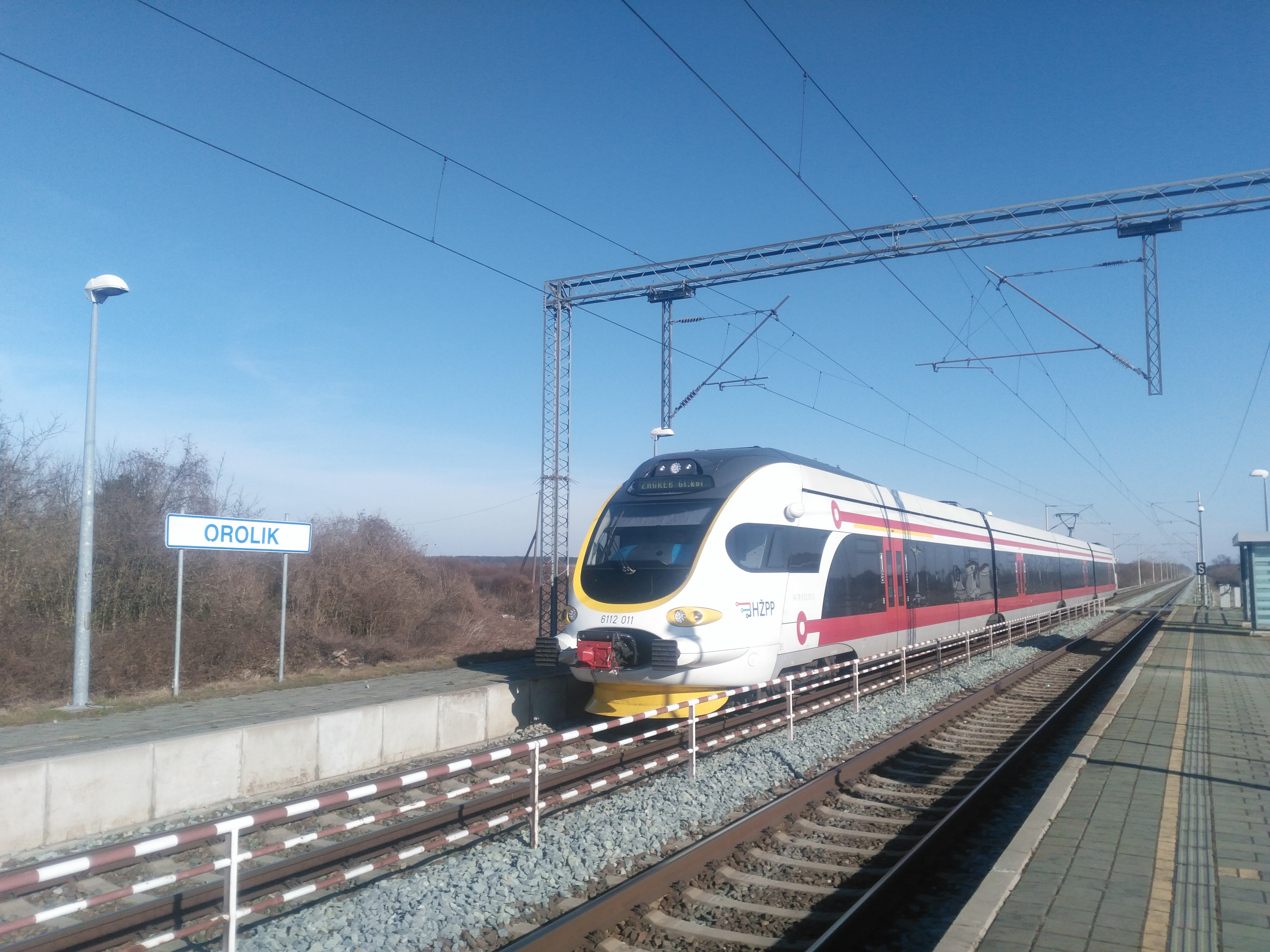

General information
- Location: Orolik; Vukovar-Syrmia County; Croatia
- Coordinates: 45.2066°N 18.9757°E
- Operator: Croatian Railways
- Line: M104 railway (Croatia)
- Platforms: 2 high platforms
- Tracks: 2
- Connections: No direct public transport available

Construction
- Parking: Limited free public parking
- Cycle facilities: Yes
Location

Orolik railway station (Croatian: Željezničko stajalište Orolik, Serbian Cyrillic: Железничко стајалиште Оролик) is a railway stop on Novska–Tovarnik railway in Croatia. The station is operated by Croatian Railways, the state-owned railway company. It is located at the southern edge of the village of Orolik.

On 19 January 2012 reconstruction of the Orolik railway station was completed. It was part of reconstruction of nine railway stations on 67 kilometer route between Vinkovci and Tovarnik-Croatia–Serbia border funded from the Instrument for Pre-Accession Assistance of the European Union (48%) and Croatian Government (52%).

== See also ==
- Church of St. Peter and Paul, Orolik
- Orient Express which used the line on which the station is located.
- Tovarnik railway station
- Vinkovci railway station
- Zagreb–Belgrade railway

| Preceding station | Orolik railway station | Following station |
|---|---|---|
| Slakovci | M105 railway (Croatia); Novska to Tovarnik route | Đeletovci |
