= Vinkovački Banovci railway station =

Railway station in Croatia

Vinkovački Banovci
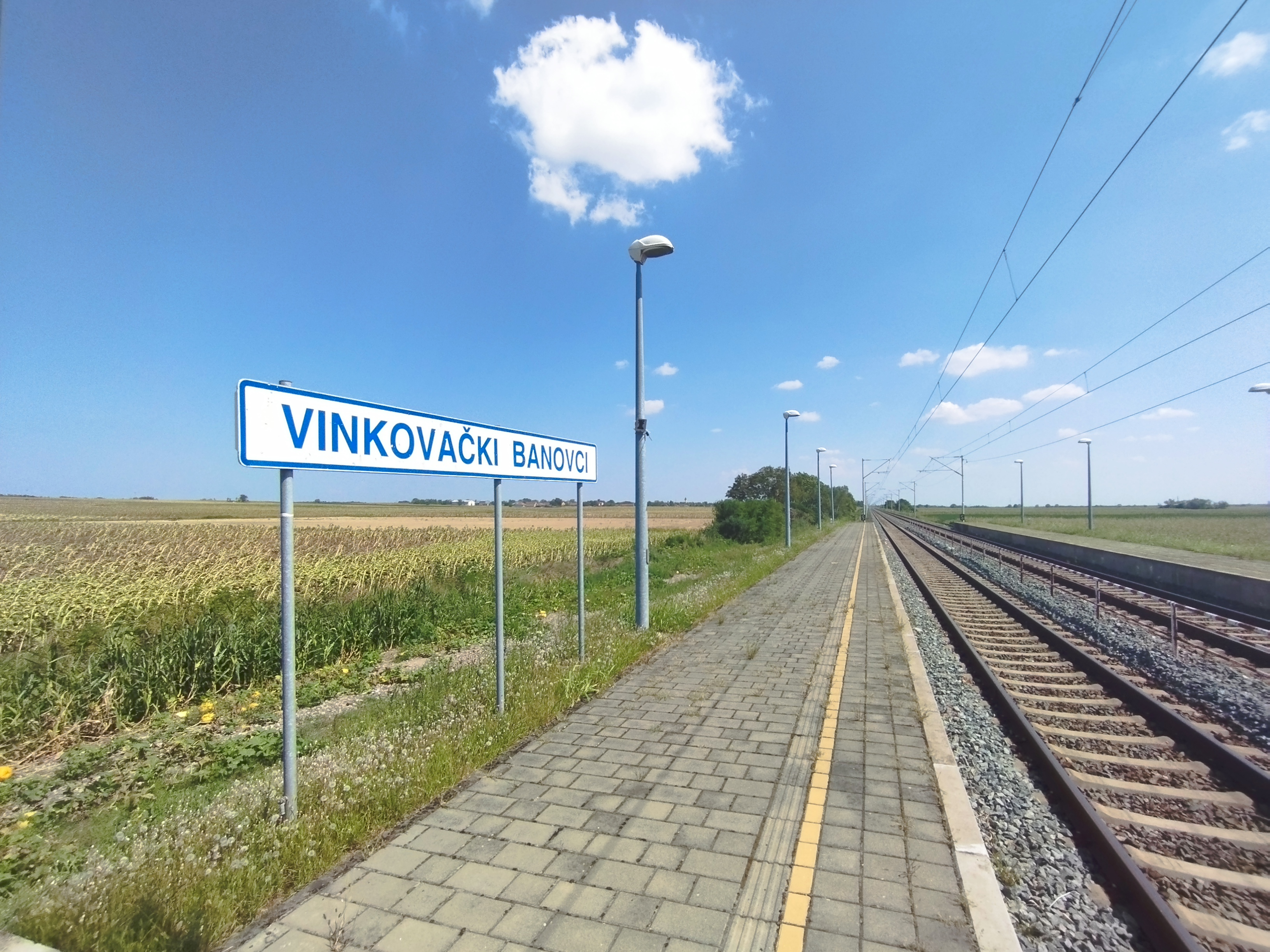
- Eastward view towards the neighboring Banovci

General information
- Location: Vukovar-Syrmia County; Croatia
- Coordinates: 45.1858°N 19.0471°E
- Operator: Croatian Railways
- Line: M104 railway (Croatia)
- Platforms: 2 high platforms
- Tracks: 2
- Connections: No direct public transport available. Bus station with local (Vinkovci and Vukovar) and international (Belgrade) connections located approximately 400m north.

Construction
- Parking: Limited free public parking
- Cycle facilities: Yes
Location

Vinkovački Banovci railway station (Croatian: Željezničko stajalište Vinkovački Banovci, Serbian Cyrillic: Железничко стајалиште Винковачки Бановци) is a railway stop on Novska–Tovarnik railway in Croatia. The station is operated by Croatian Railways, the state-owned railway company. It is located at the northern edge of the village of Vinkovački Banovci.

On 19 January 2012 reconstruction of the Vinkovački Banovci railway station was completed. It was a part of reconstruction of nine railway stations on 67 kilometer route between Vinkovci and Tovarnik-Croatia–Serbia border funded from the Instrument for Pre-Accession Assistance of the European Union (48%) and Croatian Government (52%).

== See also ==
- Orient Express which used the line on which the station is located.
- Tovarnik railway station
- Vinkovci railway station
- Zagreb–Belgrade railway

Preceding station	Vinkovački Banovci railway station	Following station
Đeletovci	M104 railway (Croatia); Novska to Tovarnik route	Šidski Banovci
