= Šidski Banovci railway station =

Railway station in Croatia

Šidski Banovci
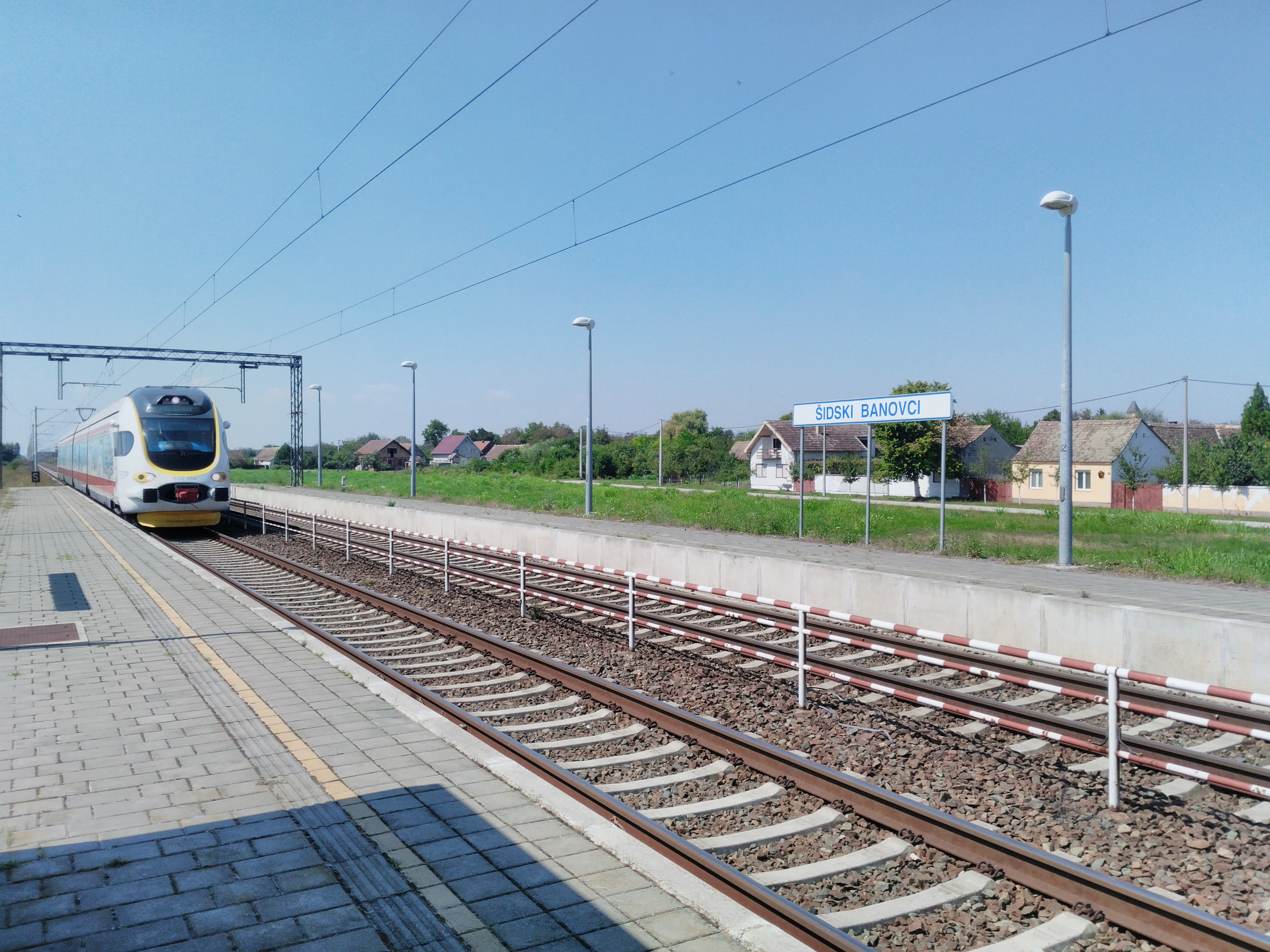
- Šidski Banovci railway station

General information
- Location: Vukovar-Syrmia County; Croatia
- Coordinates: 45.180°N 19.067°E
- Operator: Croatian Railways
- Line: M104 railway (Croatia)
- Platforms: 2 high platforms
- Tracks: 2
- Connections: No direct public transport available. Bus station with limited local (Vinkovci and Vukovar) and international (Belgrade) connections located 700m away.

Construction
- Parking: Limited free public parking
- Cycle facilities: Yes
Location

Šidski Banovci railway station (Croatian: Željezničko stajalište Šidski Banovci, Serbian Cyrillic: Железничко стајалиште Шидски Бановци) is a railway station on Novska–Tovarnik railway in Croatia. The station is operated by Croatian Railways, the state-owned railway company. It is located at the southern edge of the village of Banovci which itself was officially known as Šidski Banovci up until 1991. Historical L213 local line to Vukovar was passing on the eastern side on the village but is today out of use and in deteriorated condition.

On 19 January 2012 reconstruction of the Šidski Banovci railway station was completed. It was a part of reconstruction of nine railway stations on 67 kilometers route between Vinkovci and Tovarnik-Croatia–Serbia border funded from the Instrument for Pre-Accession Assistance of the European Union (48%) and Croatian Government (52%). Italian SALCEF Building Construction and Railway S.p.A. completed construction works valued 41.766.847,33 €, Italian branch of the Bombardier Transportation together with SITE SPA completed traffic signaling and traffic management system worth 16.411.114,98 € while the control over the works paid 2.005.000,00 € was completed by Spanish Técnica y Proyectos SA (TYPSA).

== Gallery ==
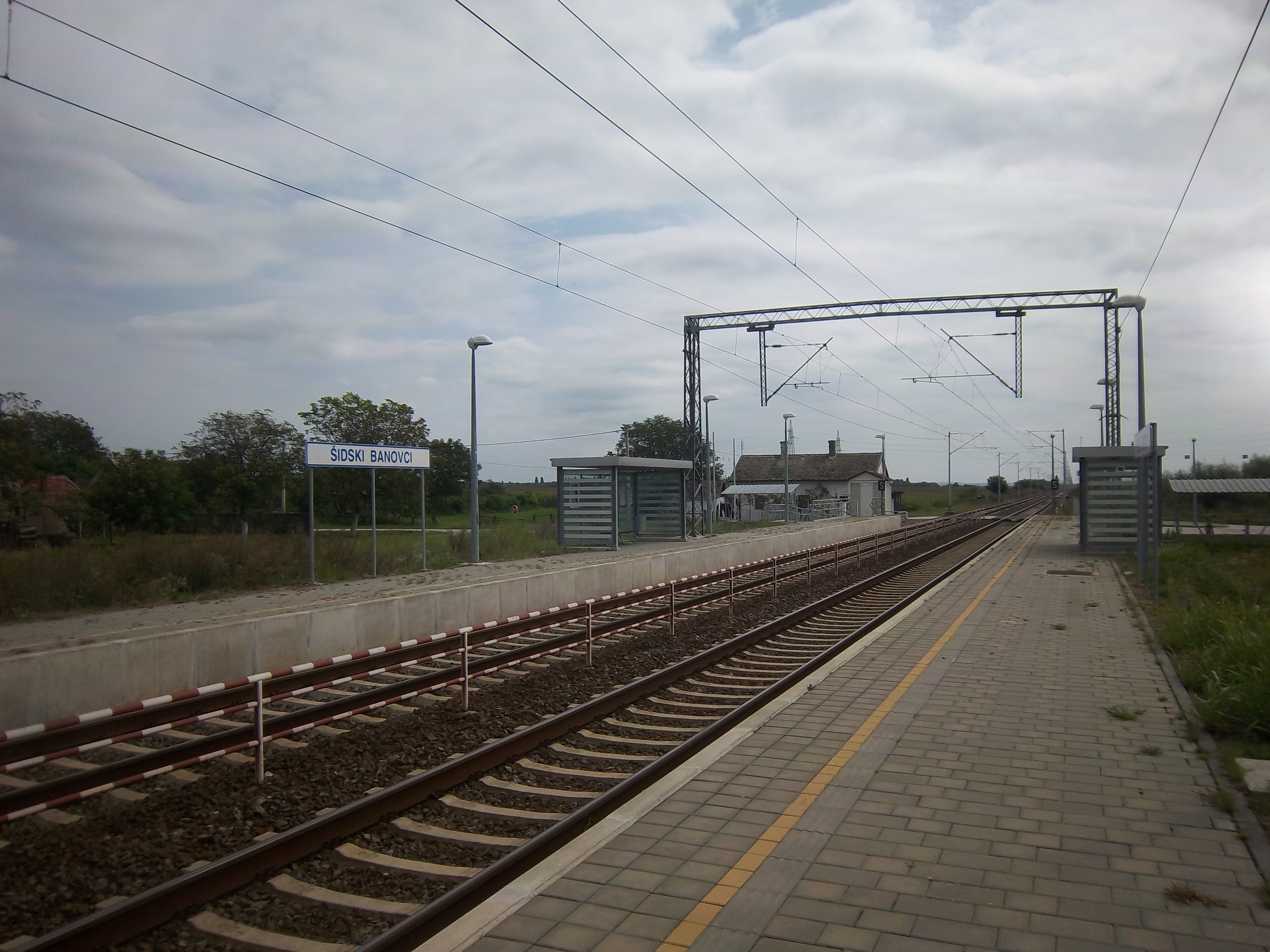
Railway station (view towards east).

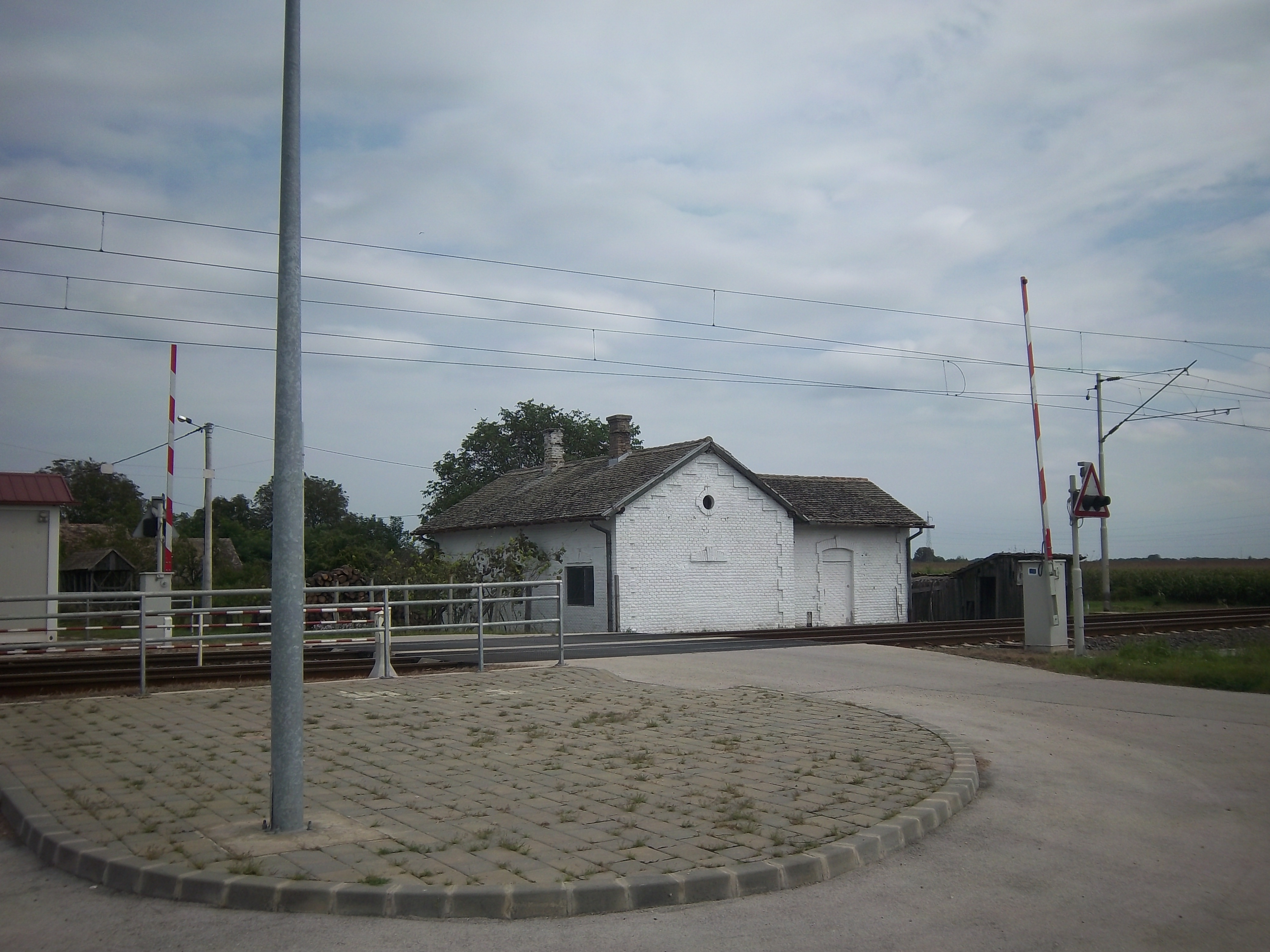
Old railway station building and parking entrance.

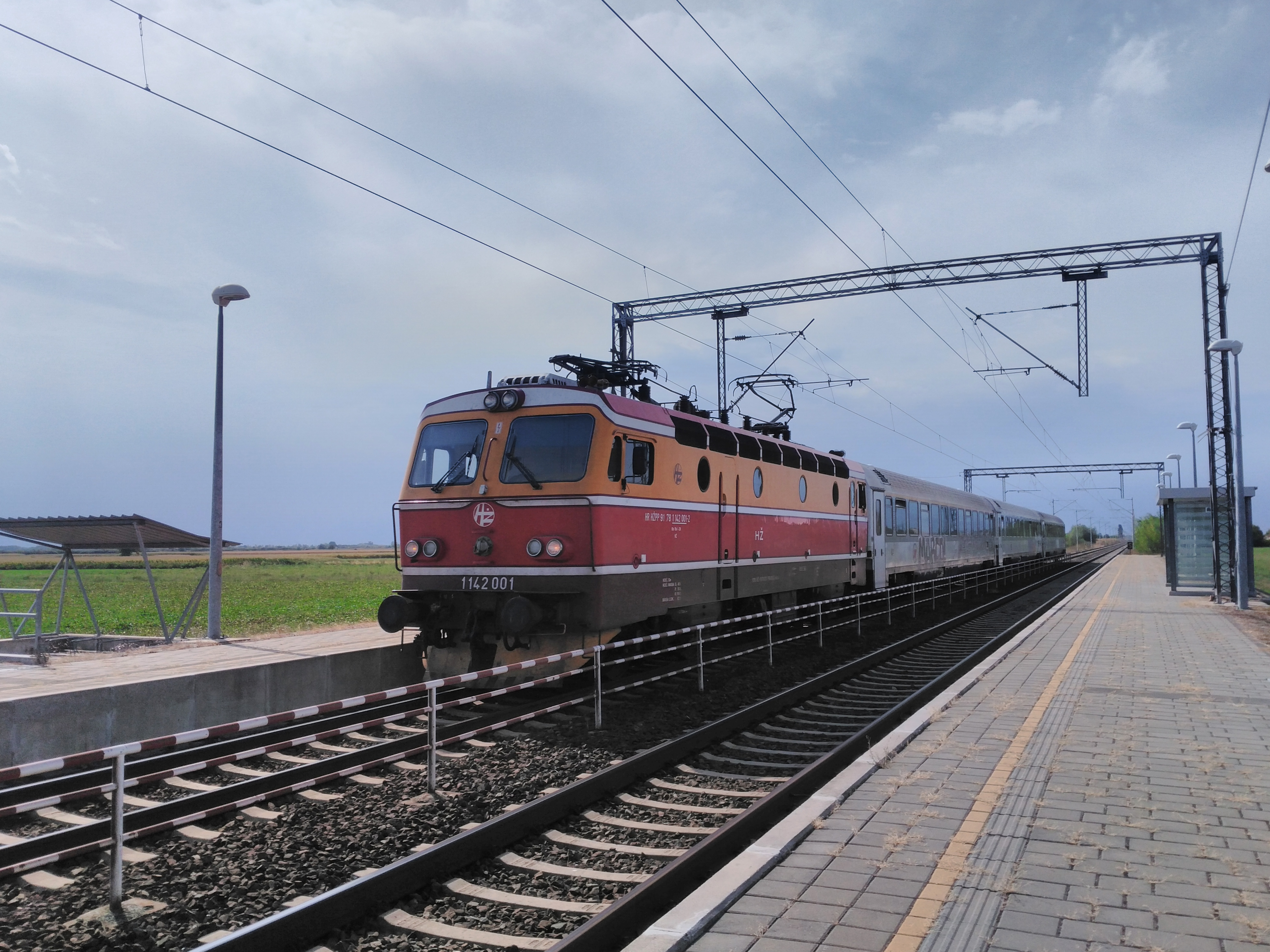
Old type of a train arriving at the train station.

== See also ==
- Orient Express which used the line on which the station is located.
  - Strizivojna–Vrpolje railway station (the location of murder in the Murder on the Orient Express)
- Vinkovci railway station
- Zagreb–Belgrade railway
- Church of the Holy Venerable Mother Parascheva

Preceding station	Šidski Banovci railway station	Following station
Vinkovački Banovci	M104 railway (Croatia); Novska to Tovarnik route	Ilača
