= Ilača railway station =

Railway station in Croatia

Ilača

General information
- Location: Vukovar-Syrmia County; Croatia
- Coordinates: 45.1734°N 19.0896°E
- Operator: Croatian Railways
- Line: M104 railway (Croatia)
- Platforms: 2 high platforms
- Tracks: 2
- Connections: No direct public transport available

Construction
- Parking: Limited free public parking
- Cycle facilities: Yes
Location

Ilača railway station (Croatian: Željezničko stajalište Ilača) is a railway station on Novska–Tovarnik railway in Croatia. The station is operated by Croatian Railways, the state-owned railway company. It is located at the southern edge of the village of Ilača.

On 19 January 2012 reconstruction of the Ilača railway station was completed. It was a part of reconstruction of nine railway stations on 67 kilometer route between Vinkovci and Tovarnik-Croatia–Serbia border funded from the Instrument for Pre-Accession Assistance of the European Union (48%) and Croatian Government (52%).

== See also ==
- Tovarnik railway station
- Vinkovci railway station
- Zagreb–Belgrade railway
- Ilača apparitions

Preceding station	Ilača railway station	Following station
Šidski Banovci	M104 railway (Croatia); Novska to Tovarnik route	Tovarnik
