= Đeletovci railway station =

Railway station in Nijemci, Croatia

Coordinates: 45°11′33″N 19°1′21″E

Đeletovci
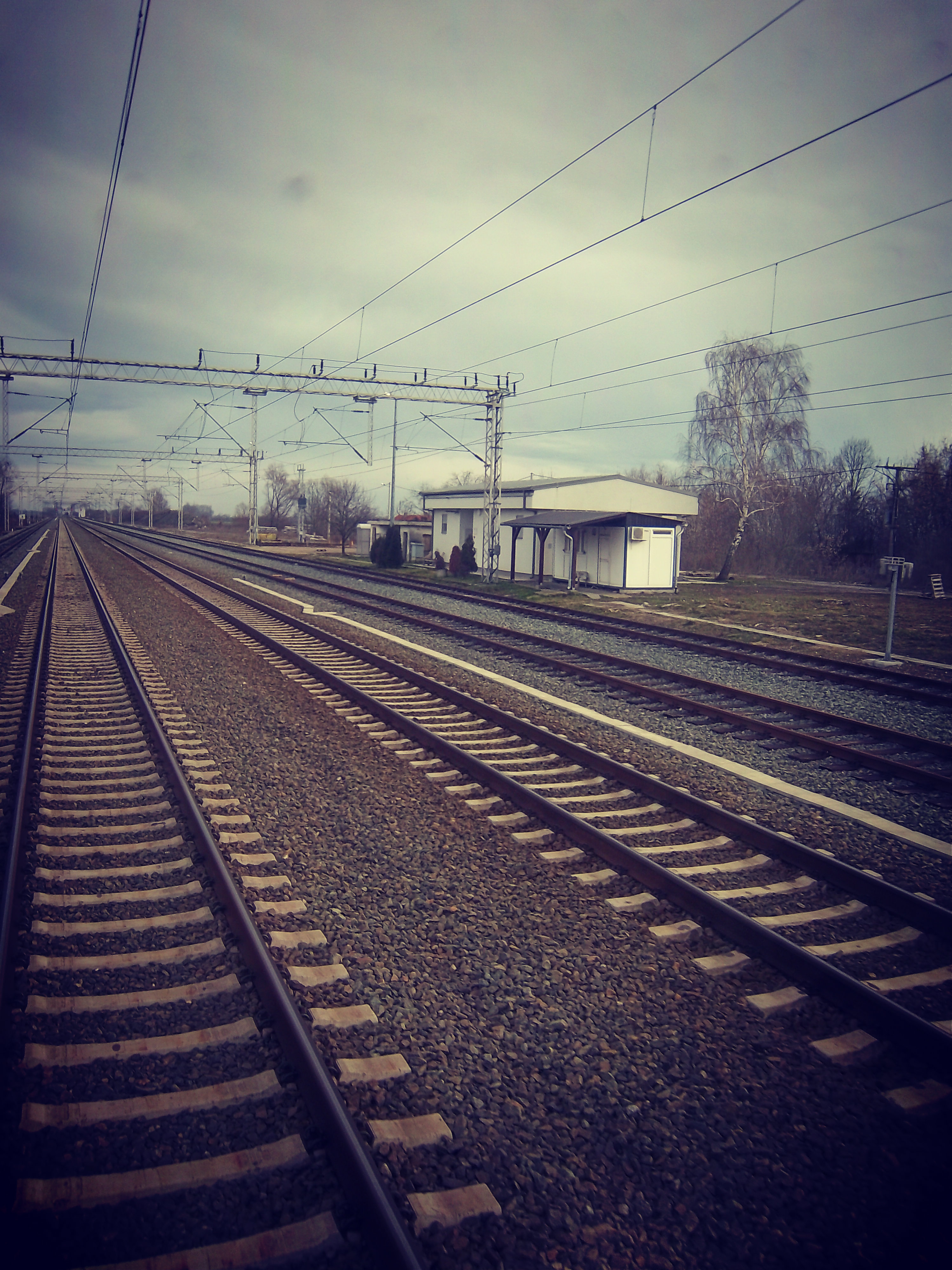

General information
- Location: Croatia
- Tracks: 5
Location

Đeletovci railway station (Croatian: Željeznički kolodvor Đeletovci) is a railway station on Novska–Tovarnik railway, located in Đeletovci. The station consists of five railway tracks.

Since 2012 railway reconstruction, the station has been used exclusively for freight, with passenger trains stopping at newly built Đeletovci stajalište halt.

== See also ==
- Croatian Railways
- Zagreb–Belgrade railway

Preceding station	Đeletovci railway station	Following station
Orolik	M104 railway (Croatia); Novska to Tovarnik route	Vinkovački Banovci
