= Zagreb-Tovarnik railway =

Zagreb-Tovarnik railway is a vernacular term for a consecutive series of railways operated by Croatian Railways:

- M102 railway (Croatia), the railway connecting Zagreb Glavni Kolodvor and Dugo Selo
- M103 railway (Croatia), the railway connecting Dugo Selo and Novska
- M104 railway (Croatia), the railway connecting Novska and Tovarnik

== See also ==
- Zagreb–Belgrade railway
