= Sibinj railway station =

Railway station in Croatia

Coordinates: 45°10′52″N 17°54′16″E

Sibinj

General information
- Location: Croatia
- Tracks: 6
Location

Sibinj railway station (Croatian: Željeznička stanica Sibinj) is a railway station on Novska–Tovarnik railway located in Sibinj, Brod-Posavina County. Railroad continued to Oriovac in one and the other direction to Slavonski Brod. Sibinj railway station consists of 6 railway tracks.

== See also ==
- Croatian Railways
- Zagreb–Belgrade railway
