= Garčin railway station =

Railway station in Croatia

Coordinates: 45°10′25″N 18°11′9″E

Garčin
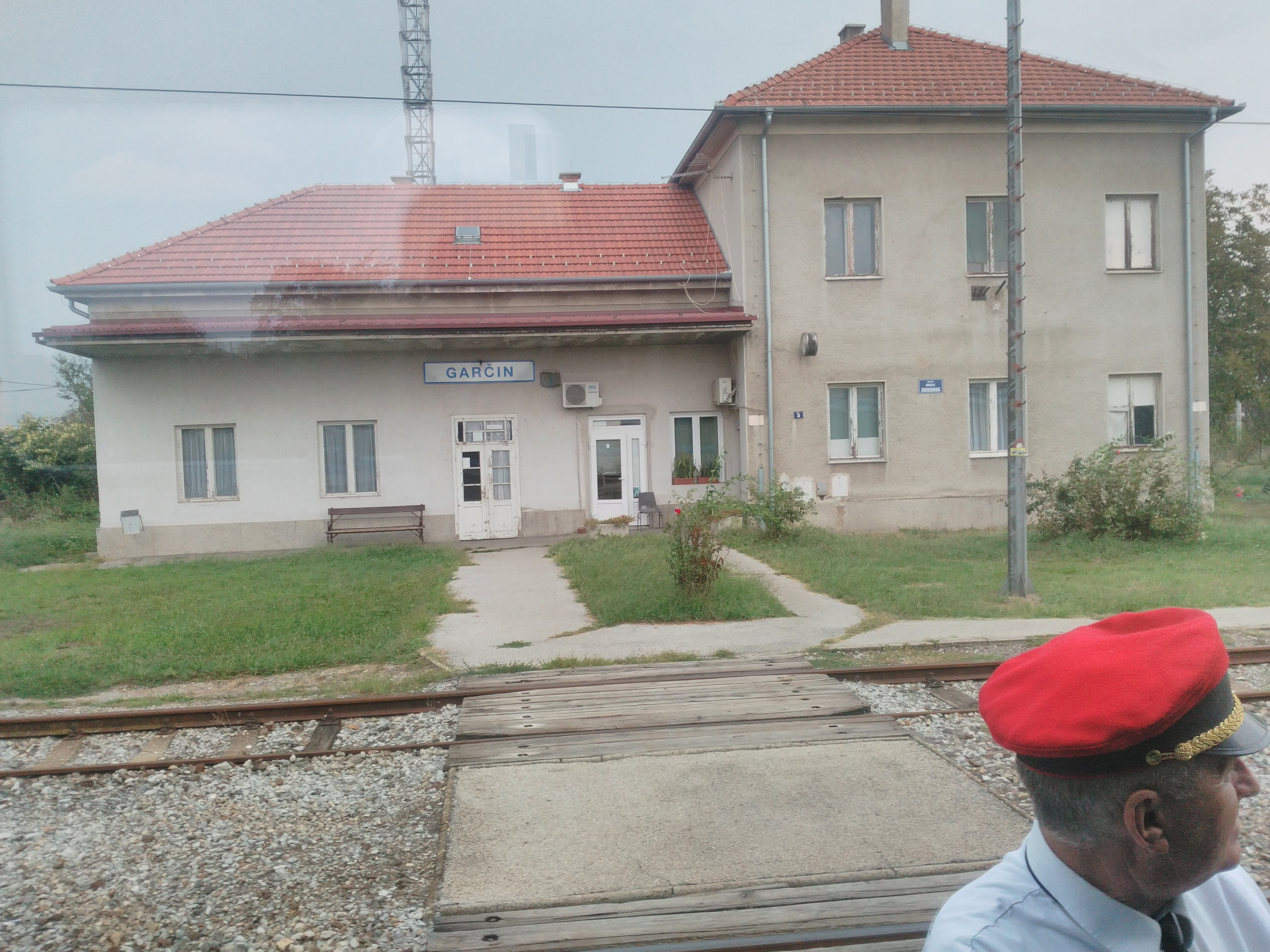

General information
- Location: Garčin; Croatia
- Tracks: 5
Location

Garčin railway station (Croatian: Željeznička stanica Garčin) is a railway station on Novska–Tovarnik railway. Located in settlement Garčin. Railroad continued to Slavonski Brod in one and the other direction to Andrijevci. Garčin railway station consists of 5 railway tracks.

== See also ==
- Croatian Railways
- Zagreb–Belgrade railway
