= Andrijevci railway station =

Railway station in Donji Andrijevci, Croatia

Coordinates: 45°11′25″N 18°17′35″E

Andrijevci

General information
- Location: Croatia
- Tracks: 6
Location

The Andrijevci railway station (Croatian: Željeznička stanica Andrijevci) is a railway station on the Novska–Tovarnik railway.

== Overview ==
The station is located in settlement Donji Andrijevci. The railroad continues to Garčin in one direction and to Strizivojna–Vrpolje in the other. The Andrijevci railway station consists of six railway tracks.

== See also ==
- Croatian Railways
- Zagreb–Belgrade railway
