= Oriovac railway station =

Railway station in Croatia

Coordinates: 45°9′41″N 17°45′13″E

Oriovac
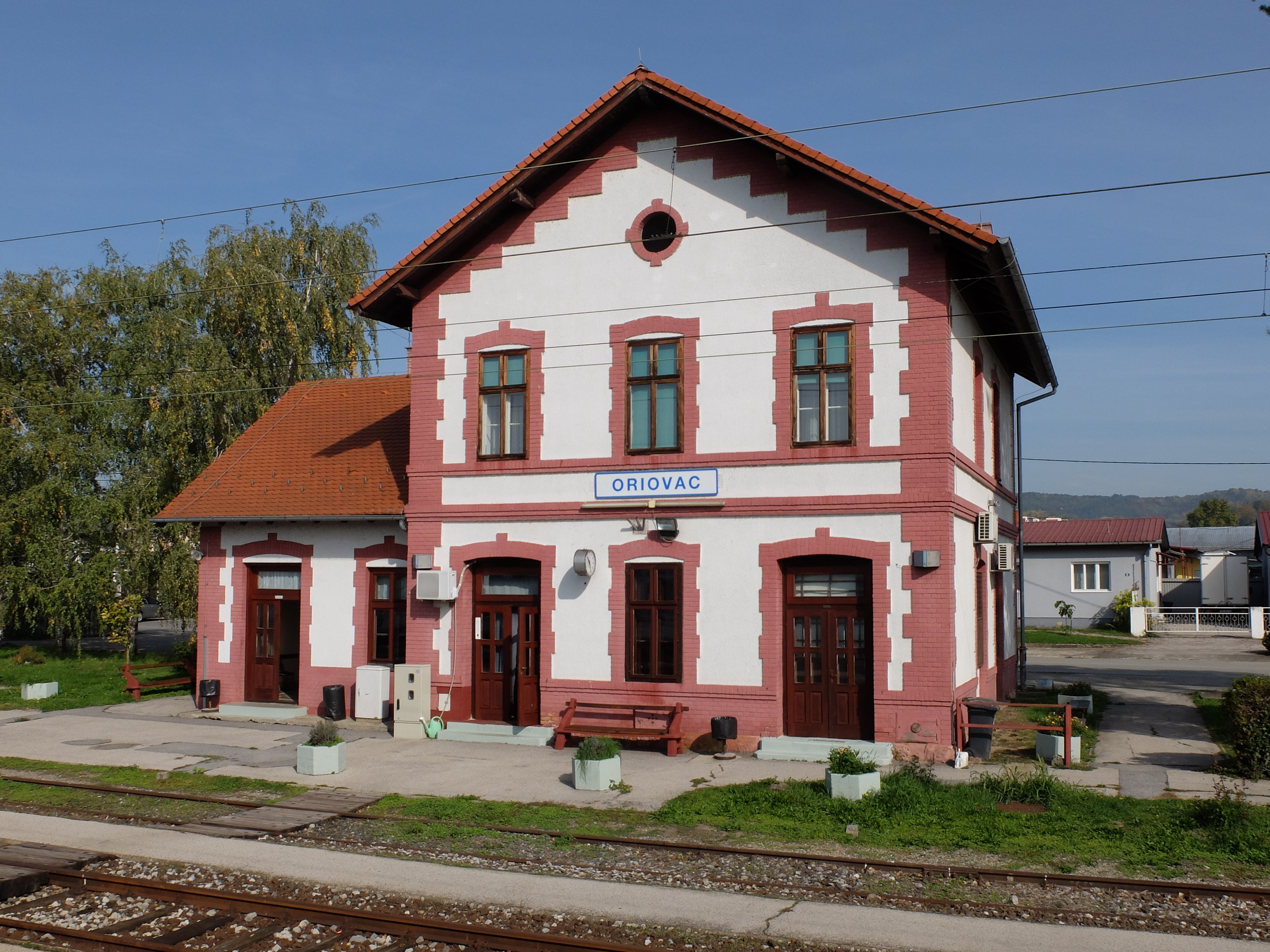

General information
- Location: Croatia
- Tracks: 5
Location

Oriovac railway station (Croatian: Željeznička stanica Oriovac) is a railway station on Novska–Tovarnik railway, located in Oriovac. The railroad continues to Nova Kapela–Batrina in one direction and to Sibinj in the other. Oriovac railway station consists of 5 railway tracks.

== See also ==
- Croatian Railways
- Zagreb–Belgrade railway
