= Mato Damjanović =

Croatian chess grandmaster

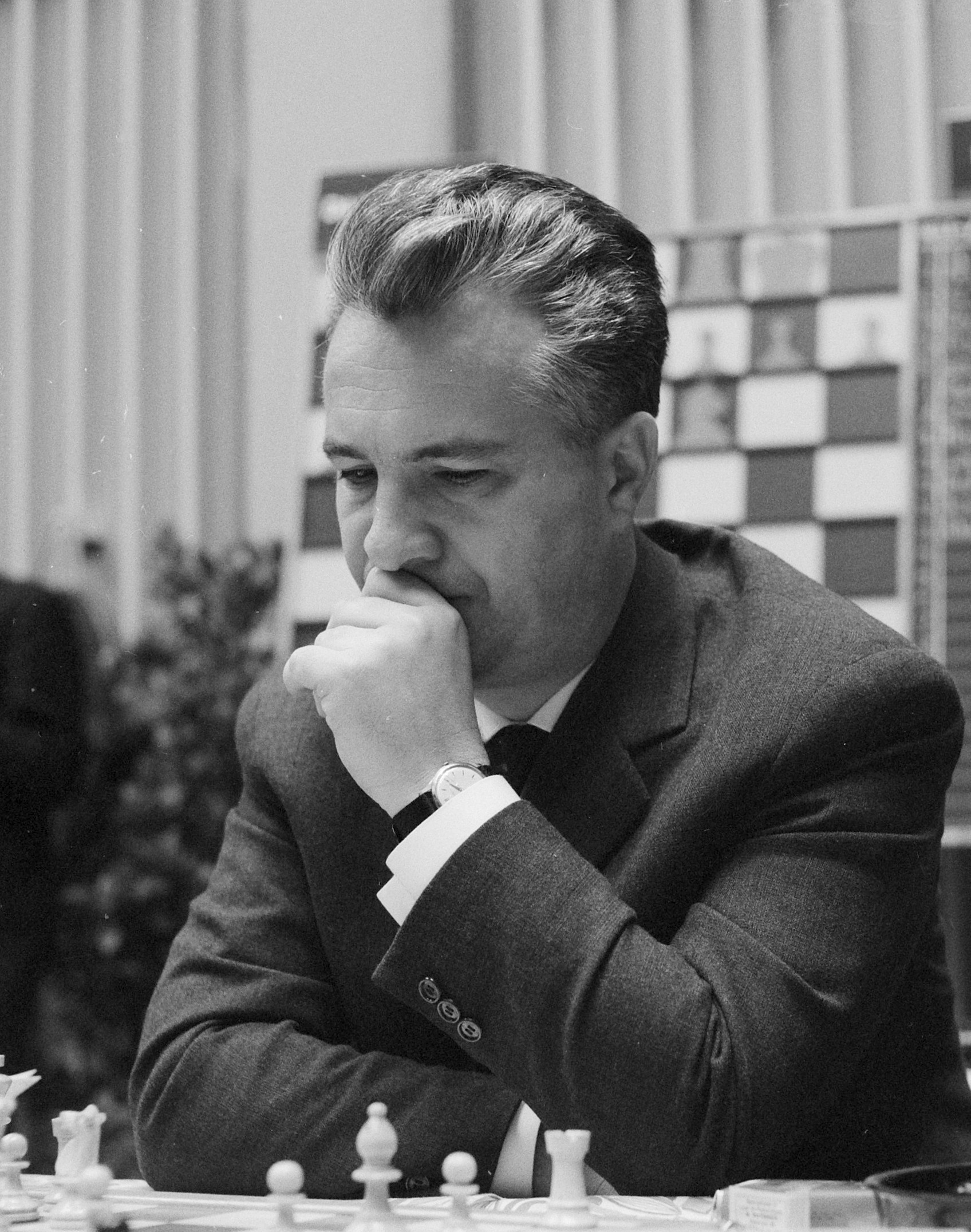
- Damjanović in 1966

Personal information
- Born: 23 March 1927 Đeletovci, Yugoslavia
- Died: 12 February 2011 (aged 83) Zagreb, Croatia

Chess career
- Country: Croatia
- Title: Grandmaster (1964)
- Peak rating: 2490 (July 1971)
- Peak ranking: No. 83 (July 1971)

Mato Damjanović (23 March 1927 – 12 February 2011) was a Croatian chess grandmaster who represented Yugoslavia in international team events. In 1964, he became the second Croatian grandmaster, after Mijo Udovčić.

== Life and career ==
Damjanović was born on 23 March 1927 in Đeletovci, Yugoslavia (now Croatia). He represented Yugoslavia at first reserve board (+6 -2 =2) in the 14th Chess Olympiad at Leipzig 1960, and won individual silver and team bronze medals there. There was a second, more modest appearance for the national team at the European Team Championship, held in Hamburg 1965. His score of +1 -2 =6 was however good enough to contribute to a team silver medal. He was awarded the International Master title in 1962, and the Grandmaster title in 1964.

A prolific tournament player, he participated in hundreds of events during the 1960s and 1970s, his most active period. Although his results were very mixed, they included first or second place at a number of tournaments; principally, second equal at Sochi 1964 (Chigorin Memorial) (making him the first foreigner to score a GM norm while playing in the Soviet Union, first at Rovigo 1966, first at San Benedetto del Tronto 1966, first equal at Paris 1967/8, first at Zagreb 1969, second equal at Netanya 1969, first equal at Bad Pyrmont 1970, second at Reggio Emilia 1971/2, first at Florence 1972, second equal at Zagreb 1972, second at Birmingham 1976, second equal at Vukovar 1976, first equal at Virovitica 1976 and second equal at Birmingham 1977.
