= Slavonski Brod railway station =

Railway station in Slavonski Brod, Croatia

Coordinates: 45°9′47″N 18°0′39″E

Slavonski Brod
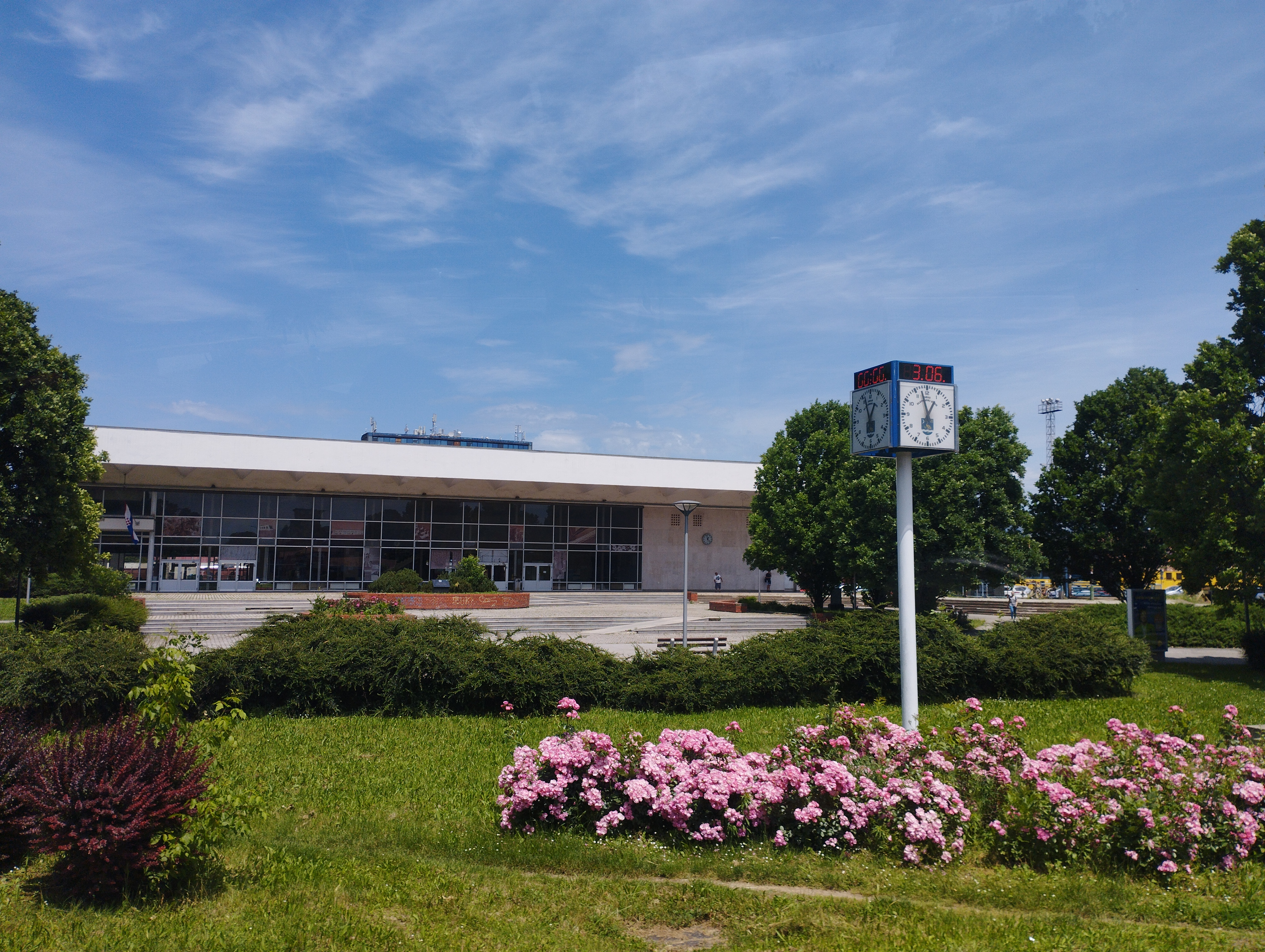

General information
- Location: Croatia
- Tracks: 20
Location

Slavonski Brod railway station (Croatian: Željeznička stanica Slavonski Brod) is a railway station on Novska–Tovarnik railway. Located in Slavonski Brod. Railroad continued to Sibinj in one direction and in the other to Garčin. Slavonski Brod railway station consists of 20 railway tracks.

It - or rather, a mock-up of an older version - appeared in Murder on the Orient Express in the closing scene.

== See also ==
- Croatian Railways
- Zagreb–Belgrade railway
