= Strizivojna–Vrpolje railway station =

Railway station in Croatia

Coordinates: 45°13′37″N 18°24′49″E

Strizivojna–Vrpolje
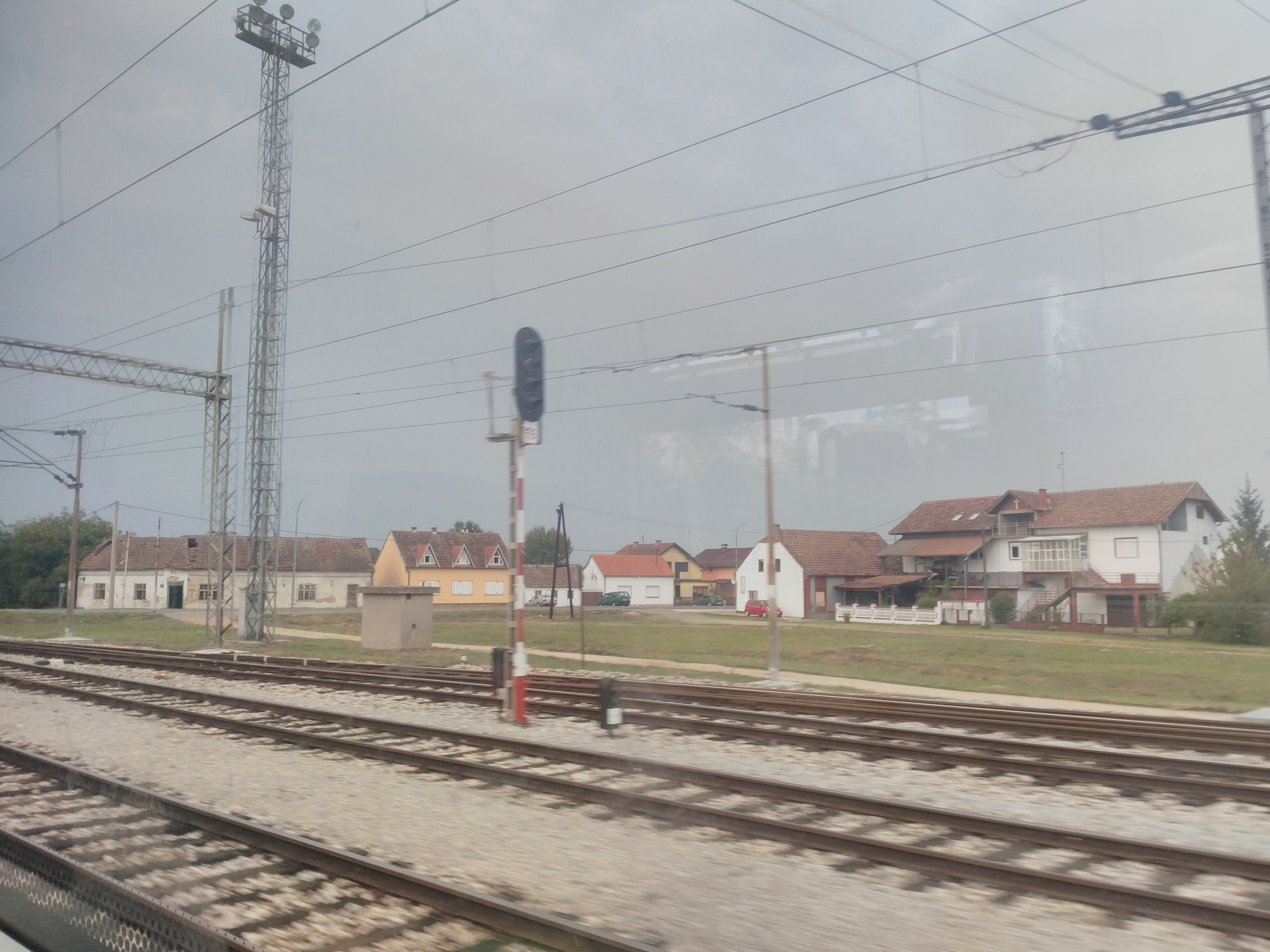

General information
- Location: Croatia
- Tracks: 10
Location

Strizivojna–Vrpolje railway station (Croatian: Željeznička stanica Strizivojna–Vrpolje) is a railway station on Novska–Tovarnik railway. Located between two settlements Strizivojna and Vrpolje. The railroad continued to Andrijevci in one, in the other direction to Stari Mikanovci, in third direction to Đakovo and the fourth direction towards to Kopanica–Beravci. Strizivojna–Vrpolje railway station consists of 10 railway track.

== See also ==
- Croatian Railways
- Zagreb–Belgrade railway
