= Donji Andrijevci =

- Municipality
- Interactive map of Donji Andrijevci
- Location of Donji Andrijevci in Croatia
- Coordinates: 45°11′N 18°18′E
- Country: Croatia
- County: Brod-Posavina County

Government
  - Mayor: Vedran Gavran (HDZ)

Area
  - Municipality: 57.0 km^{2} (22.0 sq mi)
  - Urban: 29.7 km^{2} (11.5 sq mi)

Population (2021)
  - Municipality: 3,059
  - Density: 53.7/km^{2} (139/sq mi)
  - Urban: 2,097
  - Urban density: 70.6/km^{2} (183/sq mi)
- Postal code: 35214 Donji Andrijevci
- Website: donjiandrijevci.hr

Donji Andrijevci is a village and a municipality in the Brod-Posavina County, Croatia.

== Demographics ==
In 2021, the municipality had 3,059 residents in the following settlements:

- Donji Andrijevci, population 2,097
- Novo Topolje, population 117
- Sredanci, population 268
- Staro Topolje, population 577
Donji Andrijevci: Population trends 1857–2021
v

population	2339	2512	2390	2665	2761	2815	2723	3729	4171	4338	4688	4582	4335	4180	4393	3709	3059
	1857	1869	1880	1890	1900	1910	1921	1931	1948	1953	1961	1971	1981	1991	2001	2011	2021

Sources: Croatian Bureau of Statistics publications

In 2011, 96,6% of the population were Croats.

== See also ==
- Andrijevci railway station
