= Đeletovci =

- Village (Selo)
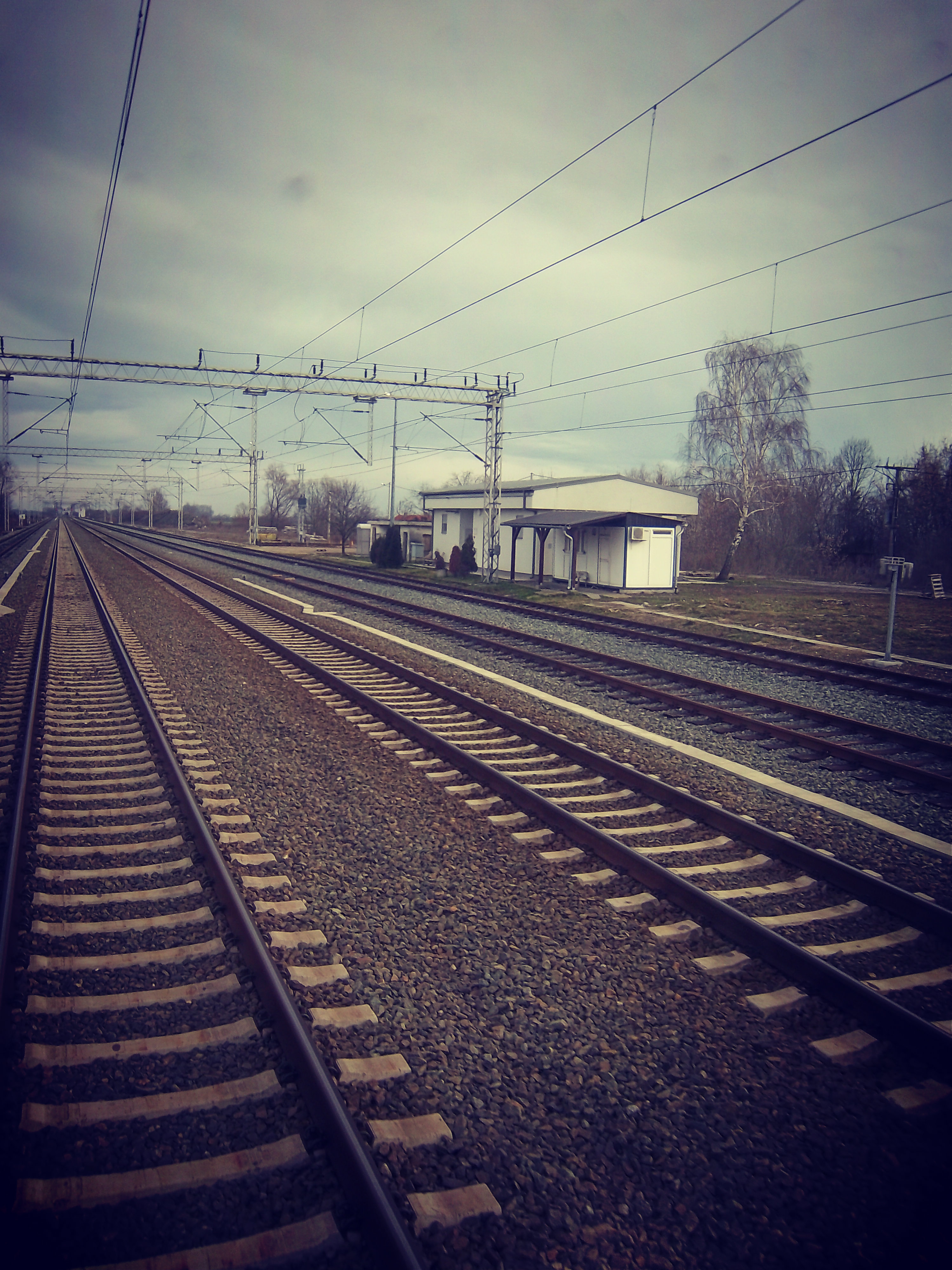
- Đeletovci train station

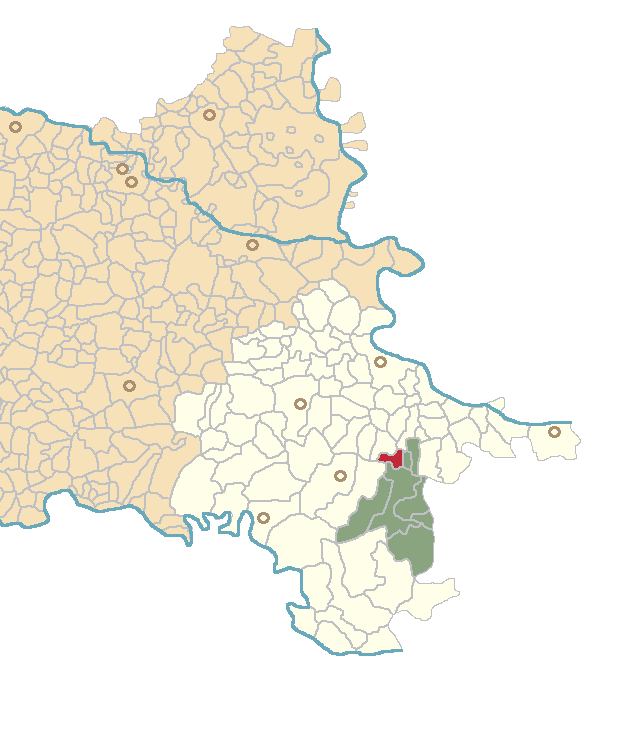

- Location within Vukovar-Syrmia County Location within Croatia Location within Europe
- Coordinates: 45.183°N 19.013°E
- Country: Croatia
- Region: Syrmia (Podunavlje)
- County: Vukovar-Syrmia
- Municipality: Nijemci

Area
  - Total: 11.1 km^{2} (4.3 sq mi)
- Elevation: 83 m (272 ft)

Population (2021)
  - Total: 419
  - Density: 37.7/km^{2} (97.8/sq mi)
- Time zone: UTC+1 (CET)
  - Summer (DST): UTC+2 (CEST)
- Vehicle registration: VK

Đeletovci (Hungarian: Gyelétfalva) is a village in the municipality of Nijemci within the Vukovar-Syrmia County, Croatia. It had a population of 511 people in the 2011 census. The village is located on the Zagreb-Belgrade Railway and the D57 road.

The village is best known for oil and natural gas fields located in the vicinity owned by INA. The village is inhabited mostly Catholic Croats.

== Name ==
The name of the village in Croatian is plural.

== History ==
Following Ottoman retreat from the region, the Lordship of Vukovar was established, and the village became part of its domain.

In September 1982, oil was discovered in the village marking the second successful well in eastern Slavonia that year, following a find near Ilača in January of that year.

In November 1984, three new oil fields were opened near Đeletovci, Privlaka-Sremske Laze and Ilača. The opening ceremony was attended by senior Yugoslav and Croatian officials, including Branko Mamula, Mika Špiljak and Jakša Petrić. By the end of that year, the newly established fields were expected to produce 15,000 tons of crude oil, while from 1985 onward annual output from 29 wells was projected at around 90,000 tons.

Đeletovci was occupied by Yugoslav People's Army and by Republic of Serbian Krajina forces on October 1, 1991.

During the Croatian War of Independence, the Đeletovci oil field, one of Croatia’s largest sources of crude oil, was seized by Serb forces. Despite a strict regime of International sanctions against Serbia and Montenegro intended to cut off Serbia’s oil supplies, crude oil from the occupied field continued to be extracted and transported to refineries in Serbia. Contemporary estimates suggested that around 200 to 250 tons of oil were being pumped daily in 1993, representing an annual loss of nearly 100,000 tons. Croatian authorities lodged repeated protests with UNPROFOR Russian peacekeeping forces in the Sector East regarding what they described as the looting of national resources, but no effective measures were taken to halt the exploitation.

During the war, the Scorpions paramilitary controlled the village and remained there until 1996 when the United Nations Transitional Administration for Eastern Slavonia, Baranja and Western Sirmium took control of the area. In 1998, the area was reintegrated into the Republic of Croatia. During the war, Serb forces evicted 900 inhabitants of the village. By 2011 there were 511 people in the village.

== Culture ==
The village has a cultural association KUD Grančica. The association was founded in 1965.

== See also ==
- Đeletovci railway station
