= Sredanci =

- Village
- Interactive map of Sredanci
- Location of Sredanci in Croatia
- Coordinates: 45°09′15″N 18°17′09″E
- Country: Croatia
- County: Brod-Posavina
- Municipality: Donji Andrijevci

Area
  - Total: 7.8 km^{2} (3.0 sq mi)

Population (2021)
  - Total: 268
  - Density: 34/km^{2} (89/sq mi)
- Postal code: 35214 Donji Andrijevci
- Vehicle registration: SB

Sredanci is a village in the Donji Andrijevci municipality of the Brod-Posavina County in Croatia.

In the 2011 census, it had a population of 322, and 268 in the 2021 census.

The village is the eponym for the Sredanci interchange of the A3 and A5 motorways, located to the southeast of the village.
