= Tovarnik railway station =

Railway station in Tovarnik, Croatia

Coordinates: 45°9′20″N 19°8′55″E

Tovarnik
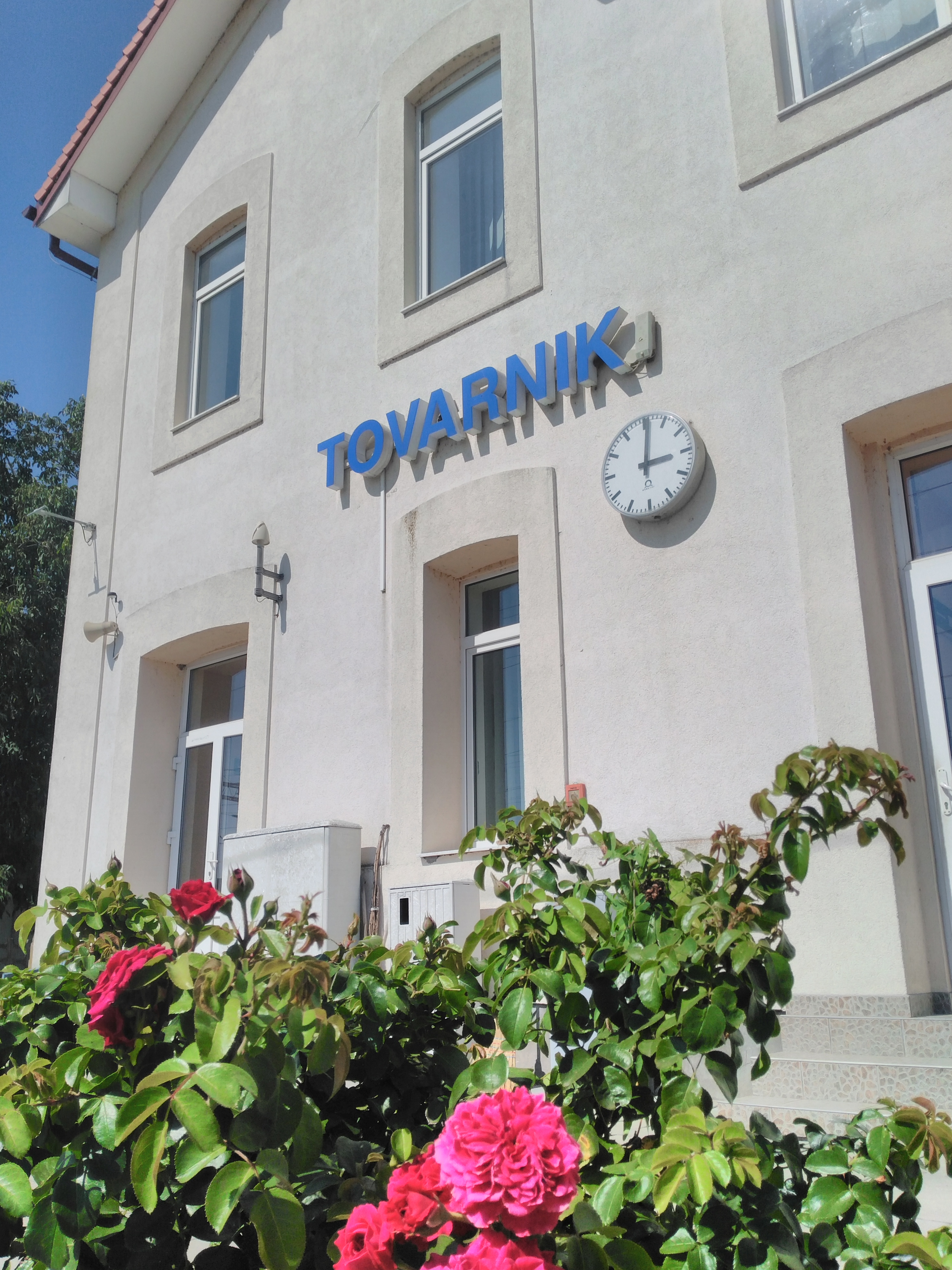

General information
- Location: Croatia
- Platforms: 2
- Tracks: 5
Location

Tovarnik railway station (Croatian: Željeznički kolodvor Tovarnik) is a railway station on Novska–Tovarnik railway. It is located in Tovarnik, Croatia. Railway continues to Đeletovci to the west and to Šid to the east. Tovarnik railway station consists of 5 railway tracks.

== Gallery ==
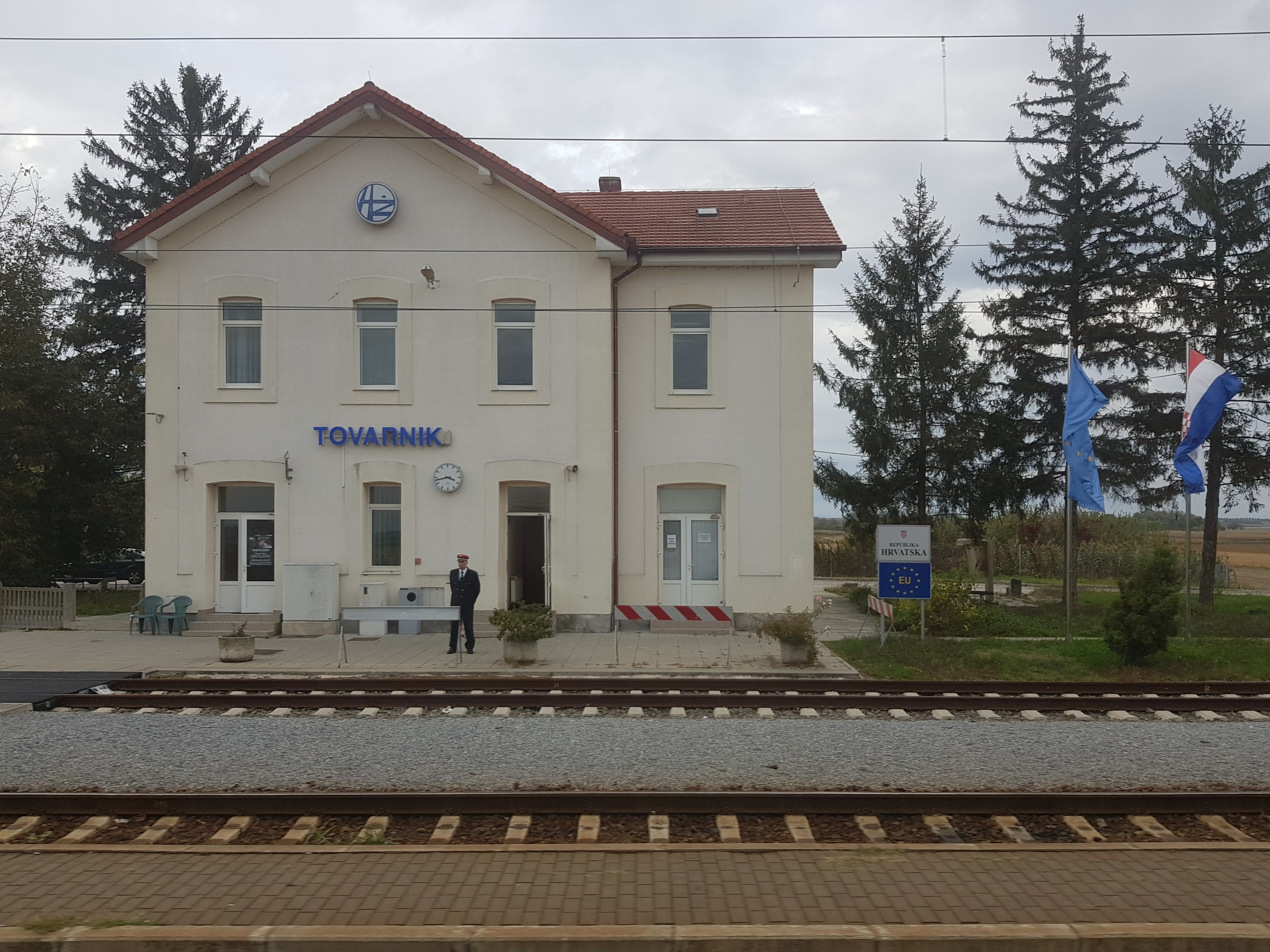
Railway station building view from train

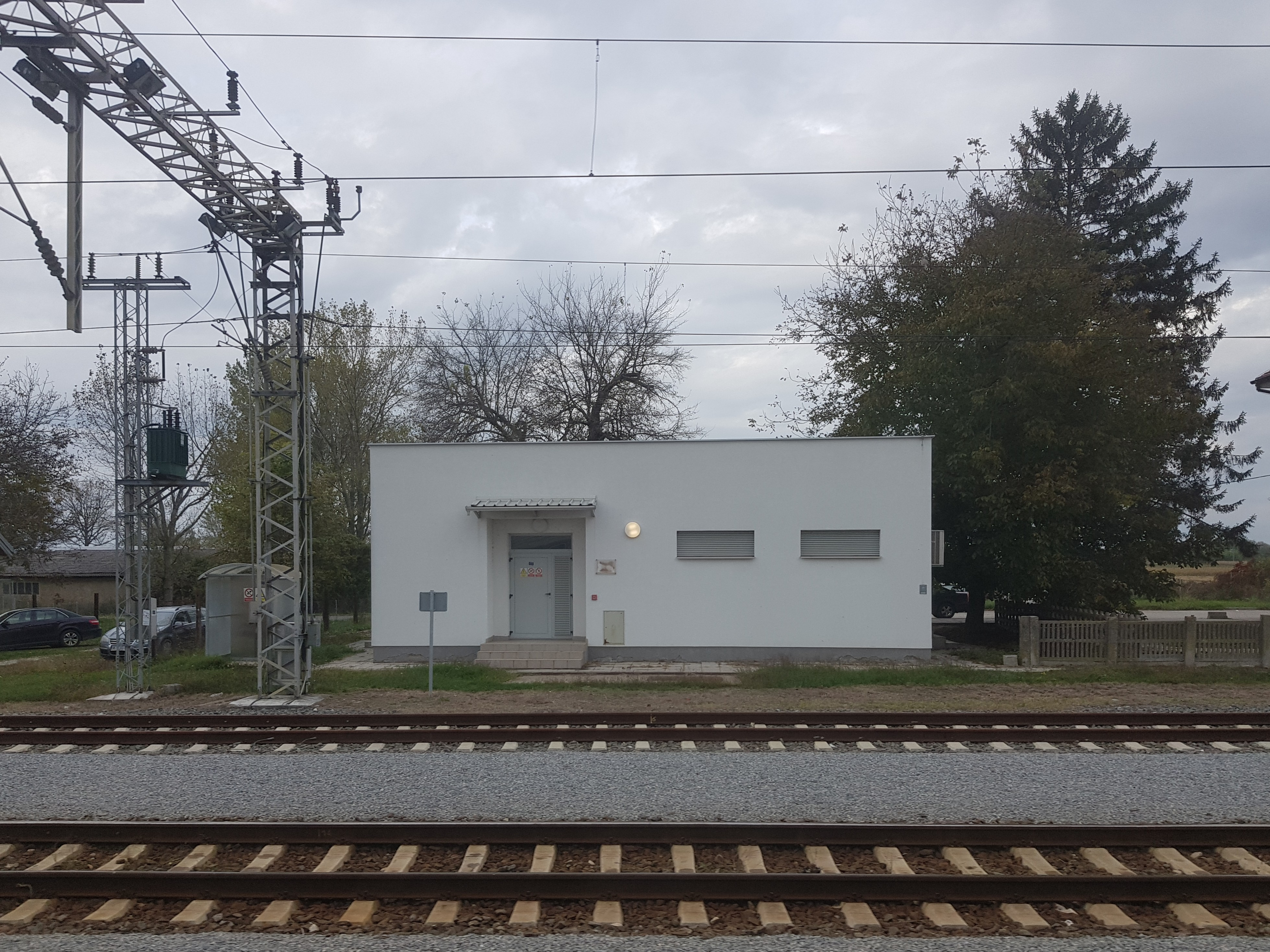
Border police facility

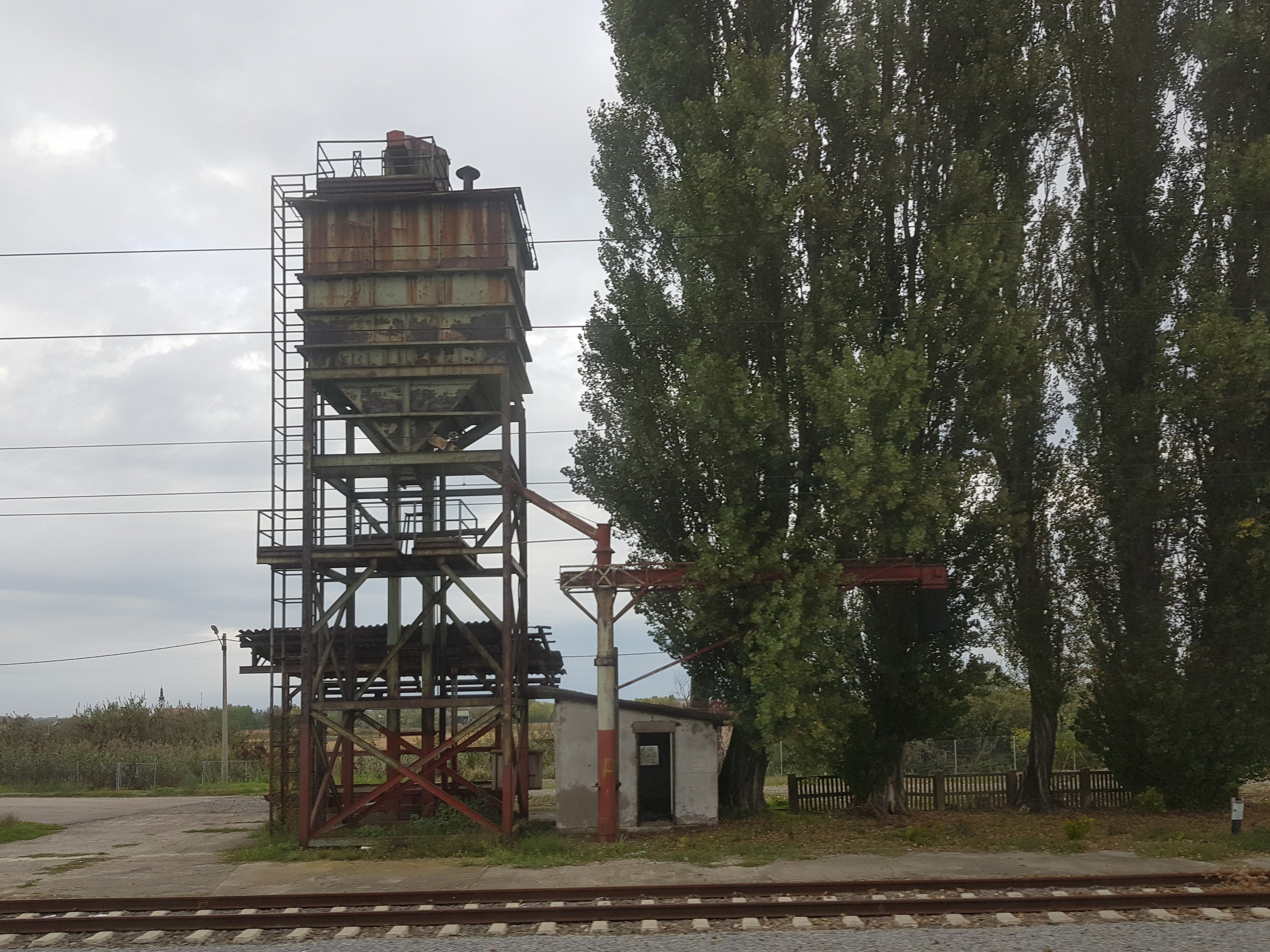
Agricultural silo (grain) construction

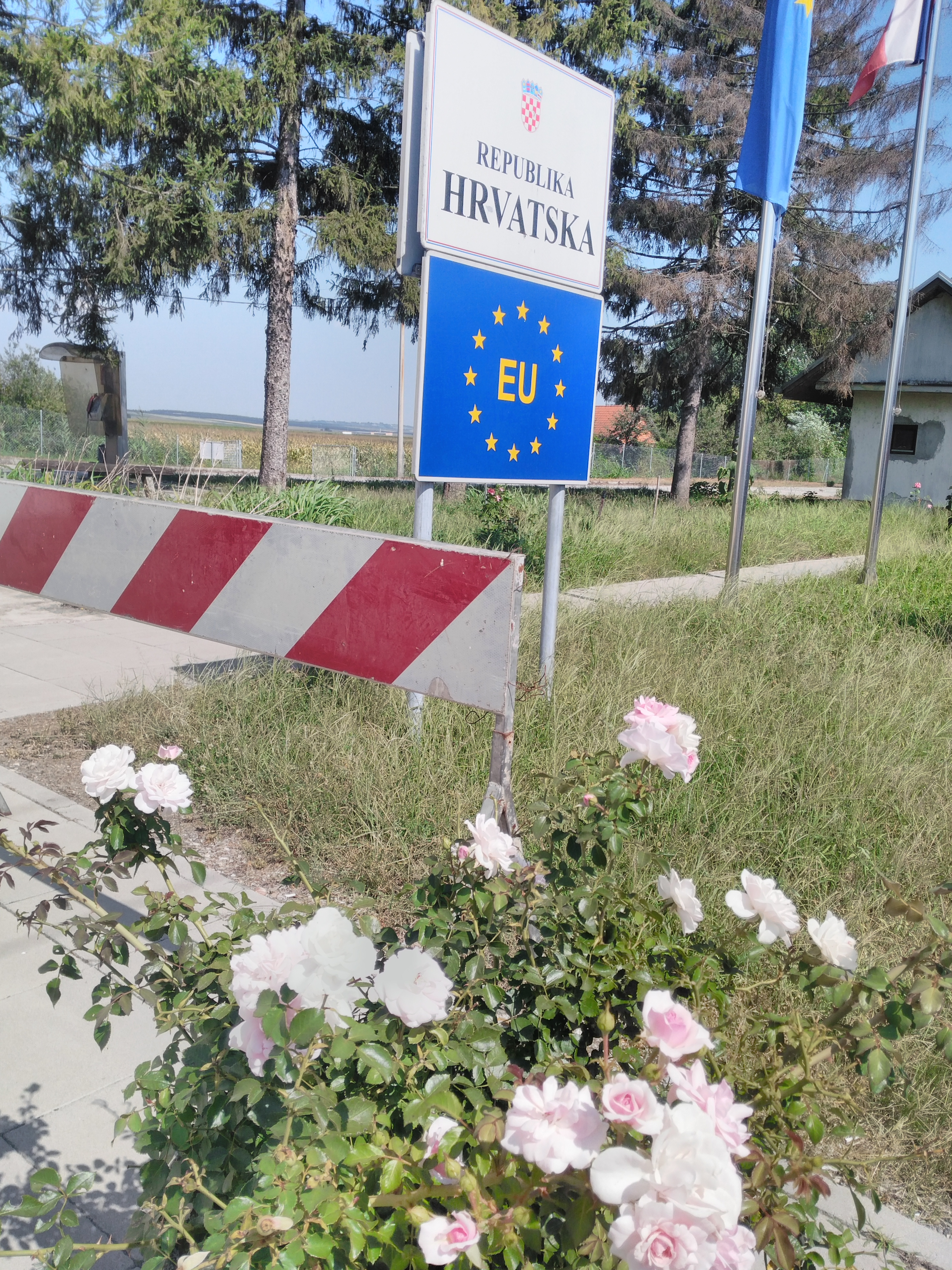
Border-crossing sign on the station

== See also ==
- Croatian Railways
- Zagreb–Belgrade railway

Preceding station	Tovarnik railway station	Following station
Ilača	M104 railway (Croatia); Novska to Tovarnik route	Šid (Serbia)
