= Vinkovci railway station =

Railway station in Croatia

Vinkovci
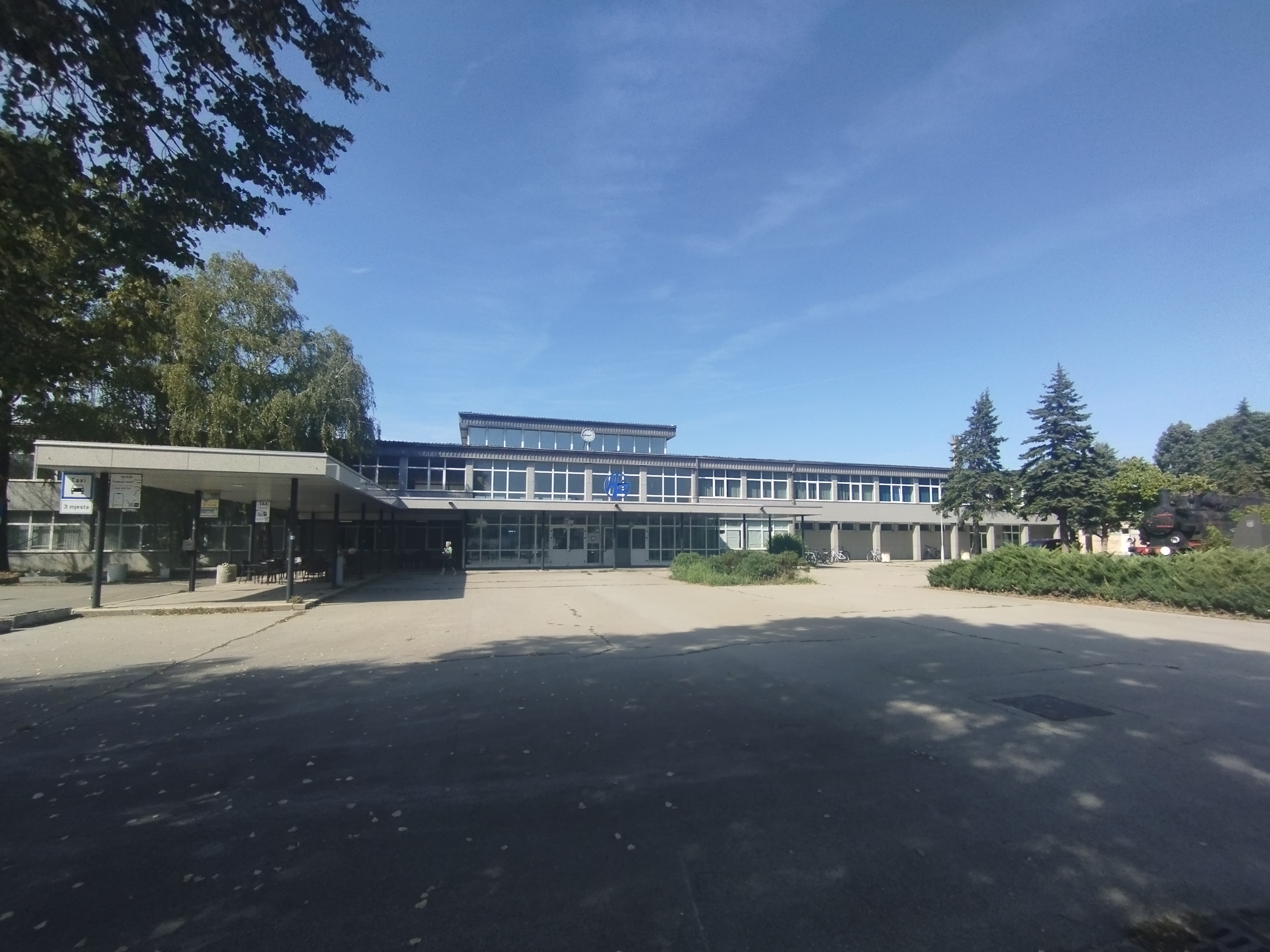
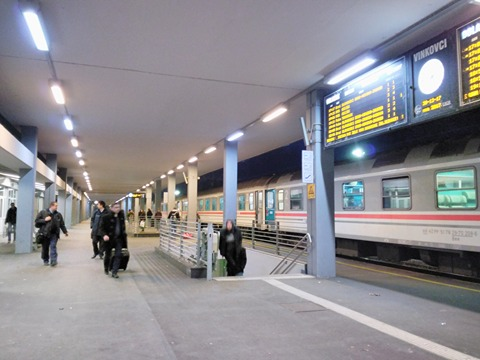
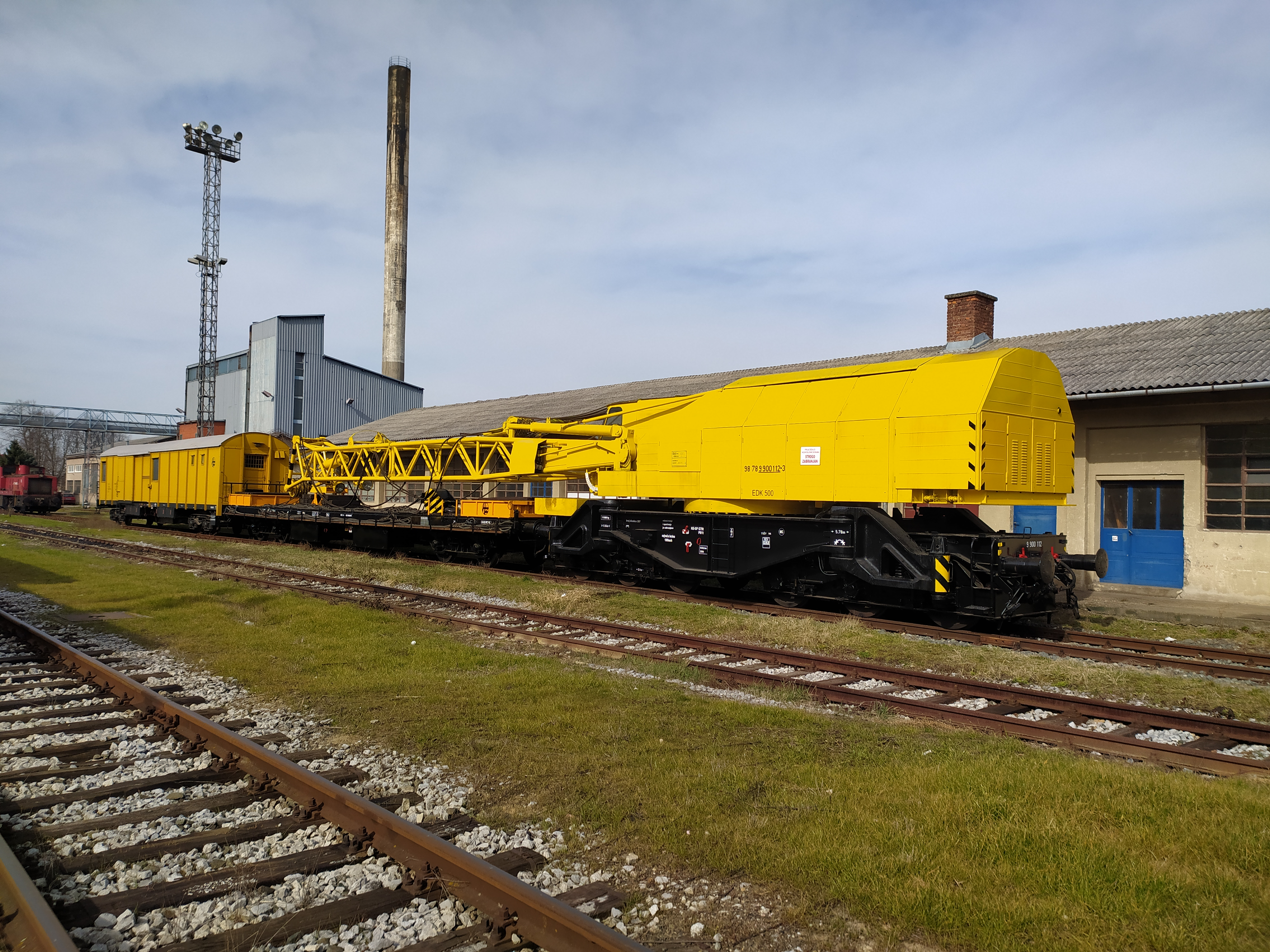
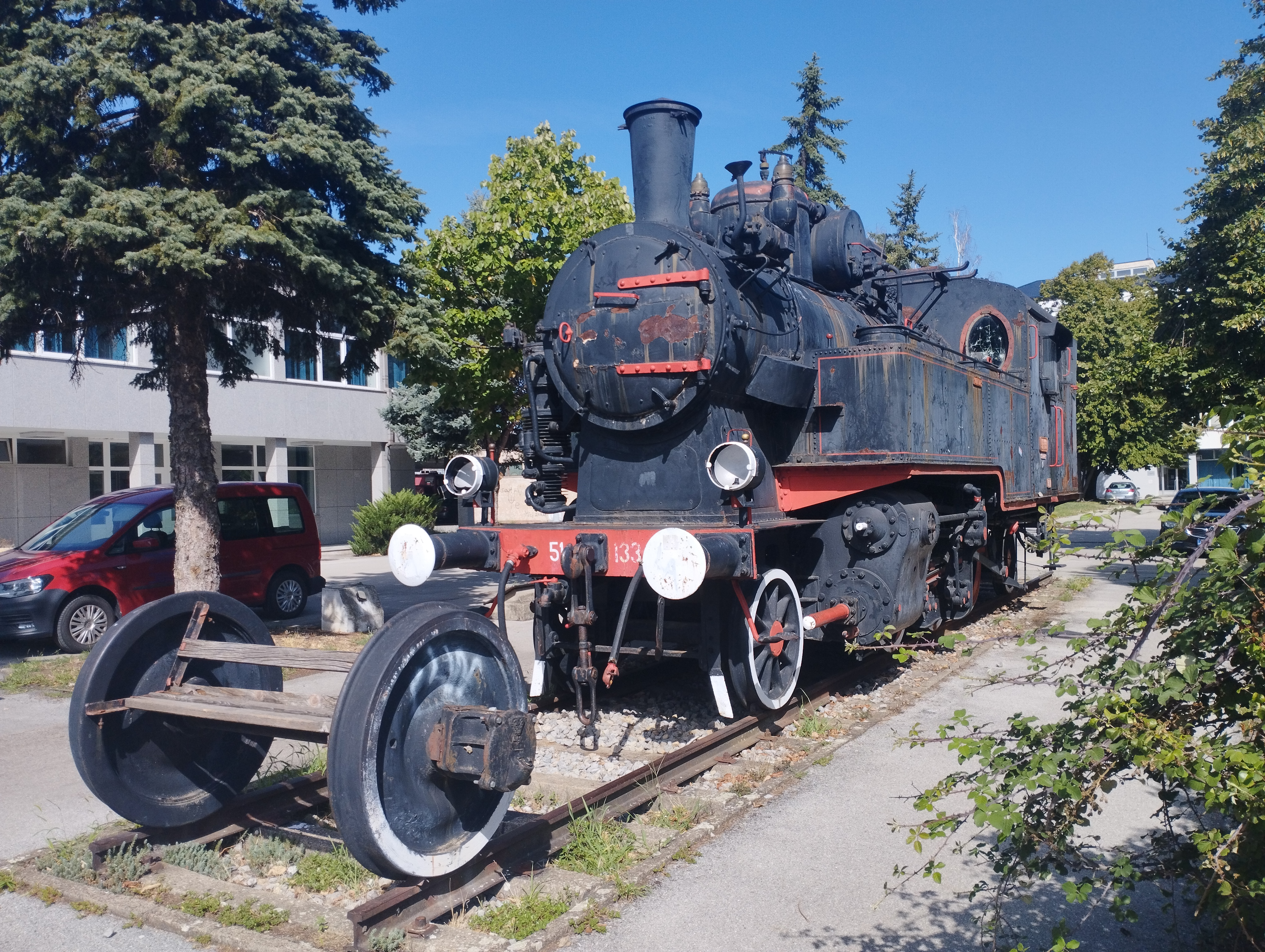
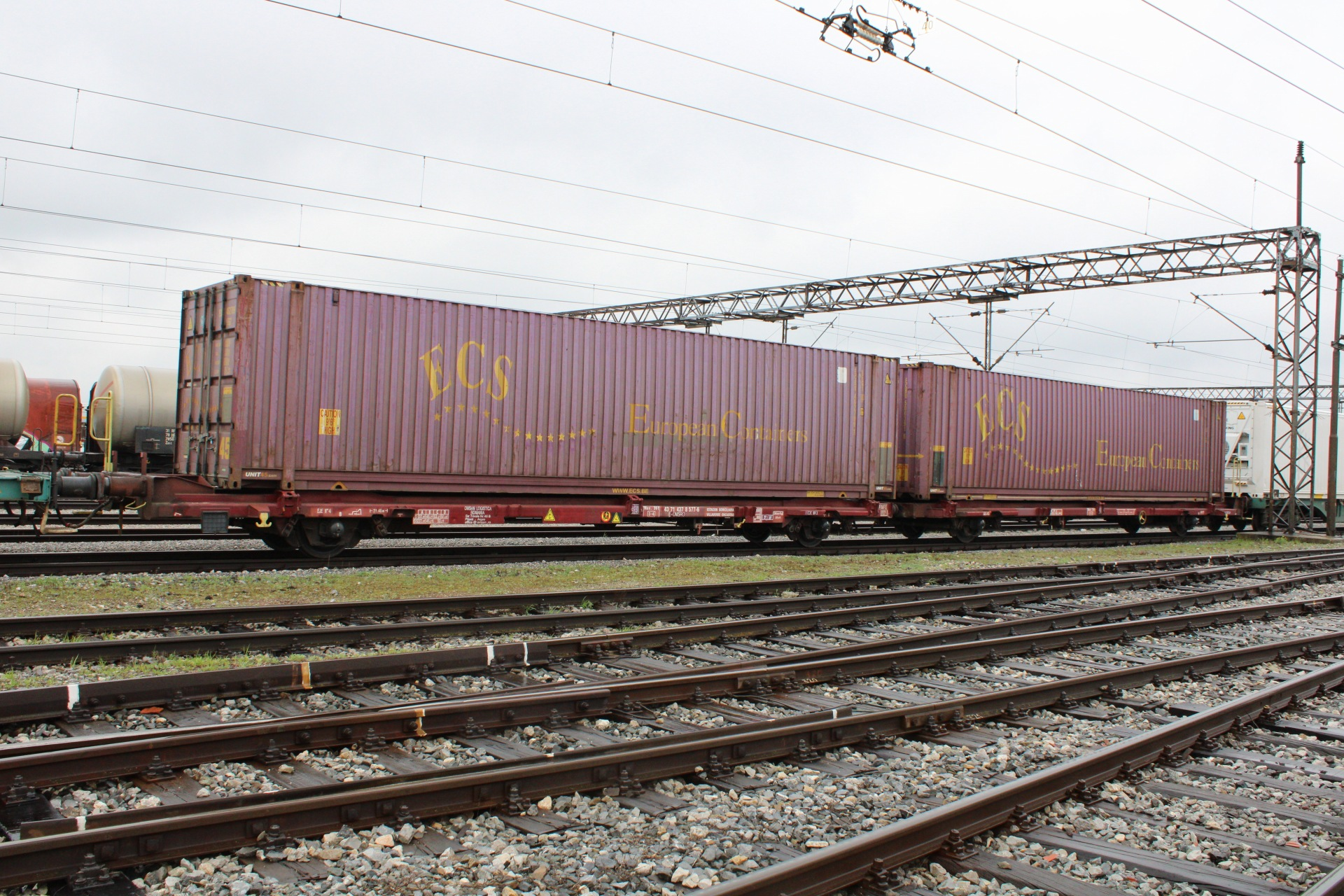
- Vinkovci railway station

General information
- Location: Trg kralja Tomislava 3 Croatia
- Coordinates: 45°18′00″N 18°48′07″E
- Owner: Croatian Railways
- Lines: M104 (Zagreb–Belgrade); M601; R105; L208; L209
- Tracks: 15
Location

Vinkovci railway station (Croatian: Željeznički kolodvor Vinkovci) is the railway station located in Vinkovci, on the Novska–Tovarnik railway. The railway continues to Ivankovo to the west, to Jankovci to the east, to Otok to the southeast, to Andrijaševci to the southwest, to Osijek to the northwest, and to Vukovar–Borovo Naselje to the northeast. Vinkovci railway station consists of 15 railway tracks.

== History ==
The first scheduled train arrived at Vinkovci train station on 23 November 1878, on the Dalj–Vinkovci–Slavonski Brod route. By 1910, six railway lines connected Vinkovci to Zagreb, Županja, Brčko, Belgrade, Vukovar and Osijek.

On 19 August 1942, during World War II in Yugoslavia, approximately 1,000 Jews from Syrmia (mainly from Ilok, Vukovar, Županja, Sremska Mitrovica, Ruma, Šid and Stara Pazova) then under the control of the Independent State of Croatia, were deported from the Vinkovci railway station to the Auschwitz concentration camp. The station served as a key transit centre for German forces towards occupied Greece. It was therefore targeted and bombed several times by Allied air forces, which also caused collateral damage to the town of Vinkovci.

Between 1945 and 1948, a so-called “war railway” bypass line was secretly built around Vinkovci, due to concerns about potential Soviet Union military action after the Tito–Stalin split. In November 1951, a major railway accident near Vinkovci claimed the lives of 17 political prisoners being transported to the Goli Otok prison camp. A similar accident at the same location had occurred about six months earlier, killing over 30 people.

During the second half of the 20th century, Vinkovci railway station developed into one of the most important railway hubs in the Socialist Federal Republic of Yugoslavia and the wider Balkans. By the late 1980s it was regarded as the largest junction in the country and among the busiest in Europe, employing around 3,000 workers at the station and more than 3,600 in the wider railway system of the area. At its peak, up to 360 trains passed through the station daily, approximately one every four minutes, while annual passenger traffic reached about 18 million, or nearly 50,000 people per day. The freight yard, expanded in 1948 with two classification yards and some 60 kilometres of track, handled as many as 4,500 to 5,000 wagons daily.

The Croatian War of Independence in the 1990s and subsequent political and economic changes sharply reduced traffic. In late June of 1996, railway traffic between Vinkovci railway station and Mirkovci railway station was re-established after being suspended for more than five years during the war. The inaugural train from Vinkovci was accompanied by UNTAES administrator Jacques Paul Klein.

The 18,7 kilometres long Vinkovci–Vukovar railway line was fully renovated and electrified by December of 2024 with an investment of €61 million. The project was mostly financed by European Union.

== See also ==
- Croatian Railways
- Zagreb–Belgrade railway
