= Novska railway station =

Railway station in Croatia

Coordinates: 45°19′32″N 16°58′54″E

Novska
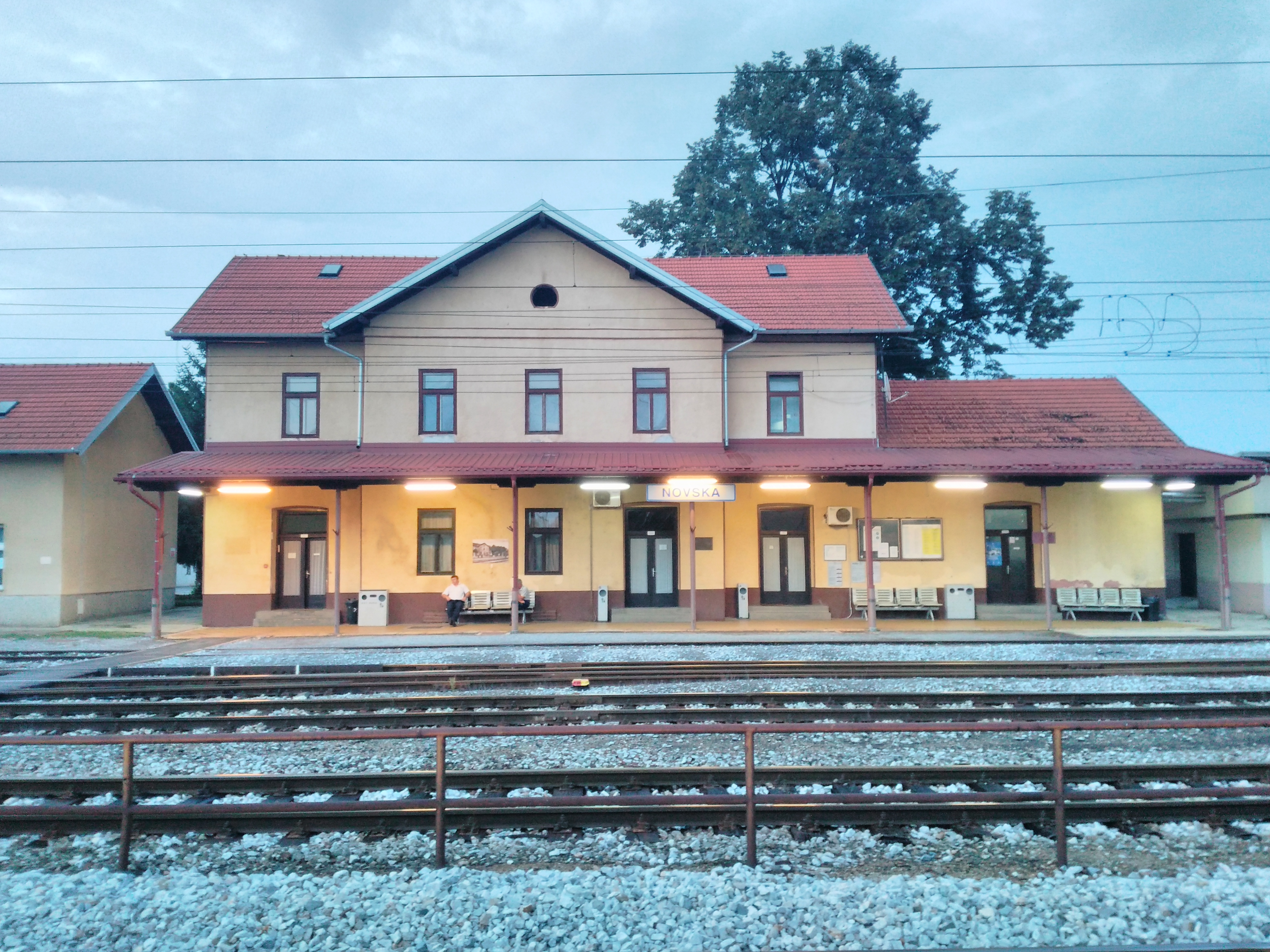

General information
- Location: Croatia
- Tracks: 18
Location

Novska railway station (Croatian: Željeznički kolodvor Novska) is a railway station on in Novska, Croatia. The station connects the Dugo Selo–Novska railway towards Zagreb, Novska–Tovarnik railway towards Vinkovci and Serbia, and Zagreb–Sisak–Novska railway towards Sisak and Zagreb. The railway station consists of 18 railway tracks.

== See also ==
- Croatian Railways
- Zagreb–Belgrade railway
