= M104 railway (Croatia) =

Railway line in Croatia

Novska–Tovarnik railway
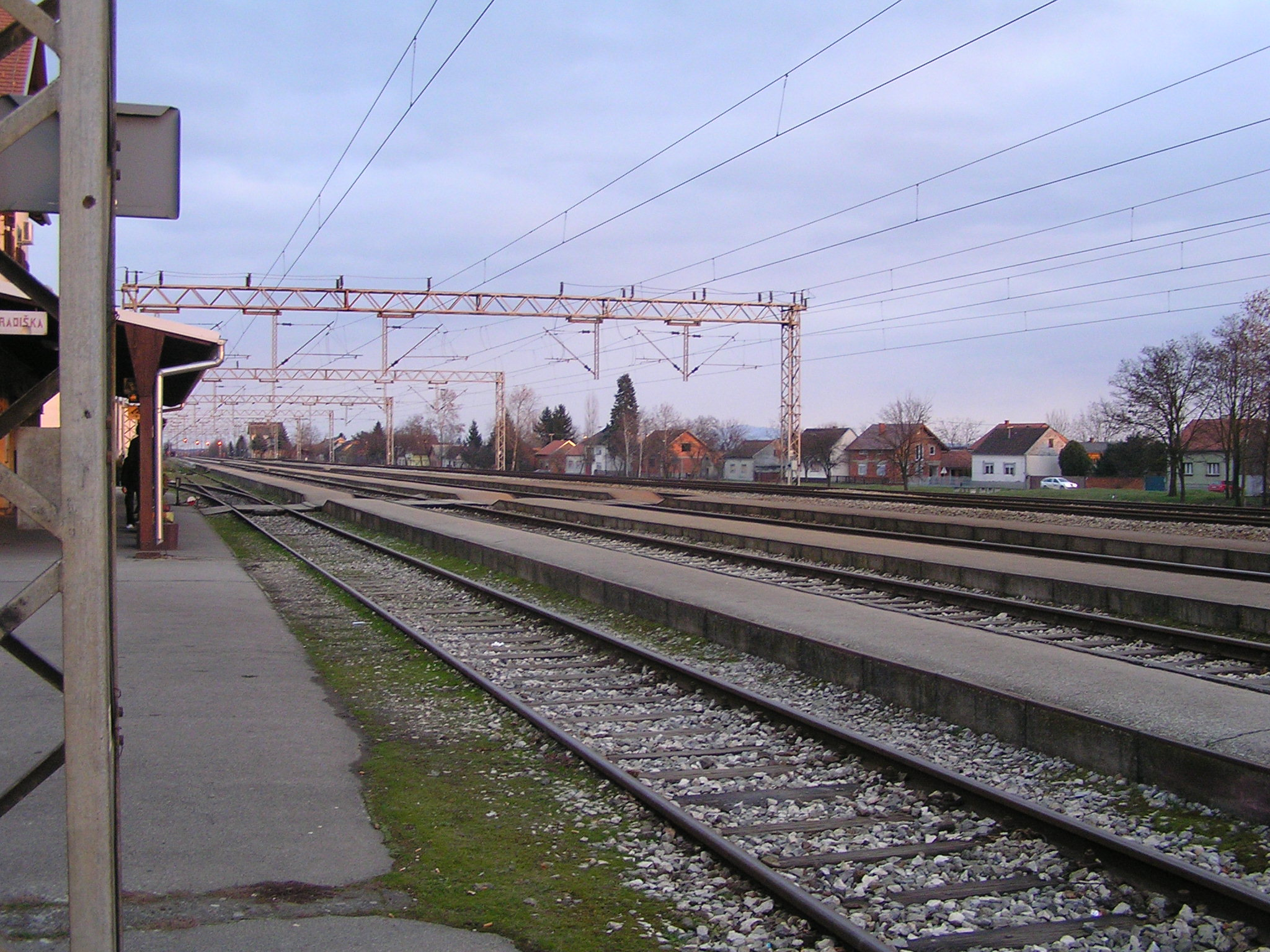
- Sunset at Nova Gradiška station

Technical
- Line length: 185.4 km (115.2 mi)
- Track gauge: 1435 mm
- Electrification: 25 kV 50 Hz AC
- Operating speed: 160 km/h (99.4 mph) max.

The Novska–Tovarnik railway (Croatian: Pruga Novska-Tovarnik), officially designated as the M104 railway, is a 185.4-kilometre (115.2 mi) long railway line in Croatia that connects Novska to the Serbian railway network east of Tovarnik, continuing to the city of Belgrade. It is electrified double-track railway. Its route follows the Sava river valley making it the primary railway line of Slavonia. It is an integral part of railway Pan-European Corridor X running from Salzburg and Ljubljana towards Skopje and Thessaloniki. It is electrified and double-tracked. Until 2014, the railway was classified as M105.

== History ==
It was the route of the Orient Express service from 1919 to 1977.

As part of the Zagreb–Belgrade railway, electrification was finished in 1970. It was the first fully electrified line in Croatia with 25 kV 50 AC system (Zagreb-Rijeka was electrified earlier, but with older 3 kV DC system).

== Reconstruction of the Vinkovci - Tovarnik section (2008 - 2012) ==
From 2008 to 2011, the section of the track between stations Vinkovci and Tovarnik was reconstructed.

The reconstruction of the section Vinkovci - Tovarnik - state border was the first project in Croatia that was financed from the pre-accession funds of the European Union and the first in which investments in railway infrastructure were co-financed from EU funds. It is also the largest infrastructure project financed by the pre-accession aid model, both in financial and physical terms. The completion of the works was solemnly celebrated on January 19, 2012.

The subject of the project was the section on the international corridor in the east of Croatia, from Vinkovci to Tovarnik, that is on a route 33.48 km long. Since it is a two-track railway, 67 kilometers of tracks were renewed. The axle load allowed on this part of the corridor is now 22.5 tons per axle and 8.0 tons per meter of length. The maximum operating speed on the section was raised from 50 to 160 km/h following the end of the reconstruction.

As part of the reconstruction of the section Vinkovci - Tovarnik - state border with Serbia, works were carried out in stations and stops, on tracks and railway crossings, and a new system of traffic signaling and traffic management was installed.

Seven existing stations were modernized, where new platform areas were built with all the necessary infrastructure, such as ramps for disabled people, platform canopies, lighting, parking areas and more. Two stations (Jankovci and Đeletovci) were reconstructed, and two new stops were built as part of their reconstruction.

== Reconstruction of the Novska - Okučani section (2012 - 2016) ==
From 2012 to 2016, section of the track between stations Novska (excluded) and Okučani was reconstructed.After the reconstruction, the maximum permitted operating speed for trains on the section was raised to 160 km/h.

The project included following:

- renovation of the double-track railway (upper and lower track structure) between Okučani and Novska (about 16.8 km)
- renovation of Okučani station (installation of the new 55-cm high passenger platforms, canopies, complete rehabilitation of the station building, renovation of the outdoor lighting system etc.)
- renovation of the Rajić stop (installation of new 55-cm high passenger platforms, canopies and renovation of the outdoor lighting system)
- modernization of the electrification system
- renovation of signal-security and telecommunication devices
- modernization of the railway crossings along the route

== Gallery ==
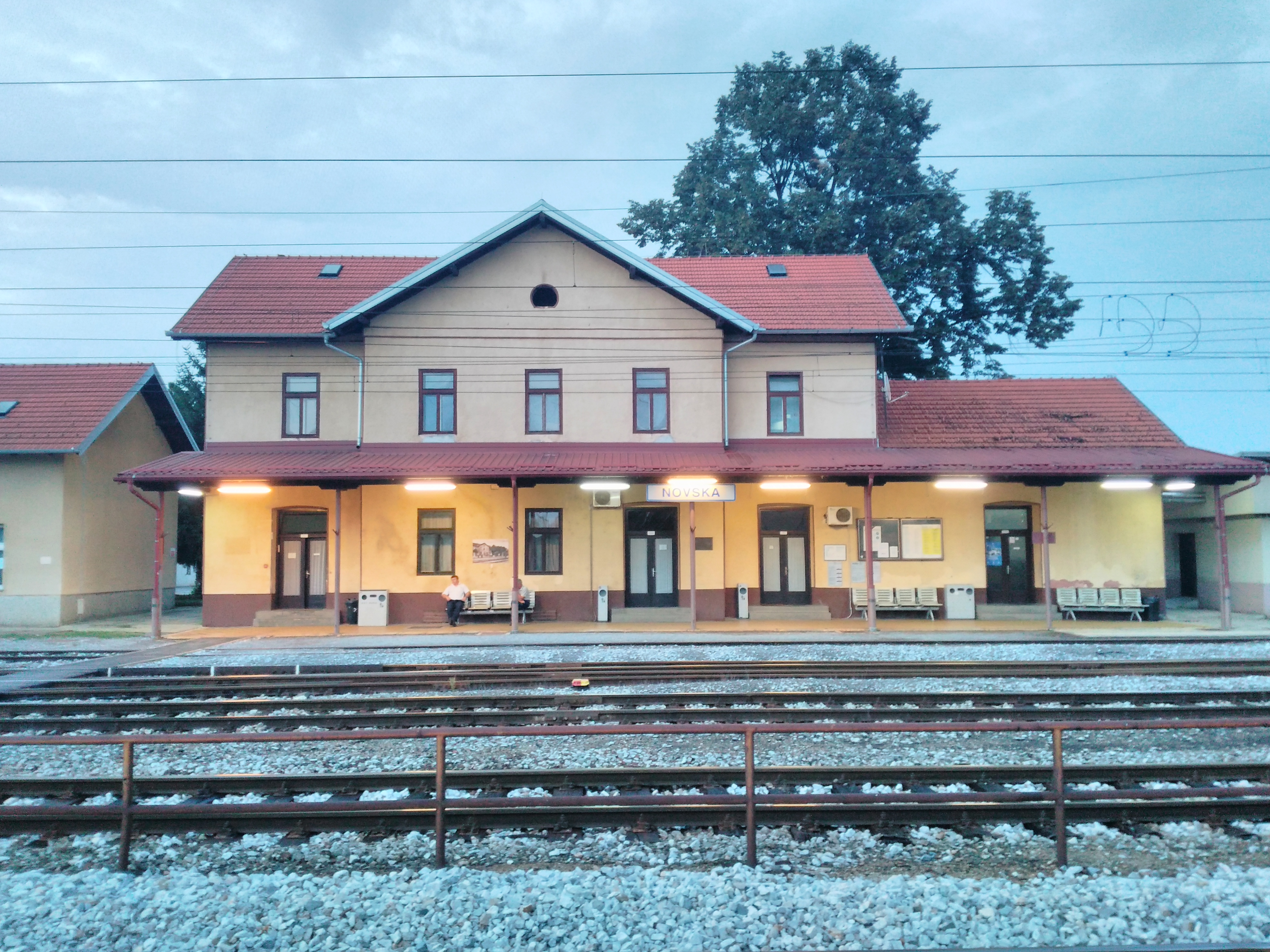
Novska railway station

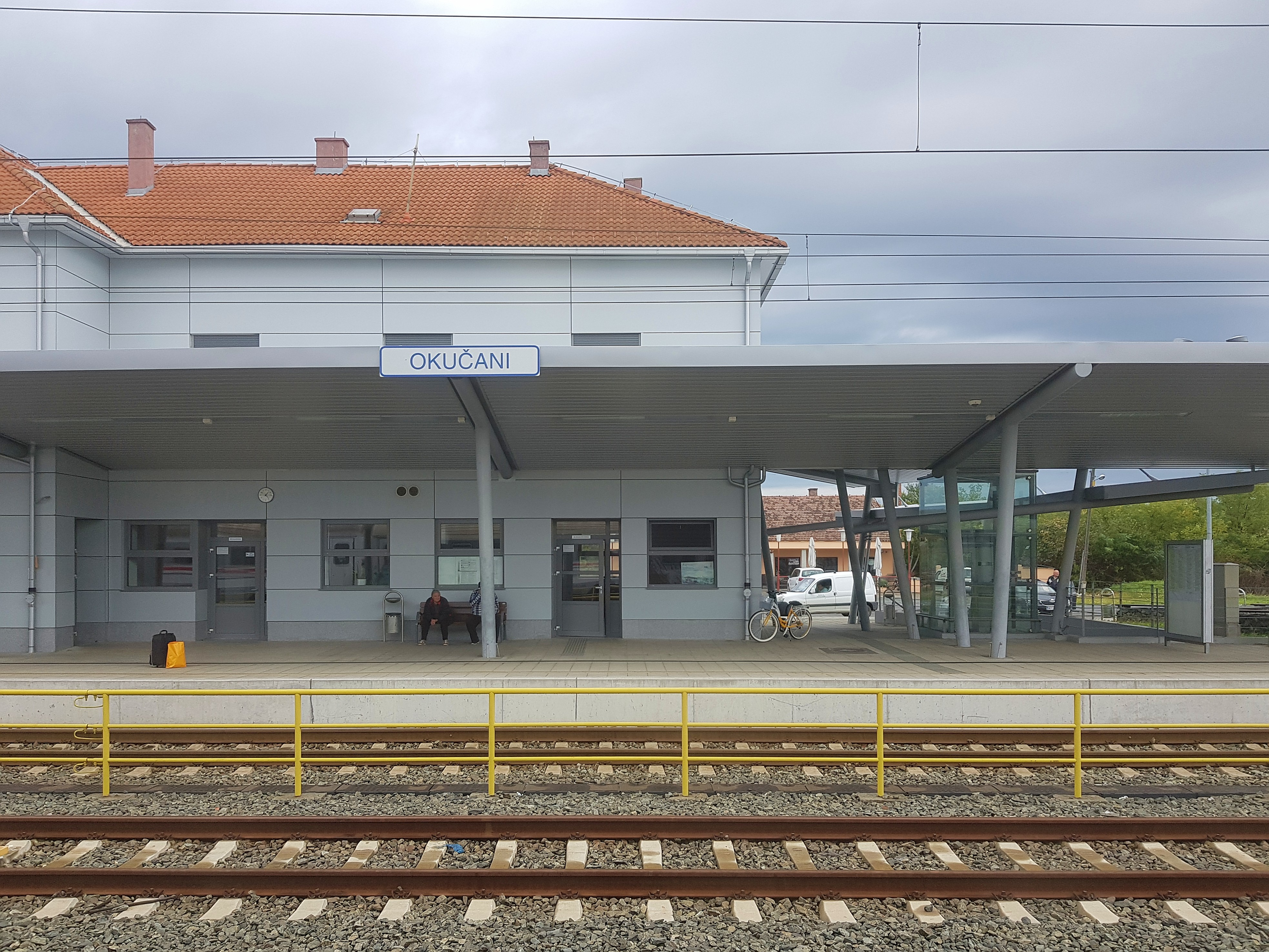
Okučani railway station

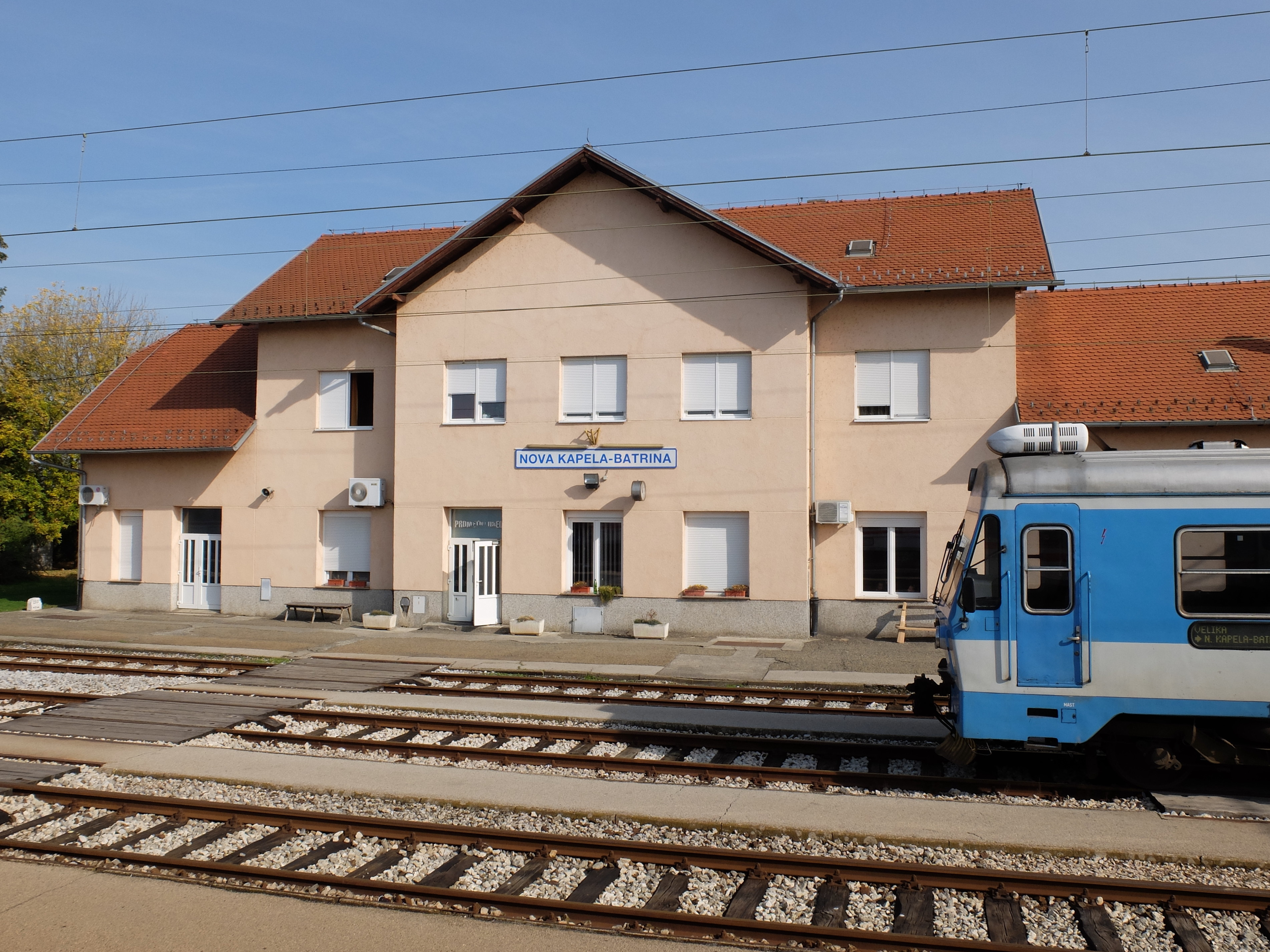
Nova Kapela–Batrina railway station

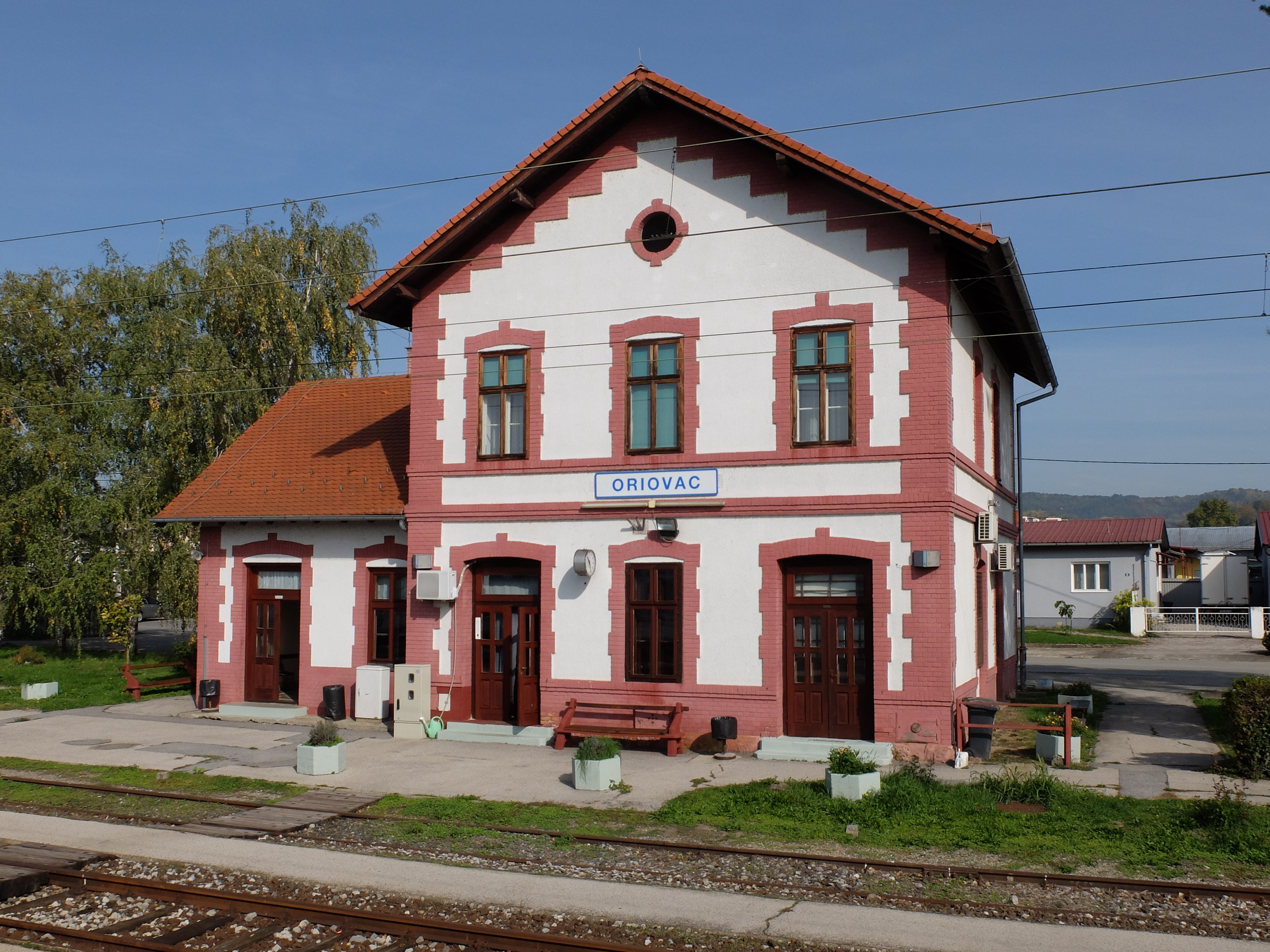
Oriovac railway station

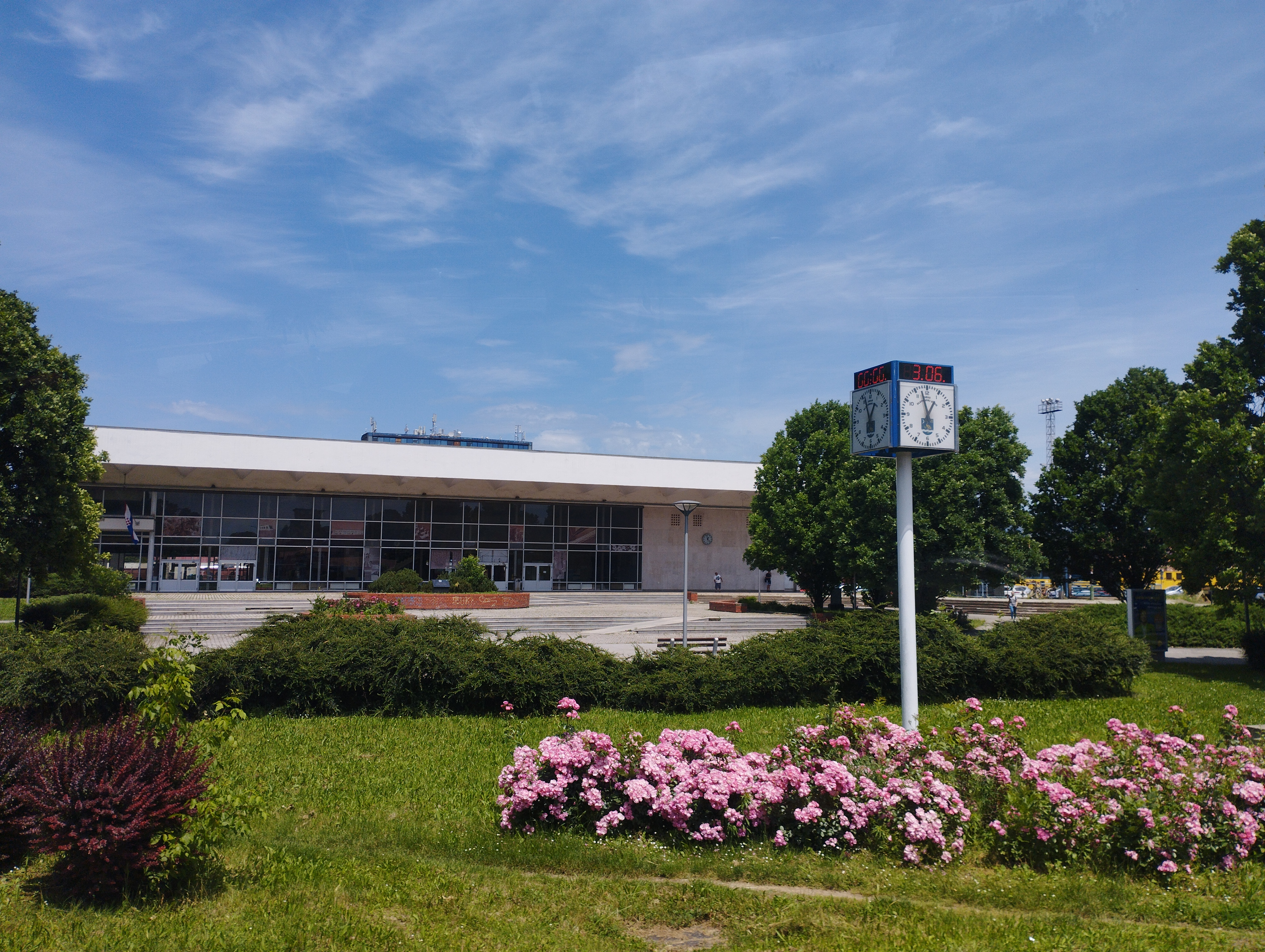
Slavonski Brod railway station

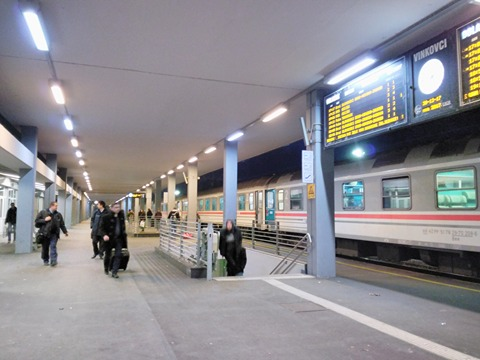
Vinkovci railway station

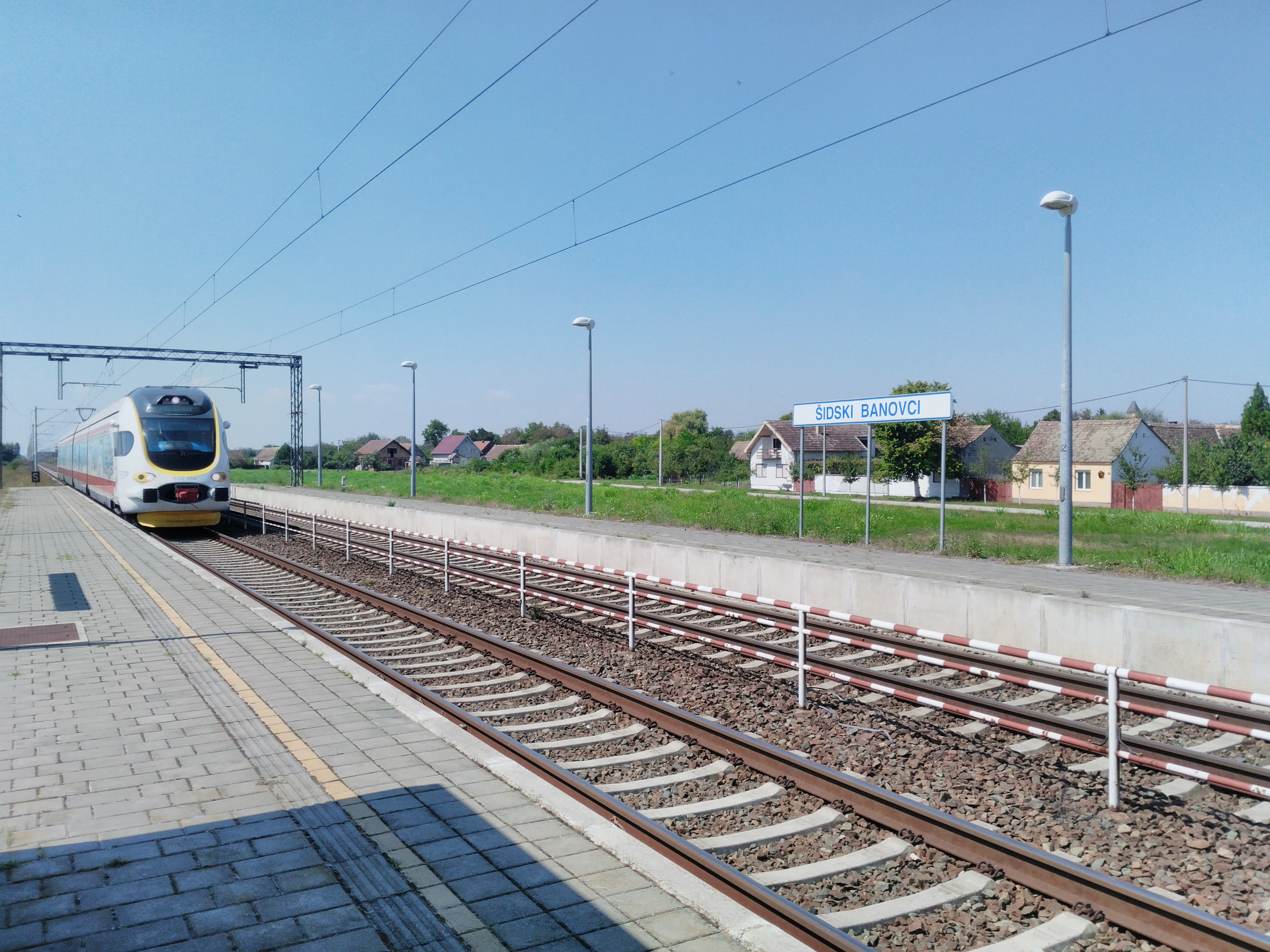
Šidski Banovci railway station

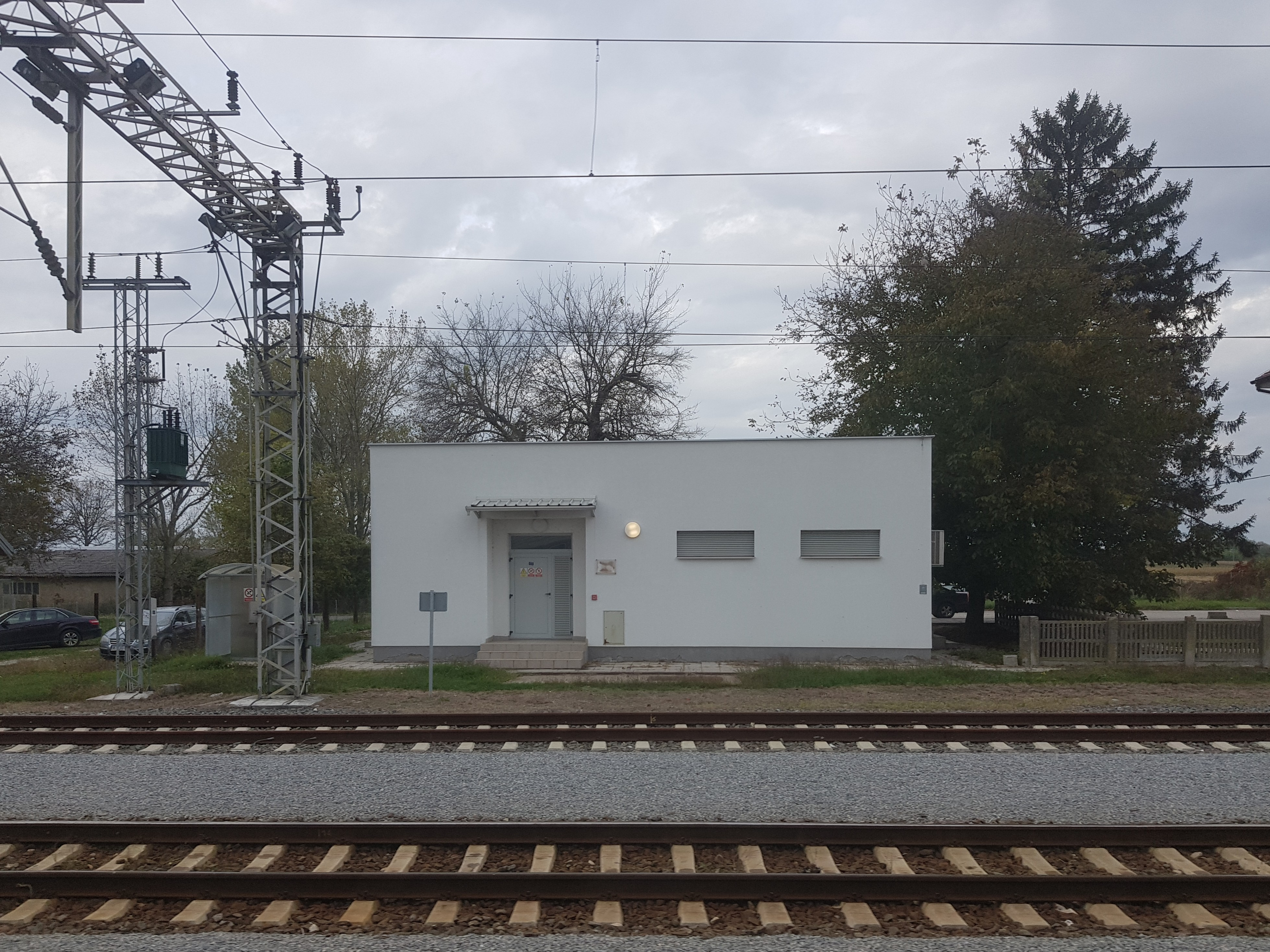
Border facility at the Tovarnik railway station

== See also ==
- List of railways in Croatia
