= Zagreb–Belgrade railway =

Railway in Serbia and Croatia

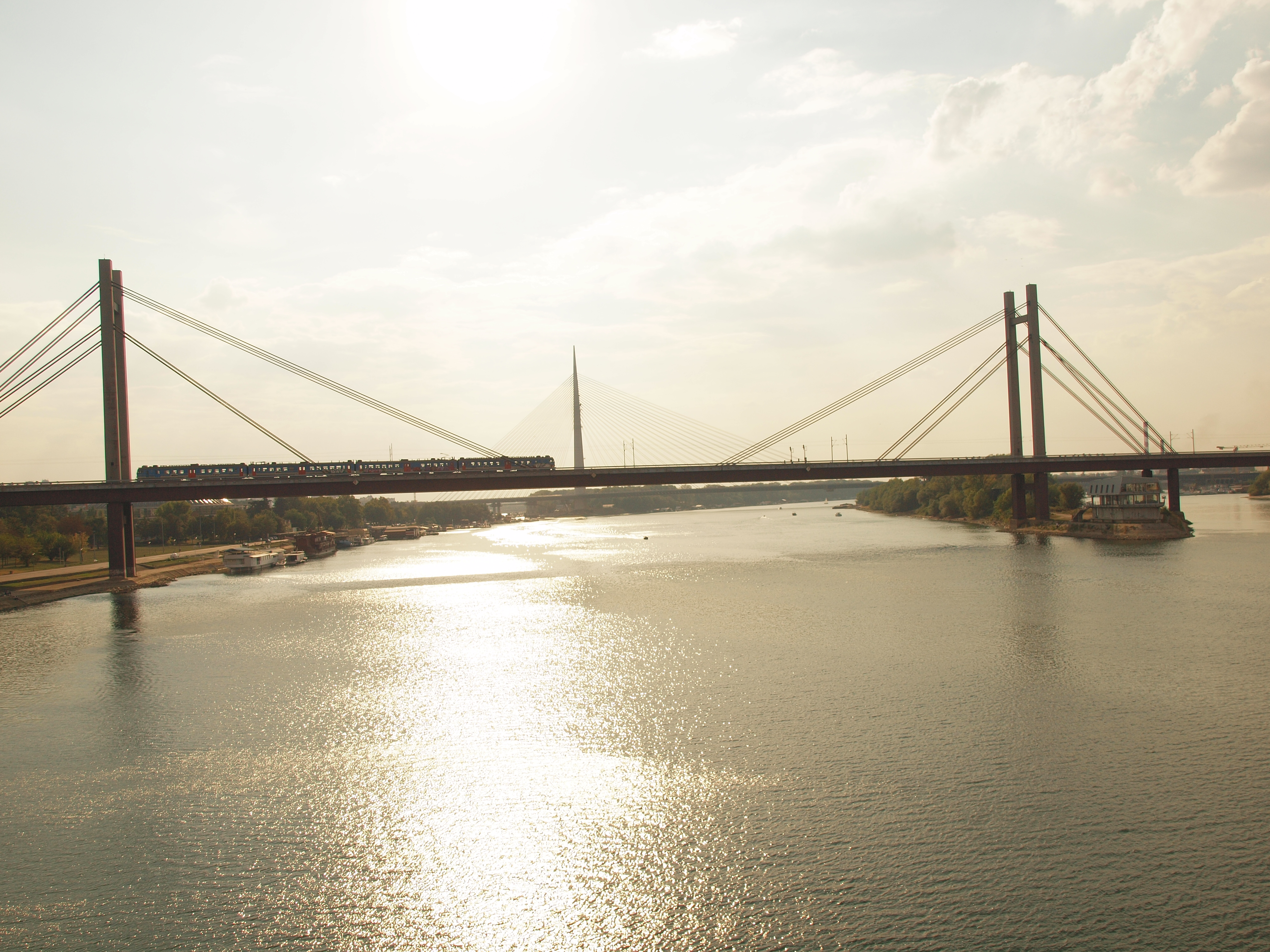
New Railway Bridge in Belgrade, Serbia

The Zagreb–Belgrade railway (Croatian: Pruga Zagreb-Beograd) was the Yugoslav Railways′ 412-kilometre (256 mi) long railway line connecting the cities of Zagreb and Belgrade in SR Croatia and SR Serbia, at the time of the SFR Yugoslavia.

It was the route of the Orient Express service from 1919 to 1977.

Electrification was finished in 1970. It was the first fully electrified line in Croatia with a 25 kV 50 AC system (Zagreb-Rijeka was electrified earlier, but with an older 3 kV DC system).

Since the breakup of Yugoslavia, it was split into the Zagreb-Tovarnik railway and the Belgrade–Šid railway, operated by Croatian Railways and Serbian Railways, respectively.

== See also ==
- Ljubljana-Zagreb railway
- Pan-European Corridor X
