= Slobodan Bajić Paja =

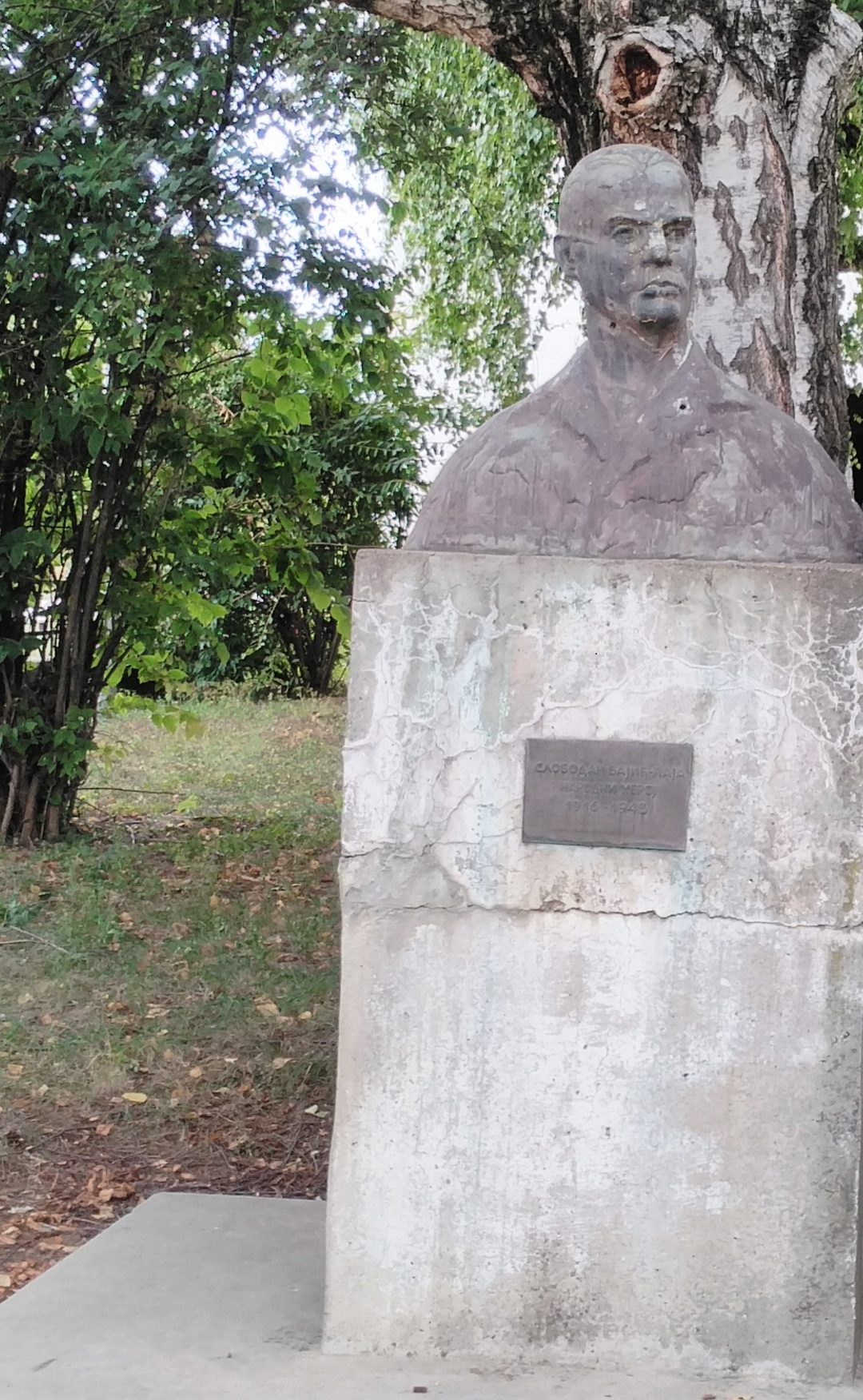
- Born: Slobodan Bajić; 26 June 1916; Banovci
- Died: 1943 (aged 27); Eastern Bosnia
- Resting place: unknown (Kalesija until April 1996)
- Citizenship: Yugoslav
- Occupations: Partisan fighter, author of the manifestos
- Awards: Order of the People's Hero

Slobodan Bajić Paja (1916–1943)) was a Yugoslav Partisan and recipient of the People's Hero of Yugoslavia. He was an important leader of the Partisans in World War II in Syrmia. He was killed in battle against the Nazis in Eastern Bosnia.

== Early life ==
Slobodan Bajić Paja was born in the village of Banovci in Croatia where he lived until age six. He was the son of a local Orthodox priest in St. Petka's Church. From 1922, he lived in Pećinci in Serbia, where his father was transferred. He graduated from high school in Sremski Karlovci. Slobodan started participating in the work of the Communist Party of Yugoslavia while still in high school but he formally joined the party during his studies at the University of Belgrade Faculty of Philosophy in 1938.

== Legacy ==
Elementary Schools in Indija, Pećinci, Novi Karlovci, Brestač, Donji Tovarnik, and Sremska Mitrovica bear his name. He also has a city library named after him in Ruma.

Before the Croatian War of Independence, the school in Šidski Banovci also bore his name but the Croatian government decided to rename it afterwards. However, the bust of Slobodan Bajic Paja in front of the school remains, and one of the streets in the village still bears his name. Unfortunately, at the same time a monument to Slobodan Bajic Paji together with mausoleum of 33 anti-fascist partisans in Kalesija was destroyed and the bones were then confiscated and lost by local Bosniaks authorities four months after the end of the war in Bosnia. Although the Public Television of Bosnia and Herzegovina subsequently attempted to investigate the matter, competent investigative institutions in Tuzla refused to open a formal investigation.

== Honorific eponyms ==
- Croatia: Slobodan Bajić Paja Street, Banovci
- Serbia: Slobodan Bajić Paja Street, Pećinci
- Serbia: Elementary School Slobodan Bajić Paja in Novi Karlovci
- Serbia: Elementary School Slobodan Bajić Paja in Pećinci
- Serbia: Elementary School Slobodan Bajić Paja in Manđelos
- Serbia: Elementary School Slobodan Bajić Paja in Sremska Mitrovica
- Serbia: Public Library Slobodan Bajić Paja in Ruma

== See also ==
- Serbs of Croatia
- Banovci
- Pećinci
