= Church of the Holy Venerable Mother Parascheva =

Serbian Orthodox church in Banovci, Croatia

- Hram Svete prepodobne majke Paraskeve; Храм свете пеподобне мајке Параскеве
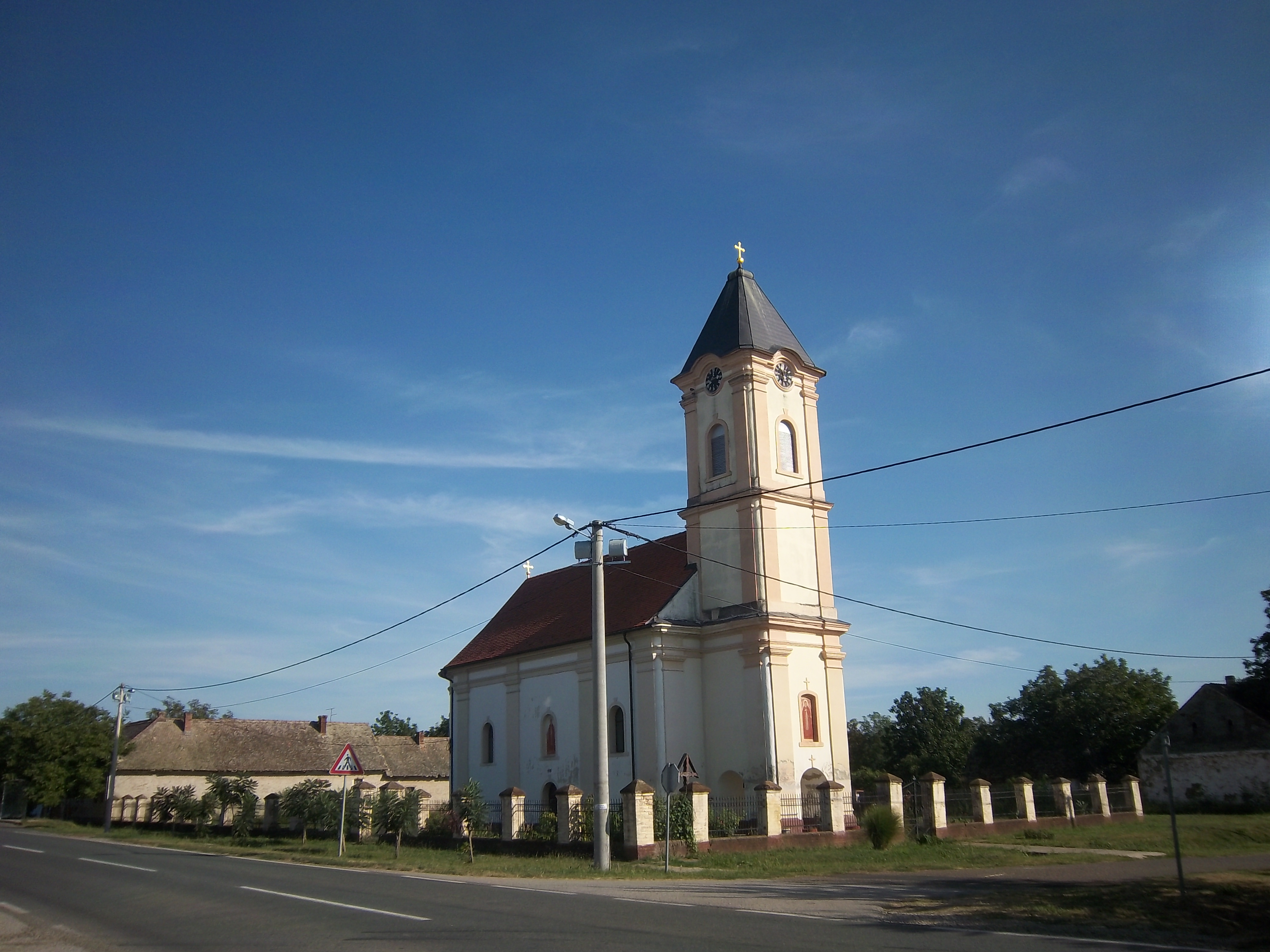
- St. Petka orthodox church
- Church of the Holy Venerable Mother Parascheva
- 45°11′04″N 19°03′56″E
- Location: Banovci, Croatia
- Country: Croatia
- Denomination: Serbian Orthodox

History
- Dedication: Parascheva of the Balkans

Architecture
- Style: Neoclassicism
- Years built: 1819

Administration
- Archdiocese: Eparchy of Srem

The Church of the Holy Venerable Mother Parascheva (Serbo-Croatian: Hram svete prepodobne majke Paraskeve, Serbian Cyrillic: Храм свете пеподобне мајке Параскеве) is a Serbian Orthodox church located in Banovci, Vukovar-Syrmia County, in eastern Croatia. Constructed in 1819, this neoclassical church is dedicated to Paraskeva of the Balkans.

The Church of the Holy Venerable Mother Parascheva falls under the jurisdiction of the Eparchy of Srem, headquartered in Sremski Karlovci in neighbouring Serbia. Within the Eparchy, the church is administratively part of the Šid region, whose ecclesiastical center is the Church of St. Nicholas in Šid. Due to the lack of a rectory in Banovci, most priests serving this parish reside in Šid.

== History ==
Originally built in 1818, this church, along with parishes in Tovarnik and Ilok, is among the few Serbian Orthodox churches in Croatia under the jurisdiction of the Serbian Orthodox Eparchy of Srem. The records of baptisms, marriages, and deaths have been preserved since 1761, while the household protocol has been maintained since 1846. The church's iconostasis was created between 1836 and 1840.

=== Lutheran Christmas Mass of 1859 ===
First Danube Swabians settled in Banovci in 1859 where they were relying on the support of local Serbian Orthodox priest Uroš. As the northern part of historical region of Syrmia was predetermined for German Catholic colonists, and settlement in the biggest part of Slavonian Military Frontier was almost impossible, German Protestants had to settle in the bordering region between these two jurisdictions. As there was no Lutheran church in Banovci at that time, German Protestant settlers asked priest Uroš to hold a Christmas Mass for them under the Eastern Orthodox liturgical rite. Priest Uroš have refused this request as it was contrary to Orthodox canonical rules, yet he offered them to organize Christmas Celebration on their own in the St. Petka church. He also attended their celebration which impressed him but he did not lead the prayer.

=== 19th and 20th century ===
In the interwar period, after the establishment of the Kingdom of Serbs, Croats and Slovenes, parish in Šidski Banovci covered orthodox communities in Vinkovački Banovci, Ilača, Ivanci and Đeletovci. One of the priests who served in Banovci was Ivan J. Lubarski, born on January 16, 1896, in Rudovka in Russian Empire. He was ordained as a deacon on November 10, 1923, and as a priest the following day by Maksimilijan Hajdin, the bishop of Gornji Karlovac. Lubarski completed his theological studies at a seminary in Kharkiv and was fluent in Russian and Serbian. He was married with two daughters and began his service in the Banovci parish on October 23, 1934.

During World War II Genocide of Serbs in the Independent State of Croatia local Orthodox community like many areas experienced religious persecution and attempts at forced conversion to Roman Catholicism. Despite efforts, the response from the Orthodox population in Banovci was minimal, with only few conversions reported.

The meeting was held on February 25, 1946, regarding agrarian reform for the church community in Šidski Banovci. Participants included local committee members, agrarian stakeholders, and the church community president. The District Commission for Agrarian Reform and Colonization in Slavonski Brod allocated 17 hectares and 603 square meters for the parish, while expropriating 37 hectares and 185 square meters for reform purposes. Out of the 42 legal entities owned by the Serbian Orthodox Church that underwent nationalization, appeals were filed in 35 cases, while the church municipality in Banovci did not appeal. Another building associated with the church was nationalized in late 1959 by a resolution from the Nationalization Commission at the Local People's Committee in Tovarnik.

=== Recent history ===
In 2019 the bell tower was restored, and the damaged bells were repaired and electrified, as only one bell had previously been in use. Measures were taken to address rising damp in the walls, a critical step in the building's preservation. This included isolating and treating the walls to prevent further deterioration. In the same year the church commemorated its 200th anniversary, with a liturgy led by Bishop Vasilije. The restoration received support from the local administration in Nijemci Municipality, which funded moisture protection in the church. Additional financial support for the project was provided by the Office for Religious Communities in Serbia. The community highlighted the need to build a parish home in the future to provide a residence for the priest. The church was damaged during the 19 and 21 July storms of the 2023 European heatwaves.

== Gallery ==
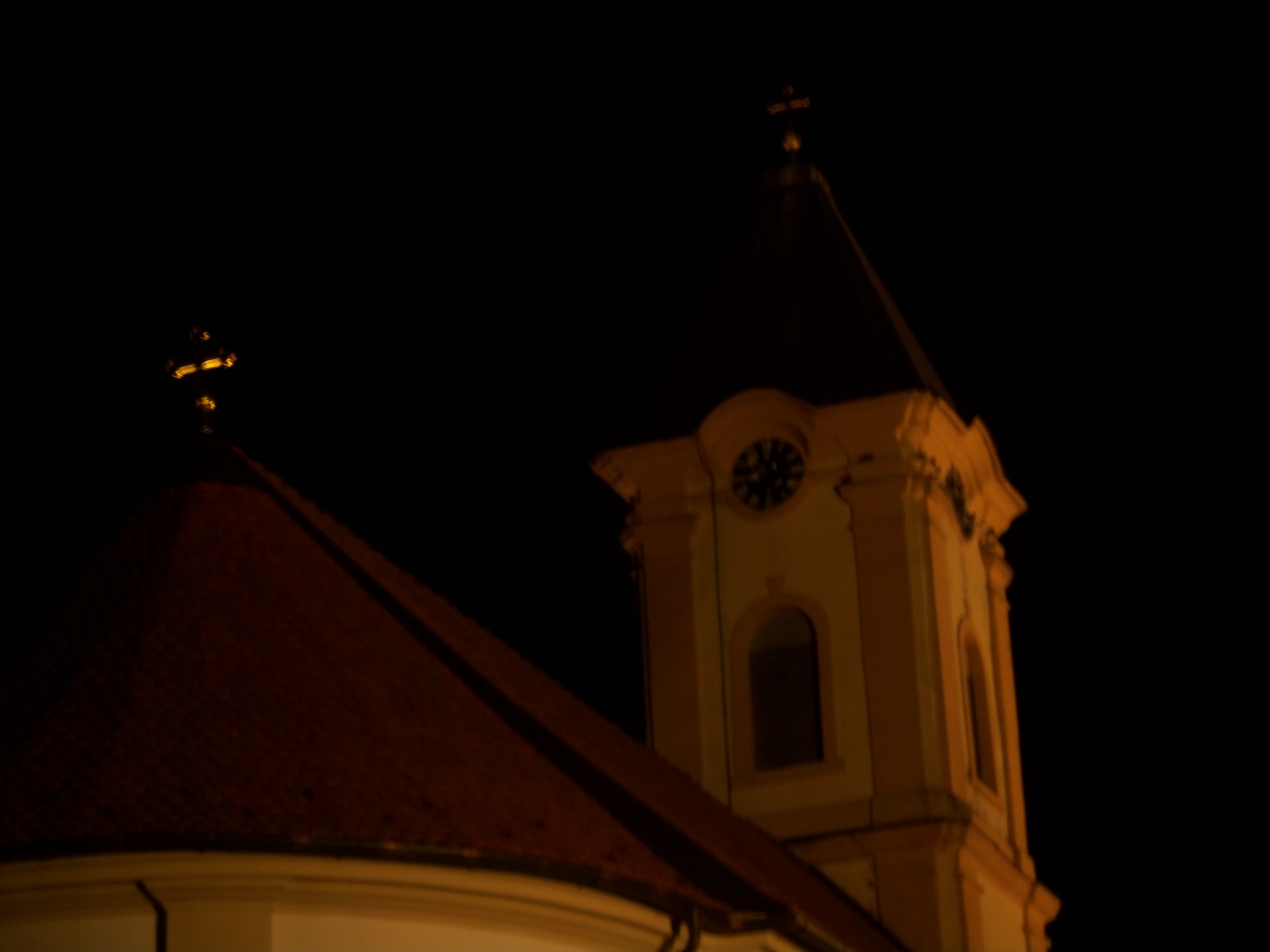

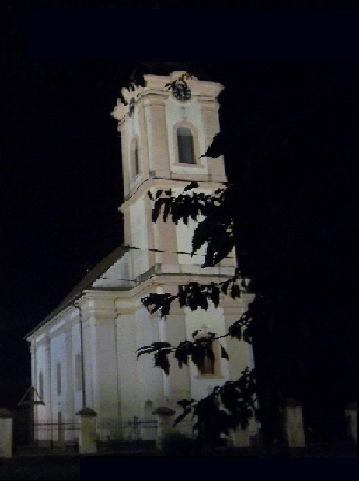

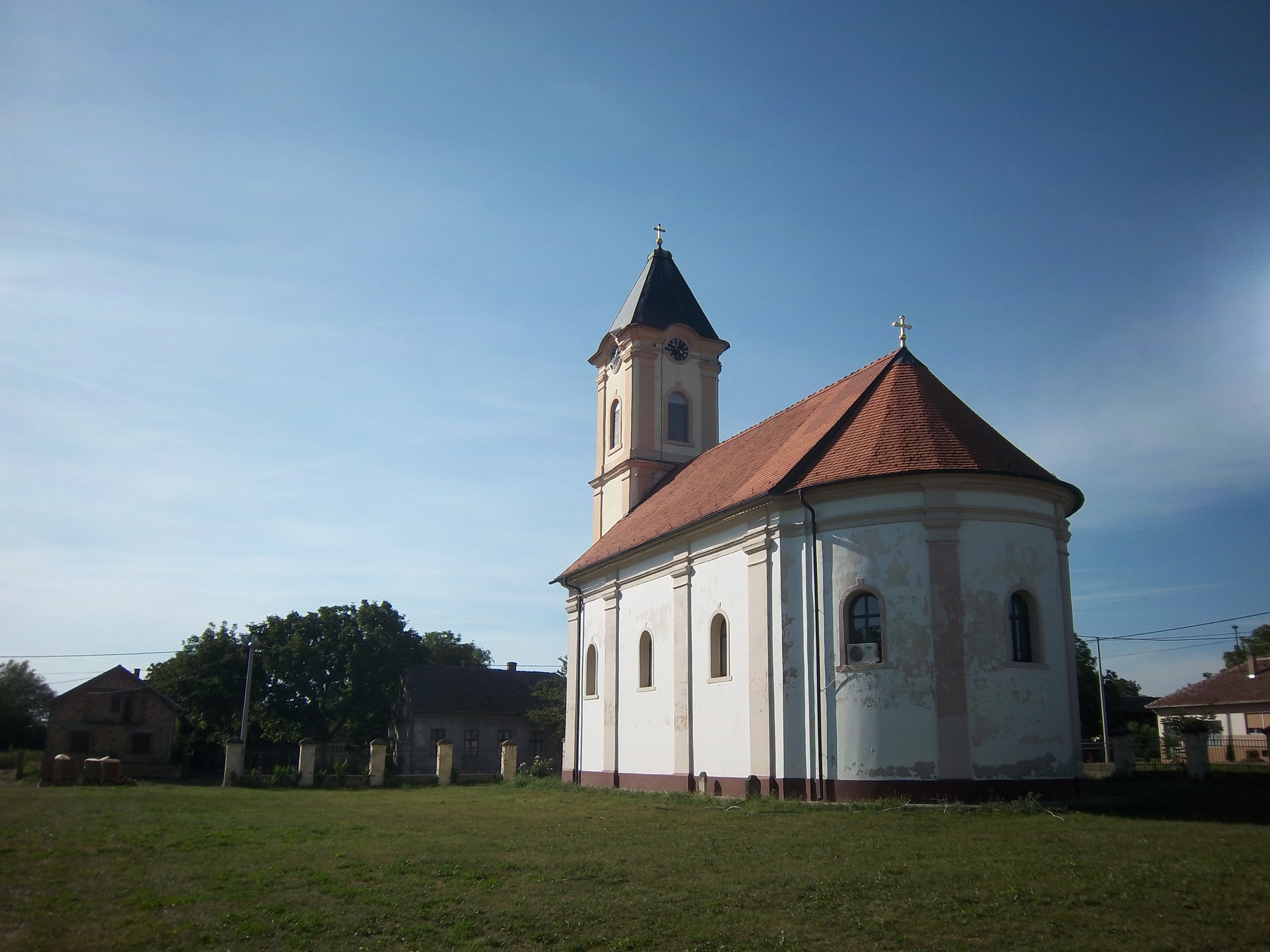

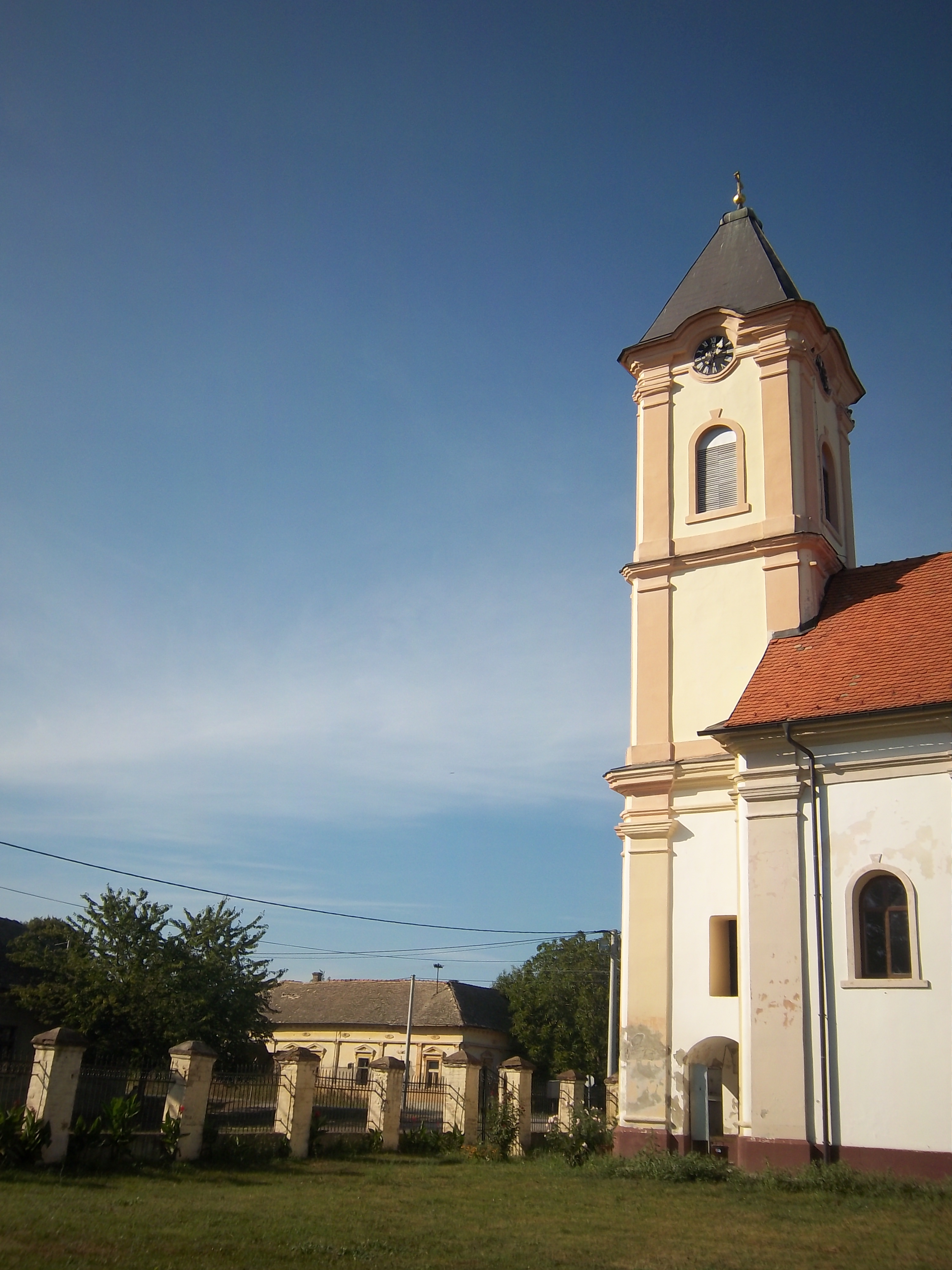

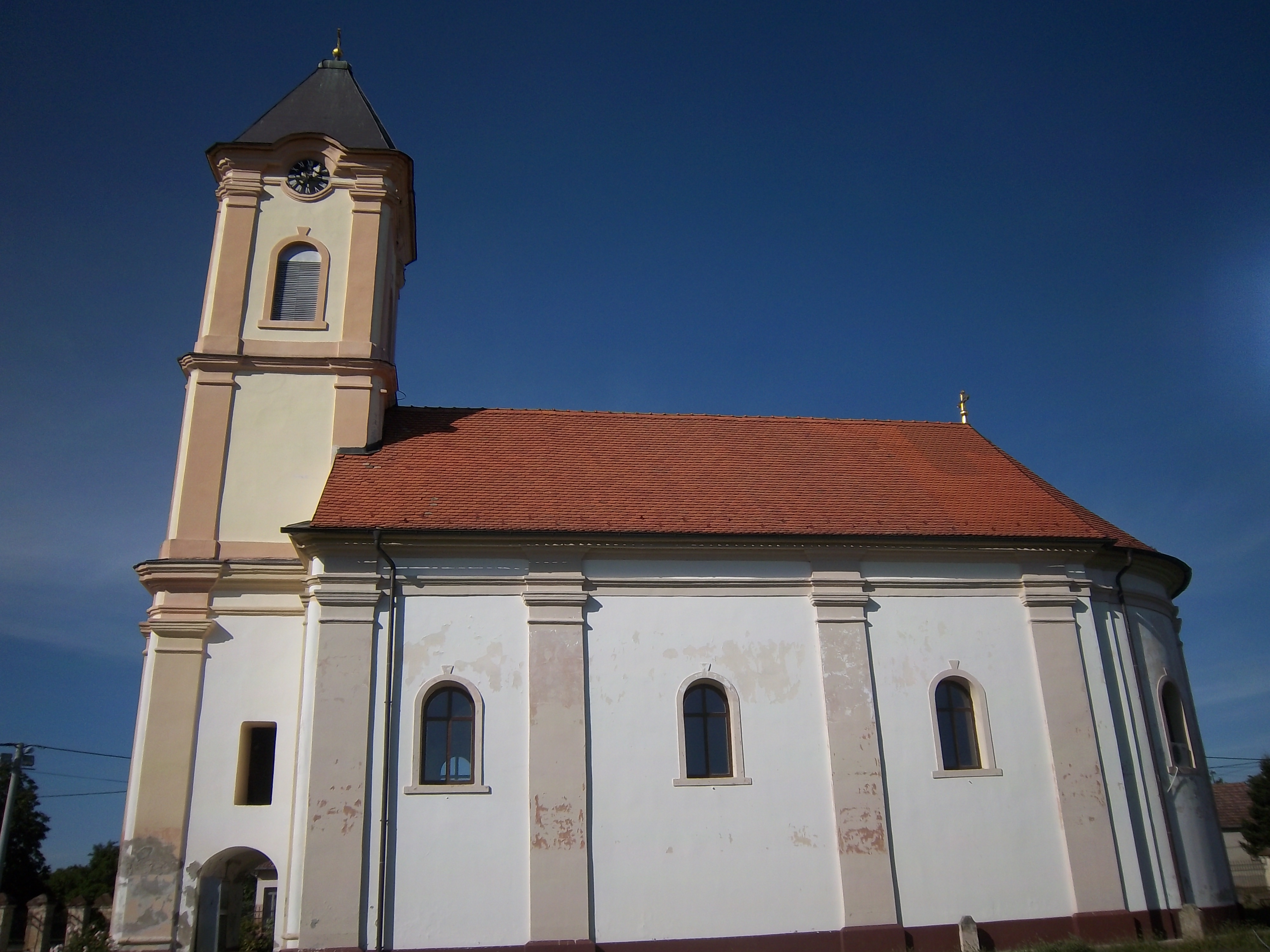

== See also ==
- Serbs of Croatia
- Evangelical Reformed Church in Šidski Banovci
- List of Serbian Orthodox churches in Croatia
