= Evangelical Reformed Church in Šidski Banovci =

- Evangelisch-Reformierte Kirche Šidski Banovci (German) Evangelička crkva u Šidskim Banovcima (Croatian) Евангелистичка црква у Шидским Бановцима (Serbian)
- Location: Banovci
- Country: Croatia
- Denomination: Lutheran
- Churchmanship: Evangelical Church in the Republic of Croatia

Architecture
- Completed: 1878 or later
- Demolished: 1944 or later

Evangelical Reformed Church (German: Evangelisch-Reformierte Kirche Šidski Banovci, Croatian: Evangelička crkva u Šidskim Banovcima, Serbian Cyrillic: Евангелистичка црква у Шидским Бановцима) in Banovci in eastern Croatia was an historical Evangelical Reformed church of the local Danube Swabians community. Danube Swabians community was expelled from the village in 1944 at the end of the World War II in Yugoslavia in expulsion which took place all over Eastern and Central Europe. Following the expulsion the local Evangelical church was demolished. The church books of the parish are available for 1862-1954 period and were published in 1987 in Stuttgart.

== Lutheran Christmas Mass of 1859 ==
First Protestant Danube Swabians settled in Banovci in 1859 where they initially relied on support of local Serbian Orthodox priest Uroš. As the northern part of historical region of Syrmia was predetermined for German Catholic colonists, and settlement in the biggest part of Slavonian Military Frontier was almost impossible, German Protestants had to settle in the bordering region between these two jurisdictions. As there was no Lutheran church in Banovci at that time, German Protestant settlers asked priest Uroš to hold a Christmas Mass for them under the Eastern Orthodox liturgical rite. Priest Uroš have refused this request as it was contrary to Orthodox canonical rules, yet he offered them to organize Christmas Celebration on their own in the Church of the Holy Venerable Mother Parascheva. Orthodox priest also attended Evangelical celebration which left positive impression on him.

== See also ==
- Evangelical Church, Zagreb
- Church of the Holy Venerable Mother Parascheva
- Germans of Croatia
- Evangelical Church, Zemun
- Evangelical Church in the Republic of Croatia
- Evangelical-Lutheran Church in Hungary
  - Religious tolerance of Protestantism in Ottoman Hungary (Protestantism and Islam)
  - Edict of Torda
  - Crypto-Protestantism
  - Patent of Toleration
- Slovak Evangelical Church of the Augsburg Confession in Serbia
- Slovak Evangelical Church, Šid
