= Vukobratović =

Vukobratović (Serbian Cyrillic: Вукобратовић) is a Serbian surname, derived from the male given name Vukobrat. Notable people with the surname include:

- Dragomir Vukobratović (b. 1988), Serbian footballer
- Lana Vukobratović (b. 1954), Serbian film editor
- Miomir Vukobratović (1931–2012), Serbian roboticist
