= Dragomir Vukobratović =

Serbian footballer

Personal information
- Date of birth: 12 May 1988 (age 38)
- Place of birth: Karlovac, SR Croatia, SFR Yugoslavia
- Height: 1.80 m (5 ft 11 in)
- Position: Defensive midfielder

Team information
- Current team: Polet Novi Karlovci

Youth career
- Vojvodina

Senior career*
Years	Team	Apps	(Gls)
2006–2008	Vojvodina	28	(0)
2007	→ Voždovac (loan)	14	(2)
2008–2009	Red Star Belgrade	2	(0)
2009	→ Inđija (loan)	11	(1)
2010	Borac Banja Luka	9	(0)
2010–2011	Inđija	17	(0)
2011–2012	Gazovik Orenburg	23	(0)
2012–2013	Sunkar	9	(0)
2013	Metallurg-Kuzbass Novokuznetsk	10	(0)
2013	Gazovik Orenburg	10	(0)
2014	Levadia Tallinn	19	(1)
2015	Osijek	8	(0)
2016	OFK Beograd	13	(1)
2016–2017	Górnik Łęczna	5	(0)
2018	Radnik Surdulica	4	(0)
2018–2019	Proleter Novi Sad	12	(0)
2019	Ermis Aradippou	5	(0)
2020–2021	RFK Novi Sad		
2021	Podunavac Belegiš		
2022	Hajduk Divoš		
2022	Kabel		
2023	Mladost Bački Jarak		
2023	Cement Beočin		
2024	Podrinje Mačvanska Mitrovica		
2024	Radnički Irig		
2025-	Polet Novi Karlovci		

International career
2007	Serbia U19	3	(0)
- * Club domestic league appearances and goals as of 21:57, 19 January 2020 (UTC)

Dragomir Vukobratović (Serbian Cyrillic: Драгомир Вукобратовић; born 12 May 1988) is a Serbian footballer who plays for Polet Novi Karlovci.

== Club career ==
Vukobratović came up through the ranks at FK Vojvodina.

== Honours ==
Borac Banja Luka

- Bosnia and Herzegovina Cup: 2009–10

Levadia

- Meistriliiga: 2014
- Estonian Cup: 2013–14
