= Evangelical Church, Zagreb =

Coordinates: 45.8094°N 15.9721°E

Evangelical Church in Zagreb
- Evangelička crkva u Zagrebu; Evangelische Kirche in Zagreb
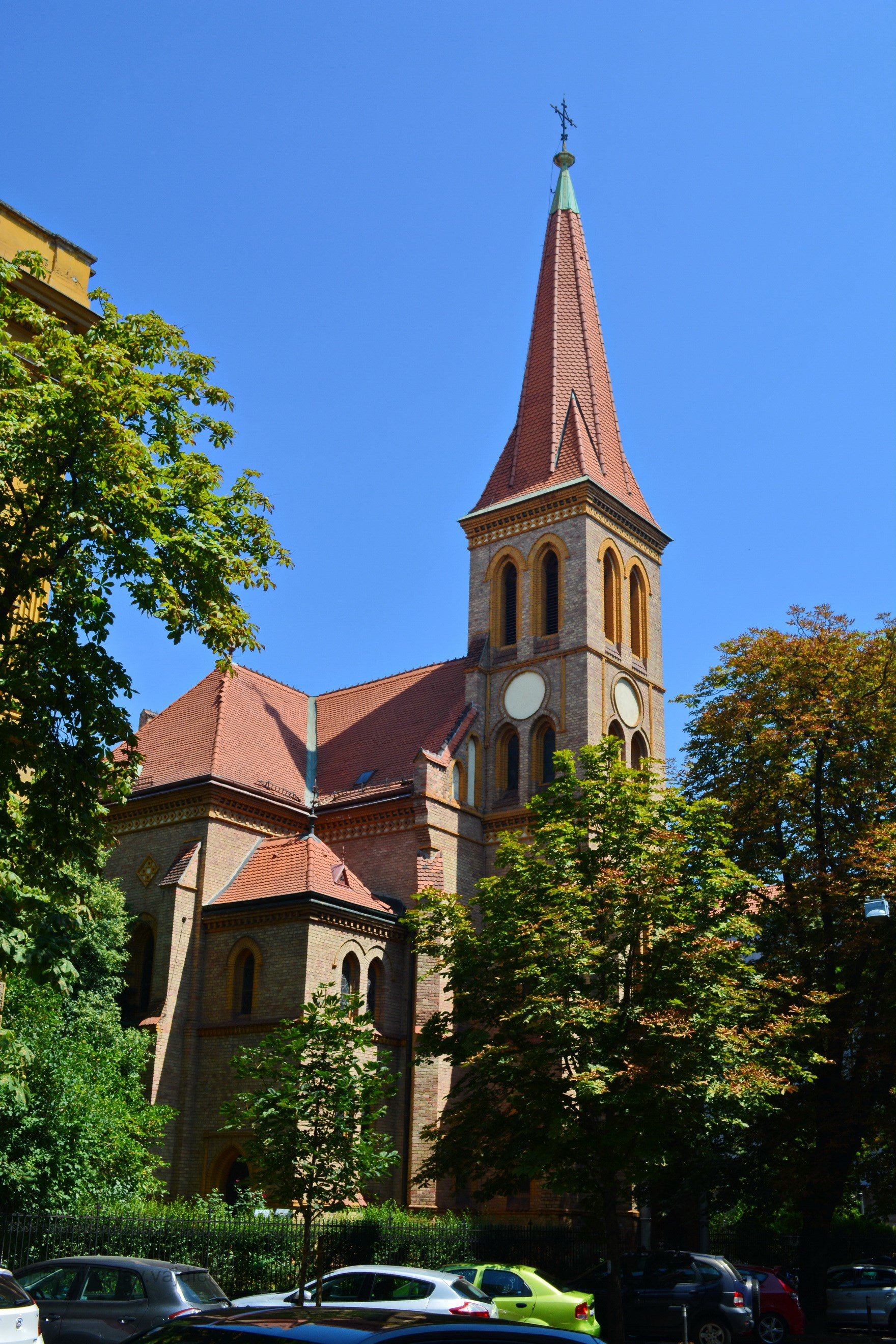
- Evangelical Church in Zagreb
- Evangelical Church in Zagreb
- Location: Gundulićeva 28, Zagreb
- Country: Croatia
- Denomination: Lutheran
- Churchmanship: Evangelical Church in the Republic of Croatia
- Website: www.ecrh.hr/crkvene-opcine/zagreb/

Architecture
- Architect: Hermann Bollé
- Architectural type: Neo-Gothic Architecture
- Completed: 1884; 142 years ago

Cultural Good of Croatia
- Type: Protected cultural good
- Reference no.: Z-333

The Evangelical Church in Zagreb (Croatian: Evangelička crkva u Zagrebu; German: Evangelische Kirche in Zagreb; Hungarian: Evangélikus Egyház Zágrábban; Slovak: Evanjelický kostol v Záhrebe) is an Evangelical Lutheran Church located in centre of Zagreb (Donji Grad, close to the Republic of Croatia Square), Croatia. The church was originally built in period from 1882 until 1884. The building is a free-standing single-nave neo-Gothic church.

== History ==
=== Evangelism in Zagreb ===
The Protestant Reformation of the sixteenth century affected most European peoples, including the Eastern Europe. Among its most prominent representatives in the region was the theologian and philologist Matthias Flacius Illyricus, author of the monumental Magdeburg Centuries, the first systematic history of the Church from the first to the thirteenth century. Other notable figures included Peter Paul Vergerio, as well as Andrija Dudić, Juraj Drašković, Markantun de Dominis, Primož Trubar and Ivan Ungnad.

Under strong Counter-Reformation influence, however, Protestantism failed to take deep root in Croatian lands. Seventeenth- and early eighteenth-century legislation restricted Protestant rights, despite the relative toleration granted elsewhere in the Habsburg Monarchy. A significant shift occurred with the Patent of Toleration issued in 1781 by Emperor Joseph II, later reaffirmed in 1859 by Franz Joseph I, granting limited civil and religious freedoms to Protestants.

By 1850, Zagreb counted approximately 120 Evangelicals (Augsburg and Helvetic Confessions), though without formal organization or clergy. After initial pastoral visits from Ljubljana, a filial congregation was established in 1855 but soon faced official opposition. The first public Evangelical service in Zagreb was held in 1865 in a private prayer hall. In 1866 the Croatian Parliament recognized Protestant equality in principle, though implementation was delayed.

The Evangelical Church Municipality of Zagreb was formally established in 1877. Under Pastor Andrija Dijaniška, and with support from the Gustav Adolf Association in Karlsruhe, funds were secured for construction of a church and parsonage on land donated by the city.

A decisive period followed under Pastor Julius Kolatschek, who assumed office in 1883. He strengthened congregational life, founded a women’s society (1886) and an Evangelical school (1888), and promoted the establishment of new congregations, including in Bosnia. At the Zagreb Synod of 1893 he advocated a united church of the Augsburg (Lutheran) and Helvetic (Reformed) confessions; although this proposal met resistance, the Zagreb congregation itself remained united in practice. Kolatschek retired in 1899 and died in 1900. In 2008, a parish library was named in his honor. He was succeeded by Pastor Georg Bayer later in 1899.

=== Church ===
The church was constructed between 1882 and 1884 according to the designs of Hermann Bollé as a single-nave Neo-Gothic church with a transept and a three-storey bell tower aligned with the main façade. The tower houses three bells symbolically named Faith, Hope, and Charity. The church was erected on a corner plot donated by the City of Zagreb in 1880 and enclosed by a wrought-iron fence. The church was consecrated on 30 March 1884 as Christus Kirche (Christ Church).

On the northern part of the parcel stands a semi-detached, single-storey Evangelical parsonage, built between 1881 and 1882, also following plans by Hermann Bollé. The Evangelical church in Zagreb represents one of Bollé’s earliest realized works in the city and, unlike his numerous restorations of Roman Catholic churches, it was conceived as an entirely new structure. A second floor was added to the parsonage in 1931. On the western section of the plot, an additional two-storey wing of the Evangelical parish complex was constructed in 1908–1909 according to the designs of Rudolf Lubynski.

The church has been preserved in its entirety, together with its original furnishings. The wooden pulpit, crafted by Miroslav Häcker, is positioned in the apse. The wooden pews and organ case were made by Josip Oblak. The baptismal font is centrally placed in front of the altar, while a wooden choir loft and gallery supported by wooden columns extend into the arms of the transept. The organ, built in 1884, is one of the final works of the distinguished Zagreb organ builder Michael Heferer. A particular curiosity of Heferer’s workshop is that this instrument—featuring mechanical key and stop action—is one of only two organs he constructed with cone-valve wind chests (so-called Kegellade).

The ribs of the Neo-Gothic cross and net vaults were executed in profiled brick. The original wall decoration was subsequently overpainted. The stained-glass windows, depicting Christ as the central figure, with Martin Luther to Christ’s right and Philipp Melanchthon to his left, were produced in 1933 by the workshop Koch and Marinković. The church façades are constructed in brick in two tonal variations. The darker red brick emphasizes architectural details, including cornices, window lintels, and the main portal, which is framed by stone columns. The iron-bound portal doors represent a high-quality example of craftsmanship produced by a vocational school workshop.

== Gallery ==
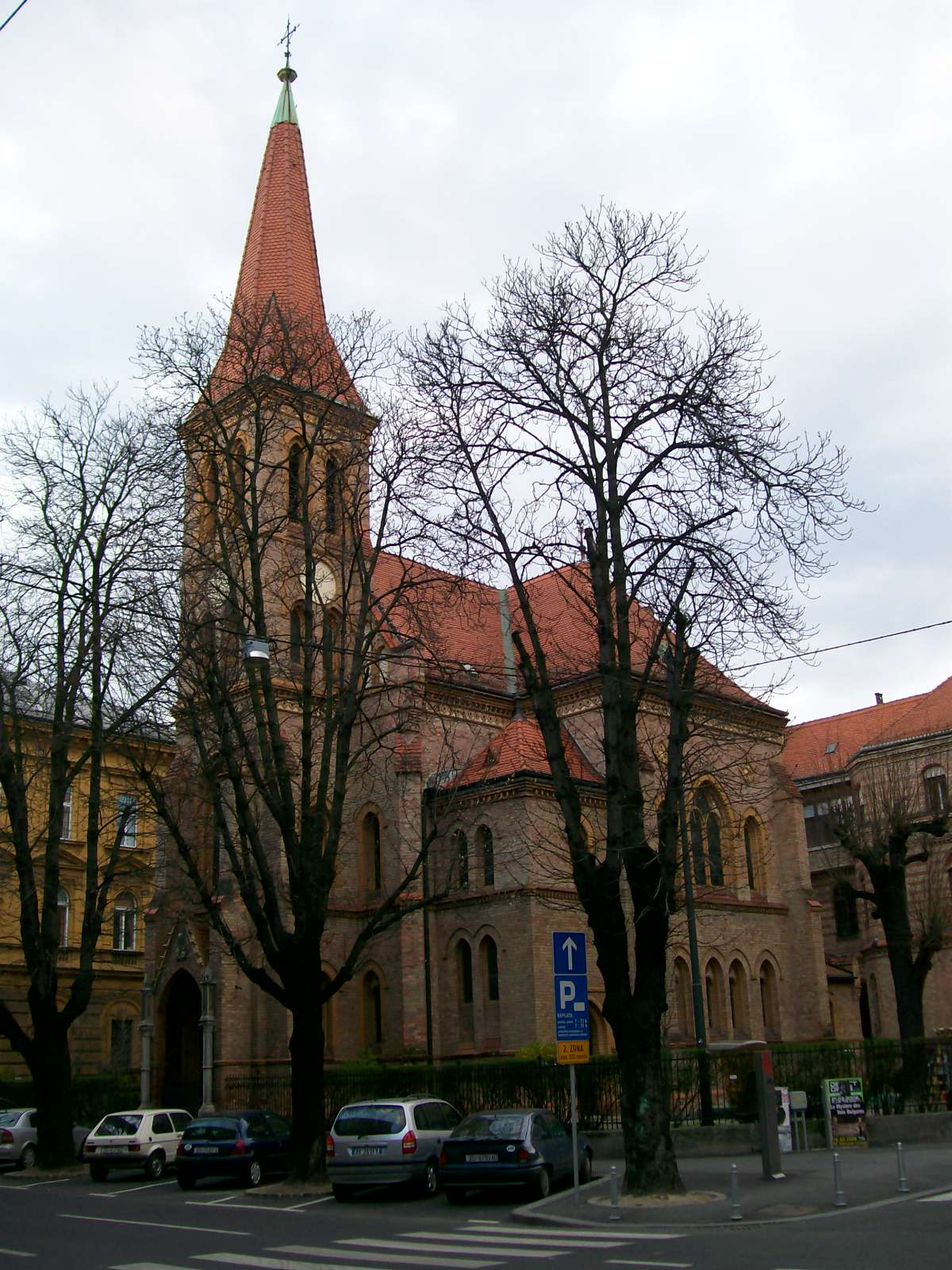
East view

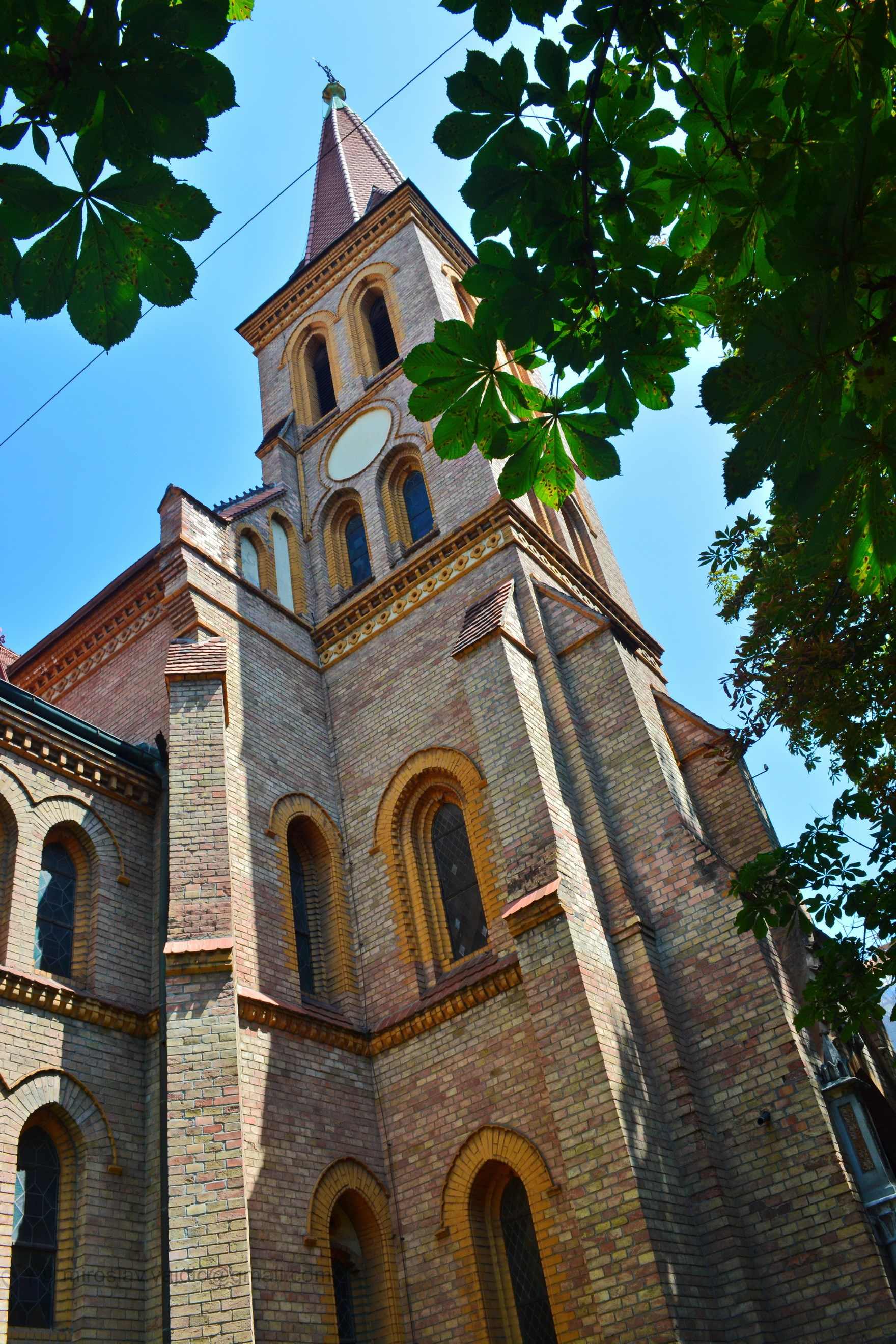
West view

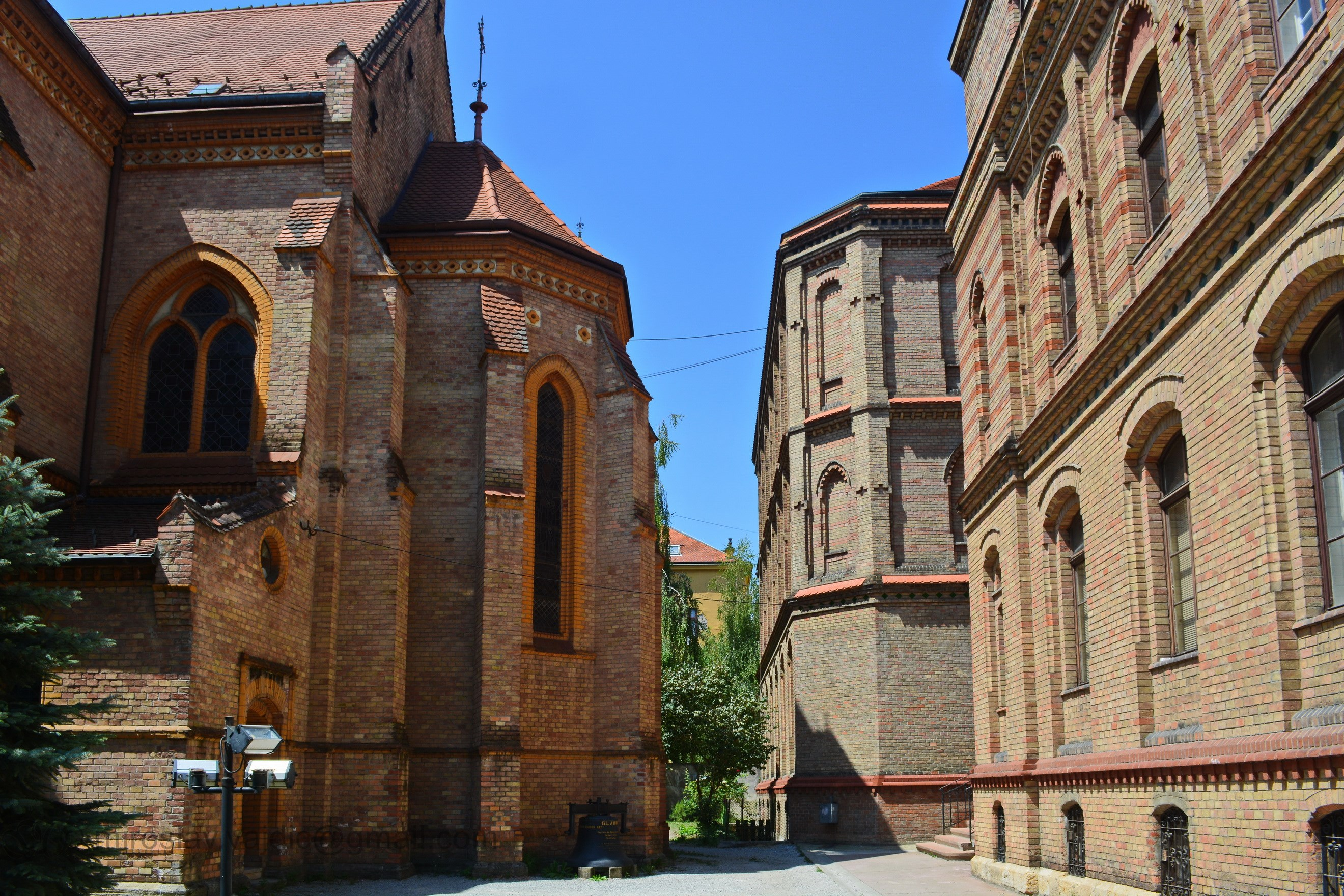
South nave

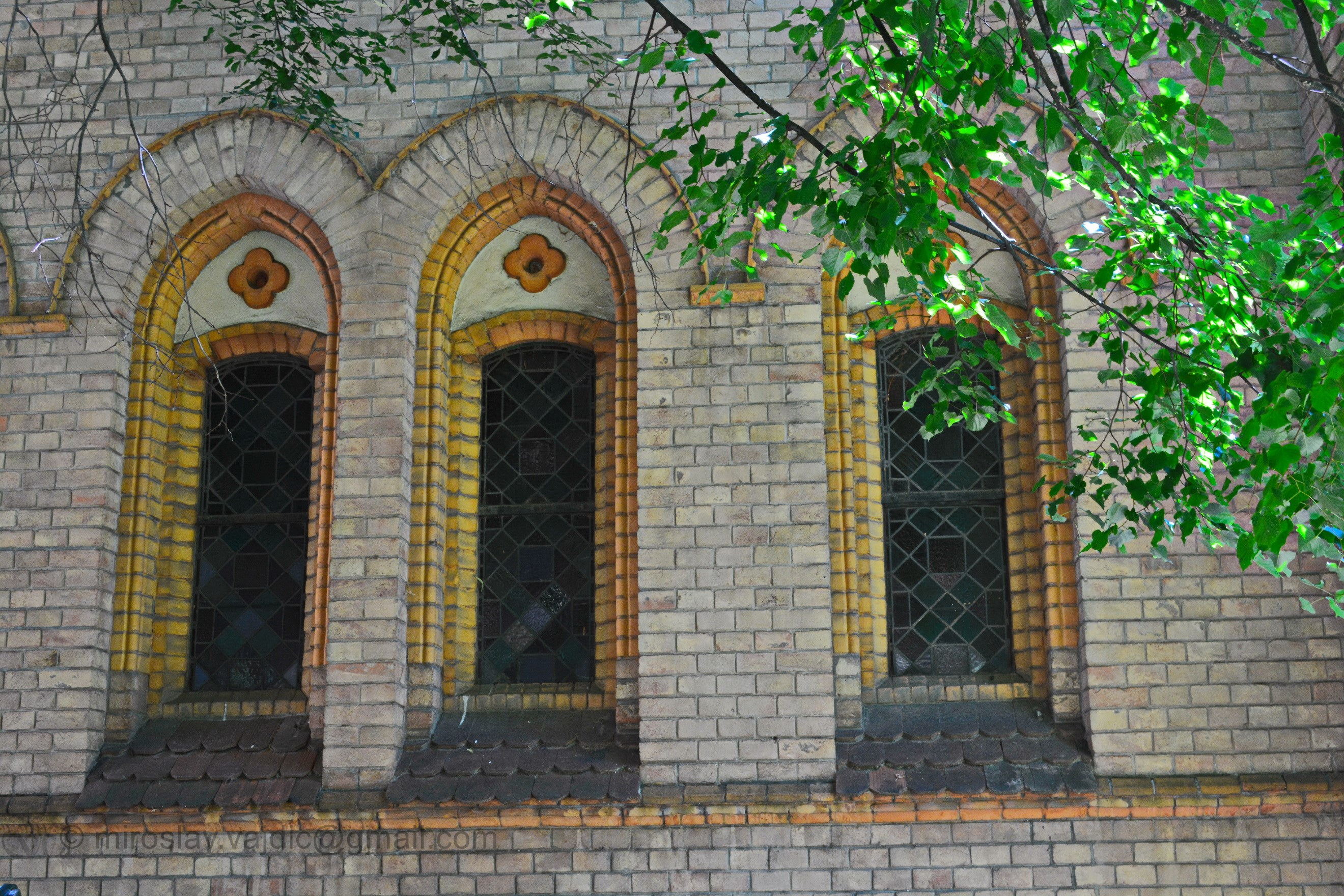
Windows

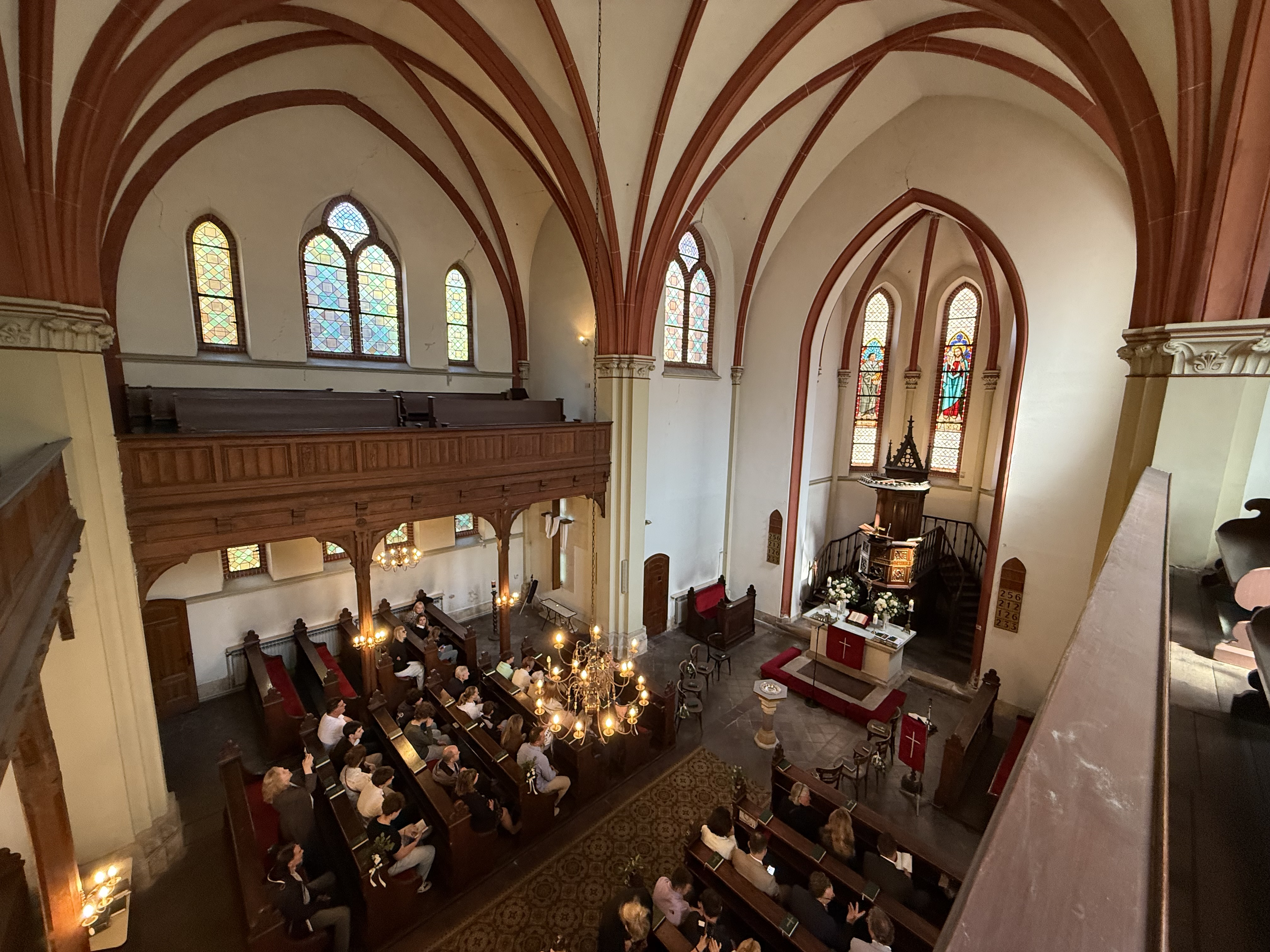
Main nave

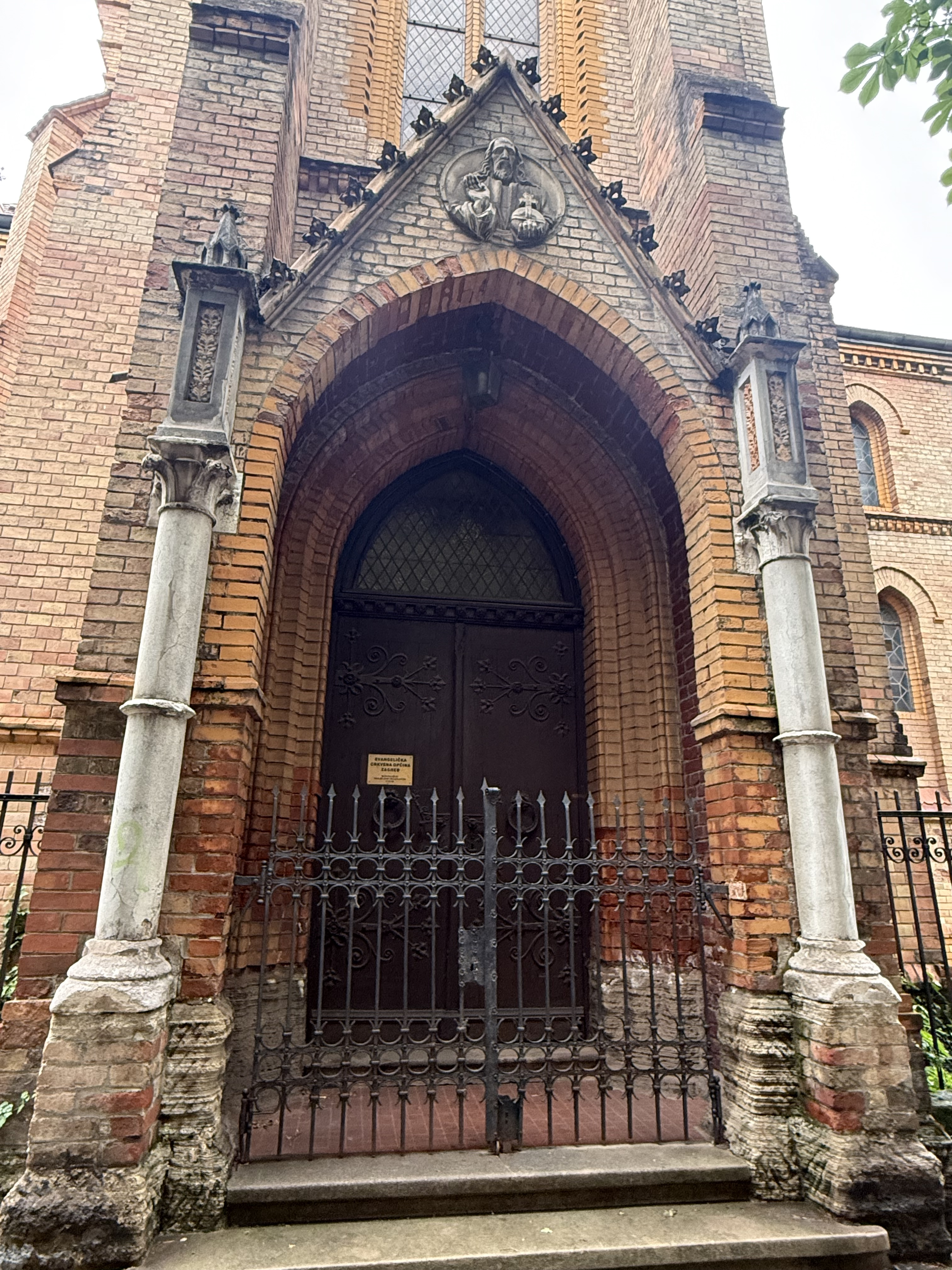
Portal

== See also ==
- Evangelical Reformed Church in Šidski Banovci
