= Ivanci massacre =

Complete destruction of Serb village in eastern Croatia

- Location: Independent State of Croatia (modern day Croatia)
- Date: 30 November 1943
- Target: Serbs of Ivanci, mostly Yugoslav Partisans and/or Communists
- Attack type: Mass murder
- Deaths: 73

The Ivanci massacre was the complete destruction of the Serb village of Ivanci in eastern Croatia (south of Ilača) on 30 November 1943 by Nazi German forces.

During World War II, Syrmia was a part of The Independent State of Croatia led by the fascist Ustaša regime which implemented genocide of Serbs on its territory. The historical Serb village of Ivanci, which was located south of Ilača, was destroyed on 30 November 1943 while 73 inhabitants were killed in half an hour.

The village had been the center of the Yugoslav Partisans in Syrmia, with local branches of the Women's Antifascist Front of Yugoslavia and the League of Communist Youth of Yugoslavia. Surviving villagers found safety in Šidski Banovci, Tovarnik and Ilača.

The village of Ivanci was never resettled after the end of World War II. The commemorative site was constructed in the old village in 1956 but it was devastated in 1991 in the early stages of the Croatian War of Independence. In 2012 the non-governmental organization "Ivanci" was established in the village of Šidski Banovci aimed at reconstruction of the monument in the memorial area, collection of materials for the publication of a monograph and organization of commemorations.

== See also ==
- List of mass executions and massacres in Yugoslavia during World War II
- Dudik Memorial Park
- Gudovac massacre
- Lidice massacre
- Michniów massacre
- Oradour-sur-Glane massacre
- Sant'Anna di Stazzema massacre
- Sochy massacre
