= Ivanci, Croatia =

Ivanci Иванци
- Village
- Location within Croatia
- Coordinates: 45°09′13″N 19°05′09″E
- Country: Croatia
- County: Vukovar-Syrmia County

Population
  - Total: 0
- Time zone: UTC+1 (CET)
  - Summer (DST): UTC+2 (CEST)

Ivanci (Serbian Cyrillic: Иванци) was a historical village in what is now Tovarnik Municipality in eastern Croatia. The village was destroyed on 30 November 1943 by Nazi German forces in what is known as the Ivanci massacre.

The village of Ivanci was center of the Yugoslav Partisans in Syrmia with established local branches of Women's Antifascist Front of Yugoslavia and League of Communist Youth of Yugoslavia. Surviving villagers found rescue in Šidski Banovci, Tovarnik and Ilača. The village of Ivanci was never resettled after World War II.

== Name ==
The name of the village in Croatian or Serbian is plural.

== Geography ==
The village was located just south of the main Zagreb–Belgrade railway north of which is the closest village of Ilača. The village was located in the drained wetland plain approximately 5 km north of Bosut river and Spačva basin. Within the Kingdom of Yugoslavia Ivanci were administratively part of Šid Srez firstly within the pre-Yugoslav the Syrmia County (up to 1922), the Syrmia Oblast (1922–1929), after that the Danube Banovina (1929–1939) and ultimately the Banovina of Croatia (1939–1941).

== Demographics ==
Majority of inhabitants of the village were ethnic Serbs. The village was founded as the colonizing enterprise of the Kingdom of Yugoslavia which granted land to Serbian war veterans from the Salonica front.
