= Vinkovački Banovci =

Vinkovački Banovci Винковачки Бановци (Serbian) Stari Banovci
- Village (Selo)
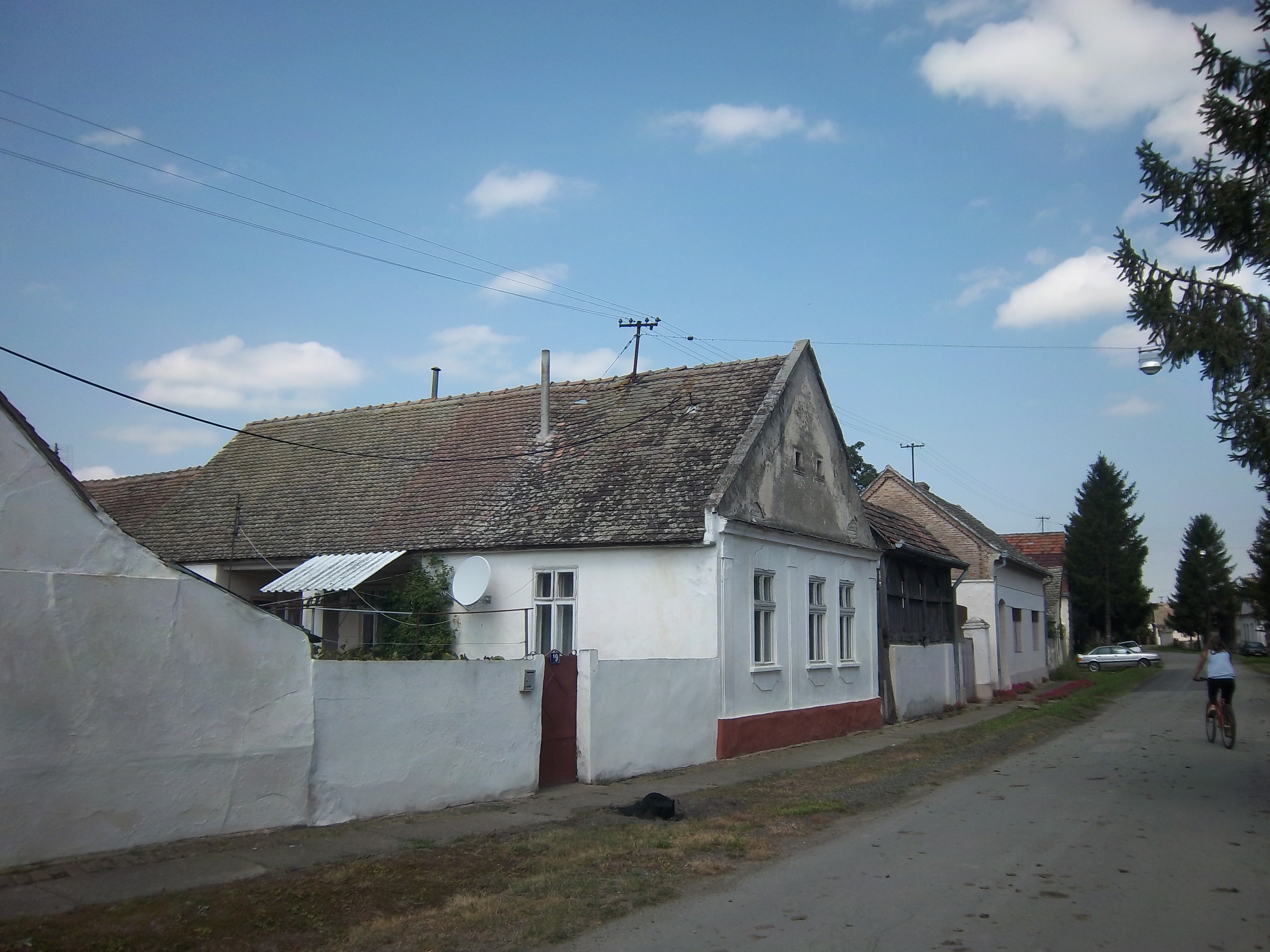

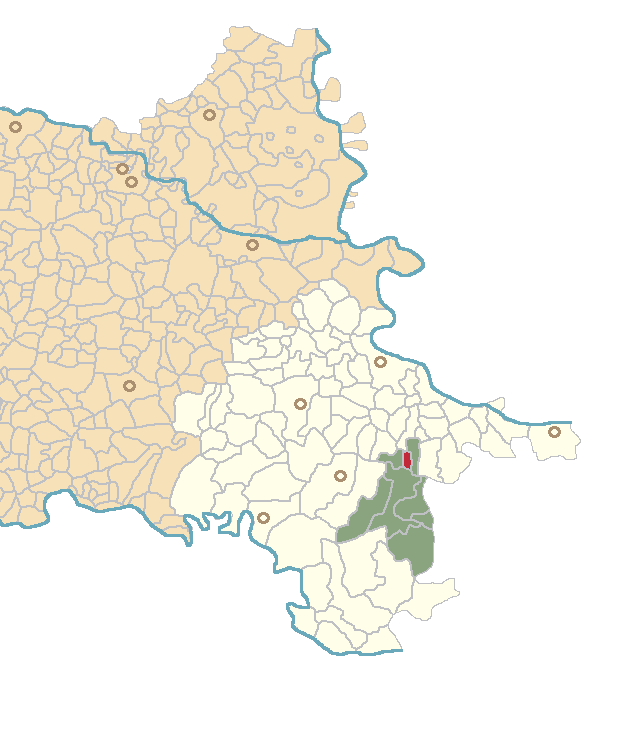

- Location within Vukovar-Syrmia County Location within Croatia Location within Europe
- Coordinates: 45°11′N 19°03′E
- Country: Croatia
- Region: Syrmia (Podunavlje)
- County: Vukovar-Syrmia
- Municipality: Nijemci

Government
  - Body: Local Committee

Area
  - Total: 4.6 km^{2} (1.8 sq mi)

Population (2021)
  - Total: 117
  - Density: 25/km^{2} (66/sq mi)
- Demonym(s): Banovčanin (♂) Banovčanka (♀) (per grammatical gender)
- Time zone: UTC+1 (CET)
  - Summer (DST): UTC+2 (CEST)
- Vehicle registration: VK

Vinkovački Banovci (Serbian Cyrillic: Винковачки Бановци, Hungarian: Bánóc) is a village in Croatia in the region of Syrmia. The village is a part of the Nijemci Municipality.

Serbian community constitute majority of the local population. The word Vinkovački in the name is an adjective derived from the name of the city of Vinkovci used to distinguish the village from the adjacent village of Banovci. Two villages are closely intertwined, sharing some local institutions and postal code. Banovci village itself developed as the new village of Vinkovački Banovci and in local vernacular they are known as Stari Banovci (Old Banovci for Vinkovački Banovci) and Novi Banovci (New Banovci for Šidski Banovci).

== Name ==
The name of the village in Croatian or Serbian is plural.

== History ==
The village was mentioned for the first time in 15th century. In 1473 the village under the name of Zavrakinci is mentioned to be on the small uplift just northwest of the village. First Serb settlers settled in Banovci during the reign of Charles VI, Holy Roman Emperor. Serb settlers at that time came from modern day Montenegro and from the region around Peć in Kosovo. Following Ottoman retreat from the region, the Lordship of Vukovar was established, and the village became part of its domain in 1716 until 1737 when it was transferred back to Slavonian Military Frontier. In 1745 Slavonian Military Frontier was fully established in the region.

== Education ==
The local school in Vinkovački Banovci was opened in 1946. In 1963, together with schools in nearby Ilača and Banovci, it was incorporated into a joint Ilača-Banovci Elementary School. In summer of 2025 the school in Vinkovački Banovci was closed after there was no new students in the village to be enrolled in the first grade.

== Languages ==
Due to the local minority population, the Nijemci municipality allows the use of not only Croatian as the official language, but the Serbian language and Serbian Cyrillic alphabet as well in Vikovački Banovci.

== Gallery ==
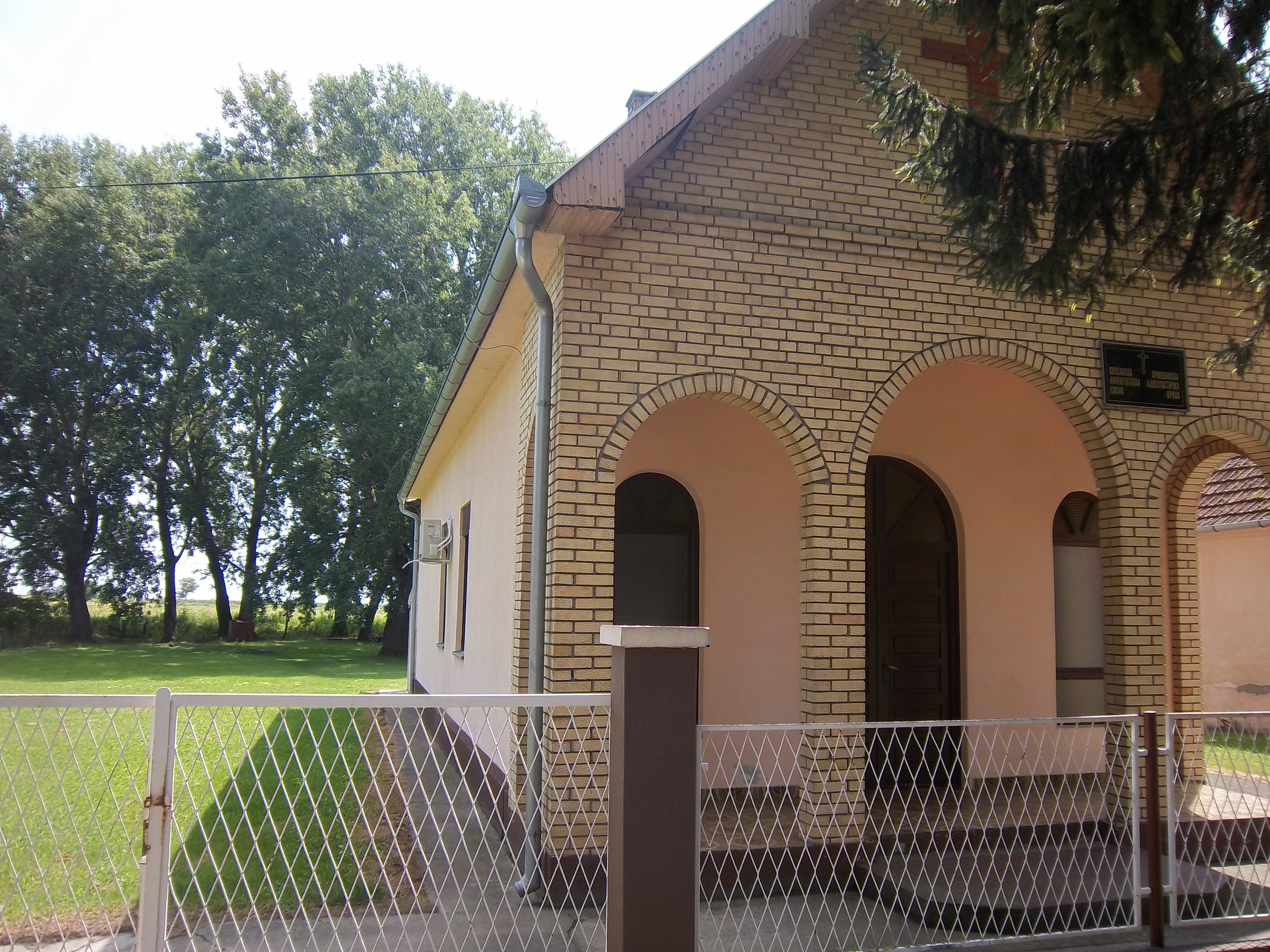

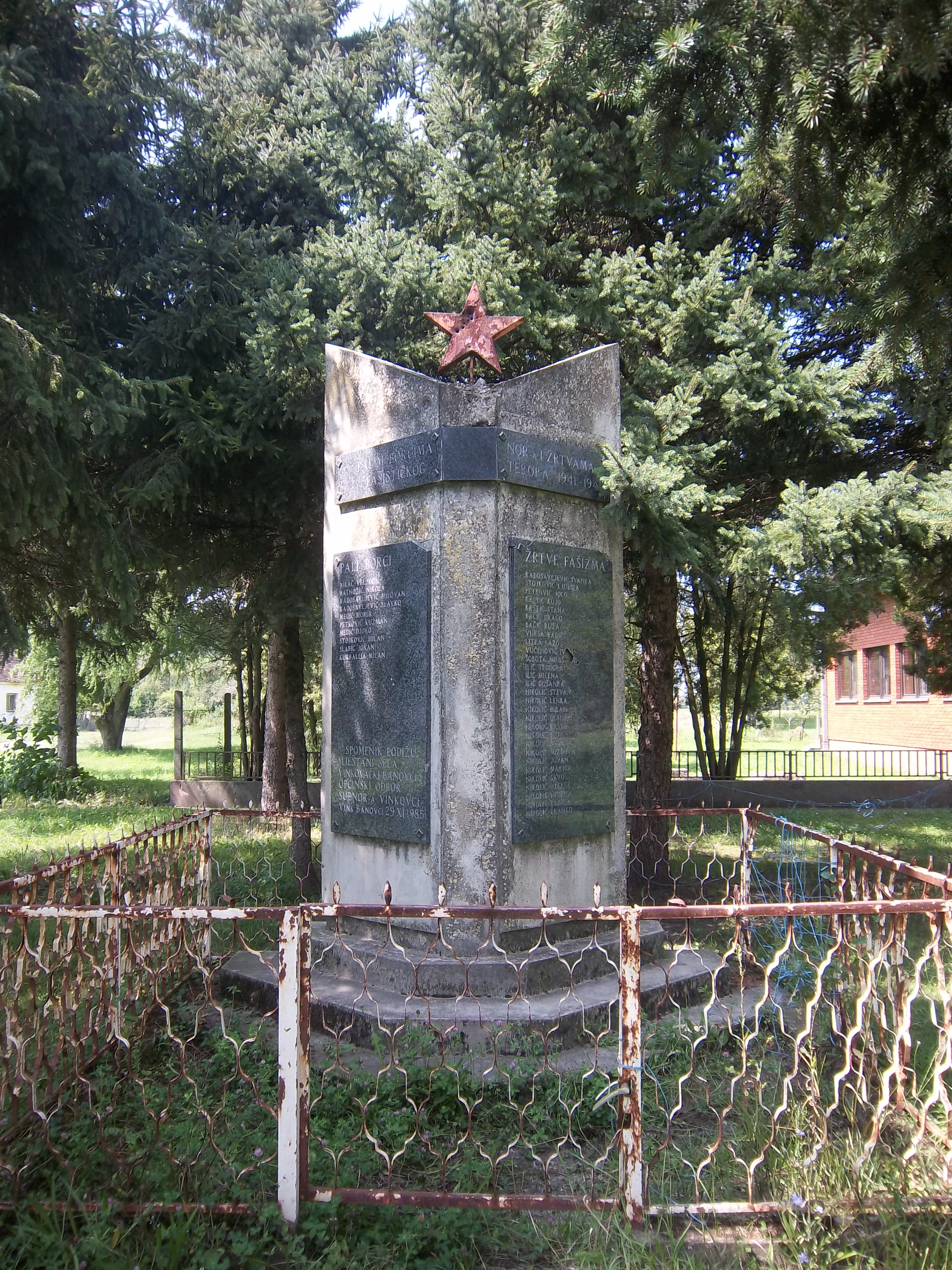

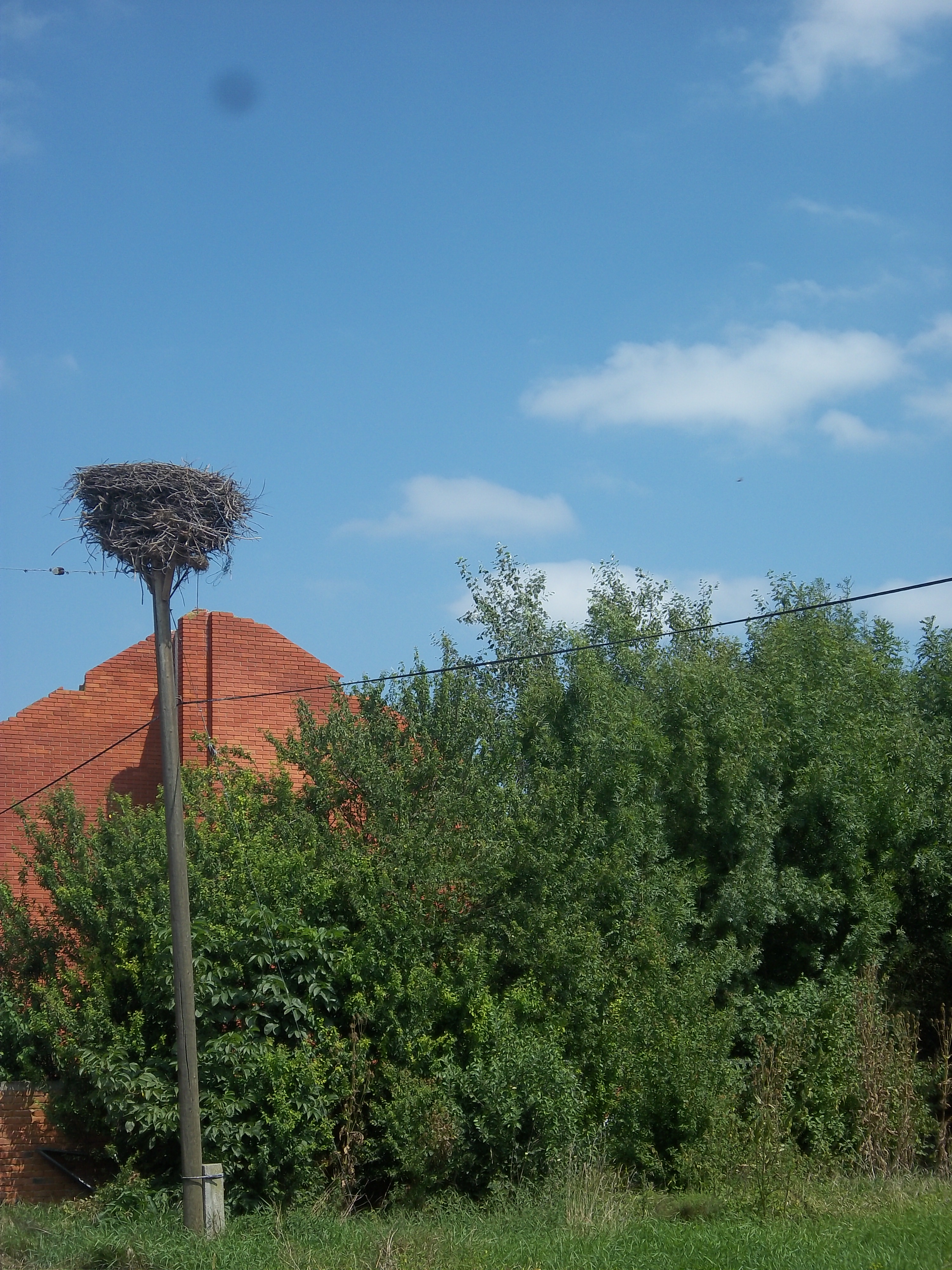

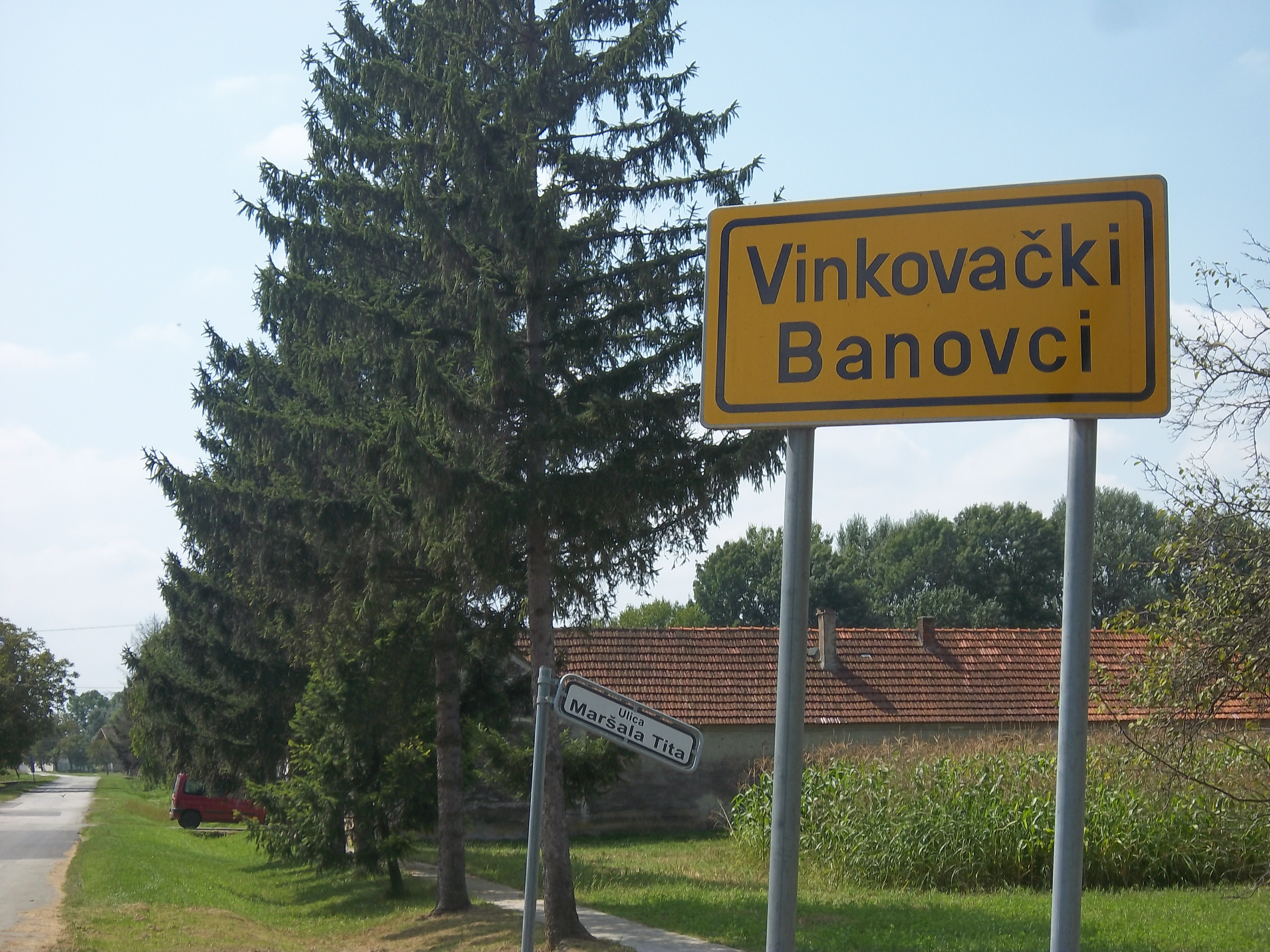
