= Evangelical Church, Belgrade =

Coordinates: 44°50′28″N 20°24′14″E

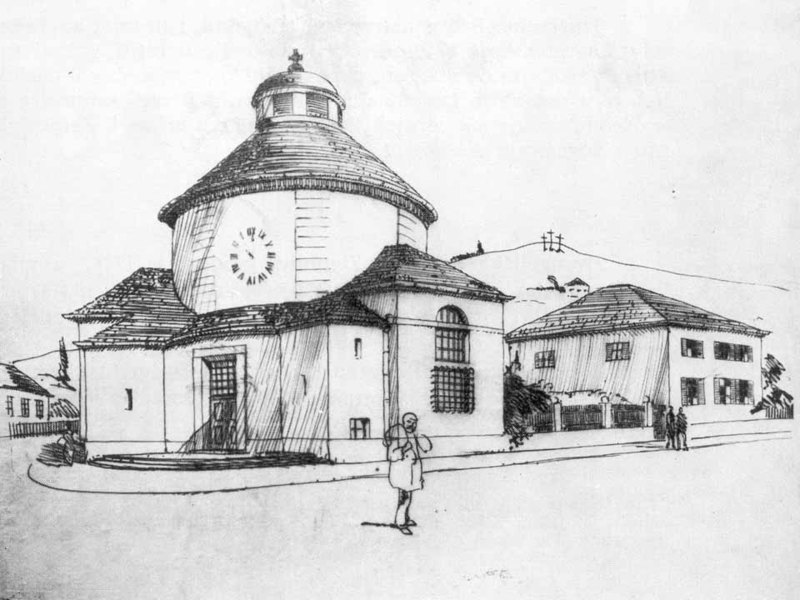
Sketch of Evangelical church by architect Hugo Ehrlich, 1928.

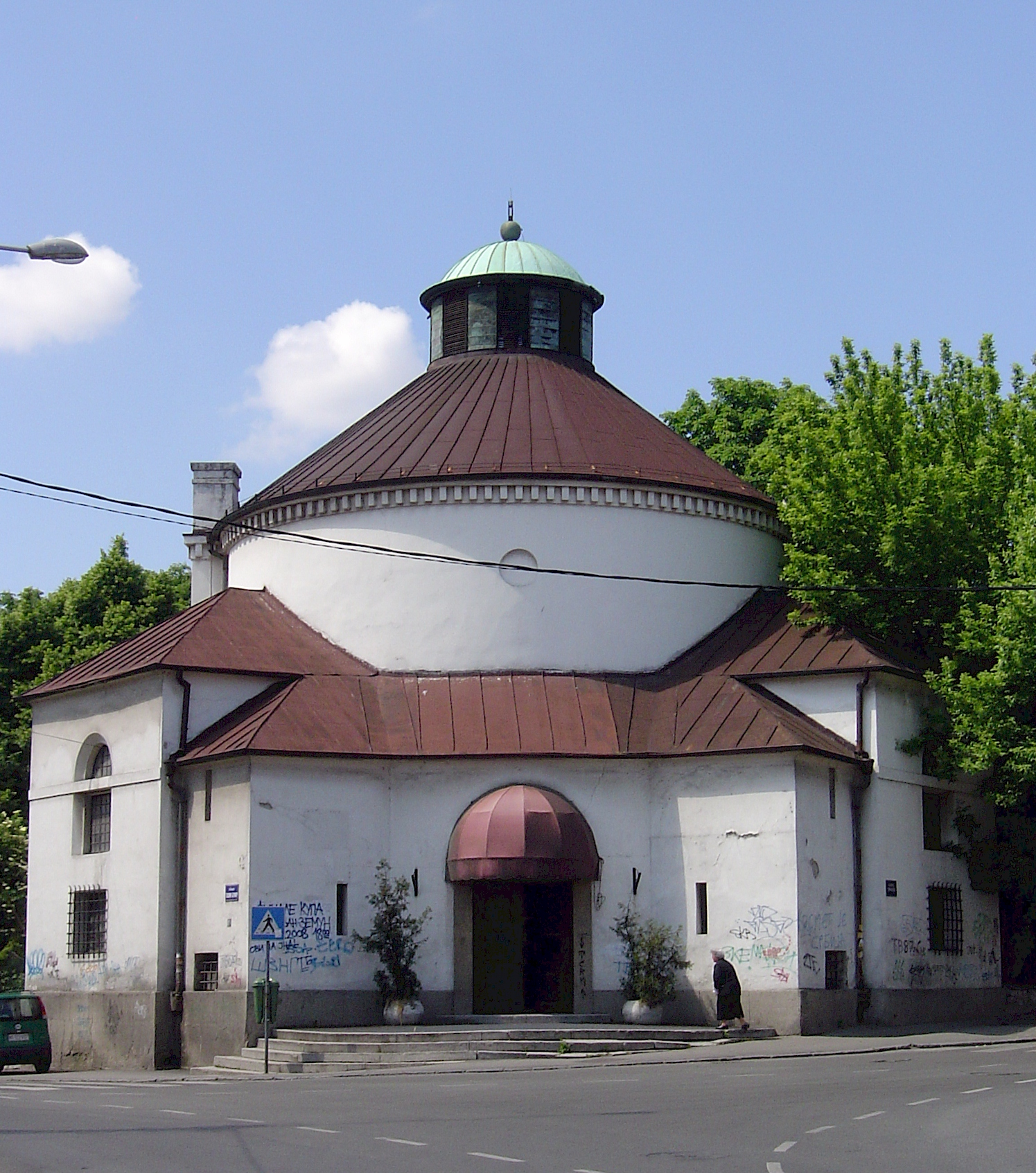
Evangelical church in Zemun, 2008.

The Evangelical Church (Serbian: Евангеличка црква, romanized: Evangelička crkva) in Zemun, Serbia was built in 1926–30 at the corner of Prilaz and Tošin Bunar streets. It was designed by Jewish-Croatian architect Hugo Ehrlich to serve needs of Zemun's Evangelical community at the time mostly consisted of Germans.

Its plan is reminiscent of a trefoil, a rotunda with a prominent east apse and two side wings placed symmetrically in relation to the main entrance. A narrow narthex and the side wings are covered with hip roofs above which rises a larger-sized drum supporting a dome. The lantern mounted on top of the dome originally was surmounted by the cross, a symbol of Christ’s passion.

The facades feature a reduced number of symmetrically arranged openings. The compact design, important attribute of the architectural school of Hugo Ehrlich and Viktor Kovačić, has townscape value that stems from the building’s successful positioning in relation to a crossroad on the approach to the Historic Core of Zemun. The Evangelical church shows an original, rarely employed and consistently modernist architectural design.

After the end of World War II, all church activities ceased, building was nationalised and served as administrative office for a prolonged period of time in Socialist Yugoslavia. In this period many elements of church's original architecture were altered and cross on top of the dome replaced with five-pointed star, symbol of communism.

Its misuse continued after the breakup of Yugoslavia when it served as a night club and gaming house. Finally in 2004. its historical and cultural value was officially recognised and church declared to be cultural monument under the protection of the state. In the same year Municipality of Zemun decided to return building to its original purpose - to serve Zemun's Evangelical community.

However, at present time Evangelical community is no longer mostly consisted of Germans but of Slovaks. For that reason in 2006. additional agreement regarding jurisdiction was concluded between the German and Slovak Evangelical Church of the Augsburg Confession in Serbia that also received support from Evangelical Church in Württemberg. In November of 2006. first post-war deacon was appointed - Mgr. Vladislav Ivičiak.
