= Novi Karlovci =

Novi Karlovci Нови Карловци (Serbian)
- Village (Selo)
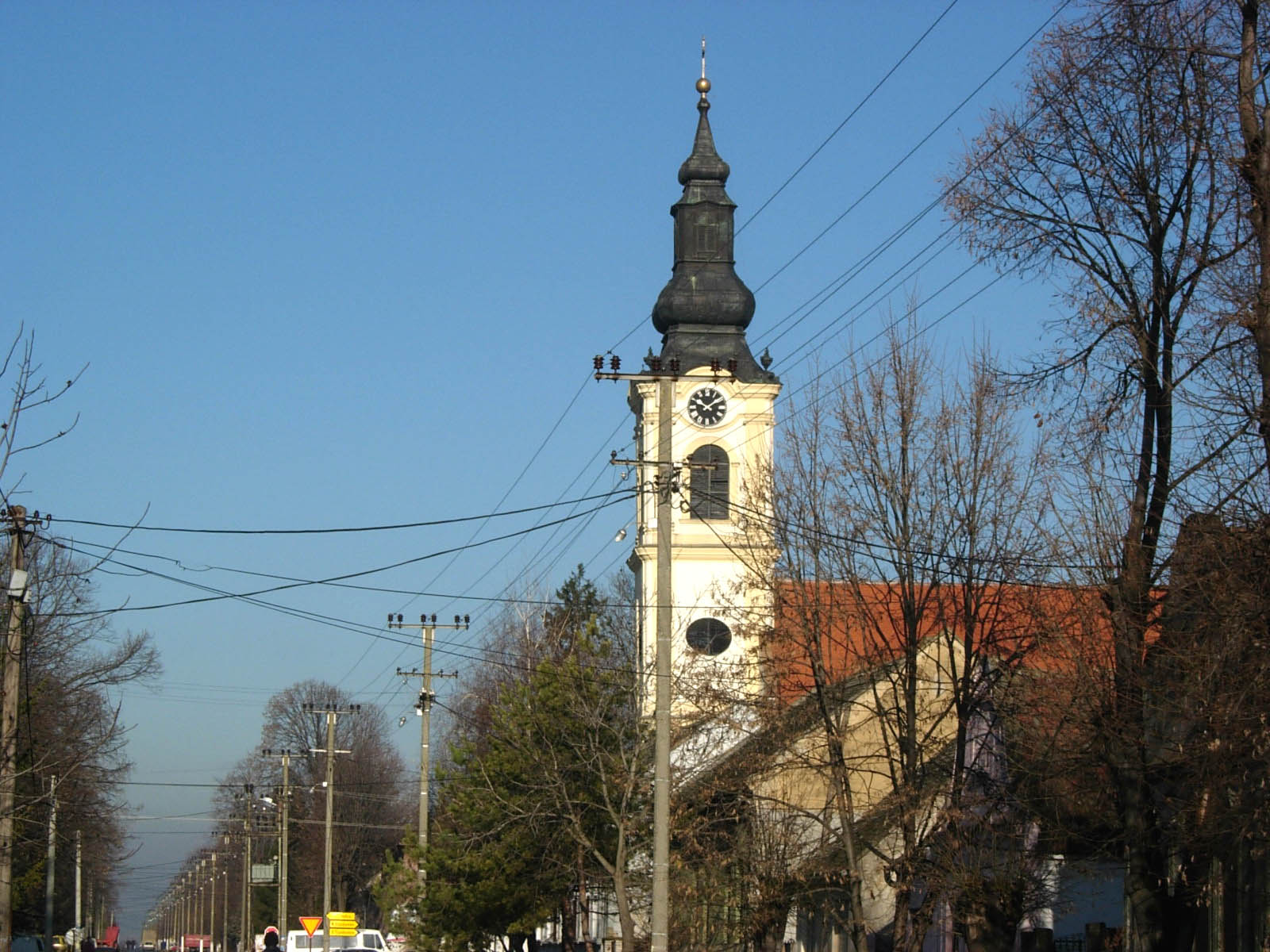
- The Orthodox church.
- Interactive map of Novi Karlovci
- Location within Vojvodina Location within Serbia Location within Europe
- Coordinates: 45°05′N 20°11′E
- Country: Serbia
- Province: Vojvodina
- Region: Syrmia
- District: Srem
- Municipality: Inđija
- Time zone: UTC+1 (CET)
  - Summer (DST): UTC+2 (CEST)

Novi Karlovci (Serbian Cyrillic: Нови Карловци) is a village in Serbia. It is situated in the Autonomous Province of Vojvodina, in the region of Syrmia (Syrmia District), in Inđija municipality. In 2002, its population was 3,036, including 2,897 (95.42%) Serbs.

== Name ==
The name of the village in Serbian is plural.

== Tourism ==
International hiking- and bikingroute Sultans Trail goes thru Novi Karlovci. Both routes follow the old route from Budapest to Istanbul

== Sports ==
The local football club is Polet

== Historical population ==
- 1961: 3,427
- 1971: 3,060
- 1981: 3,050
- 1991: 2,947

== See also ==
- List of places in Serbia
- List of cities, towns and villages in Vojvodina
