= FK Polet Novi Karlovci =

Polet
- Full name: Fudbalski Klub Polet
- Founded: 1927; 99 years ago
- Ground: Novi Karlovci
- Capacity: 100
- Chairman: Starac Dušan
- Manager: Jeftić Petar
- League: Srem League
- 2024-25: Srem League, 9th
Home colours	Away colours

FK Polet is a Serbian football club based in Novi Karlovci, Serbia.

Club has been founded by two brothers which surname is Bajic. Club was founded in 1927. Highest peak was when club was playing in Vojvodjanska Liga. As of the 2025-26 season they play in the 5th-tier Srem League.

== Recent league history ==
Season	Division	P	W	D	L	F	A	Pts	Pos
2020–21	6 - Inter-municipal league Srem - East	30	17	4	9	69	56	55	4th
2021–22	6 - Inter-municipal league Srem - East	24	12	2	10	61	50	38	4th
2022–23	6 - Inter-municipal league Srem - East	26	19	4	3	86	25	61	1st
2023–24	5 - Srem League	30	15	3	12	52	45	48	5th
2024–25	5 - Srem League	30	13	4	13	64	47	43	9th
