= Srijemske Laze =

Srijemske Laze Sremske Laze
- Village (Selo)
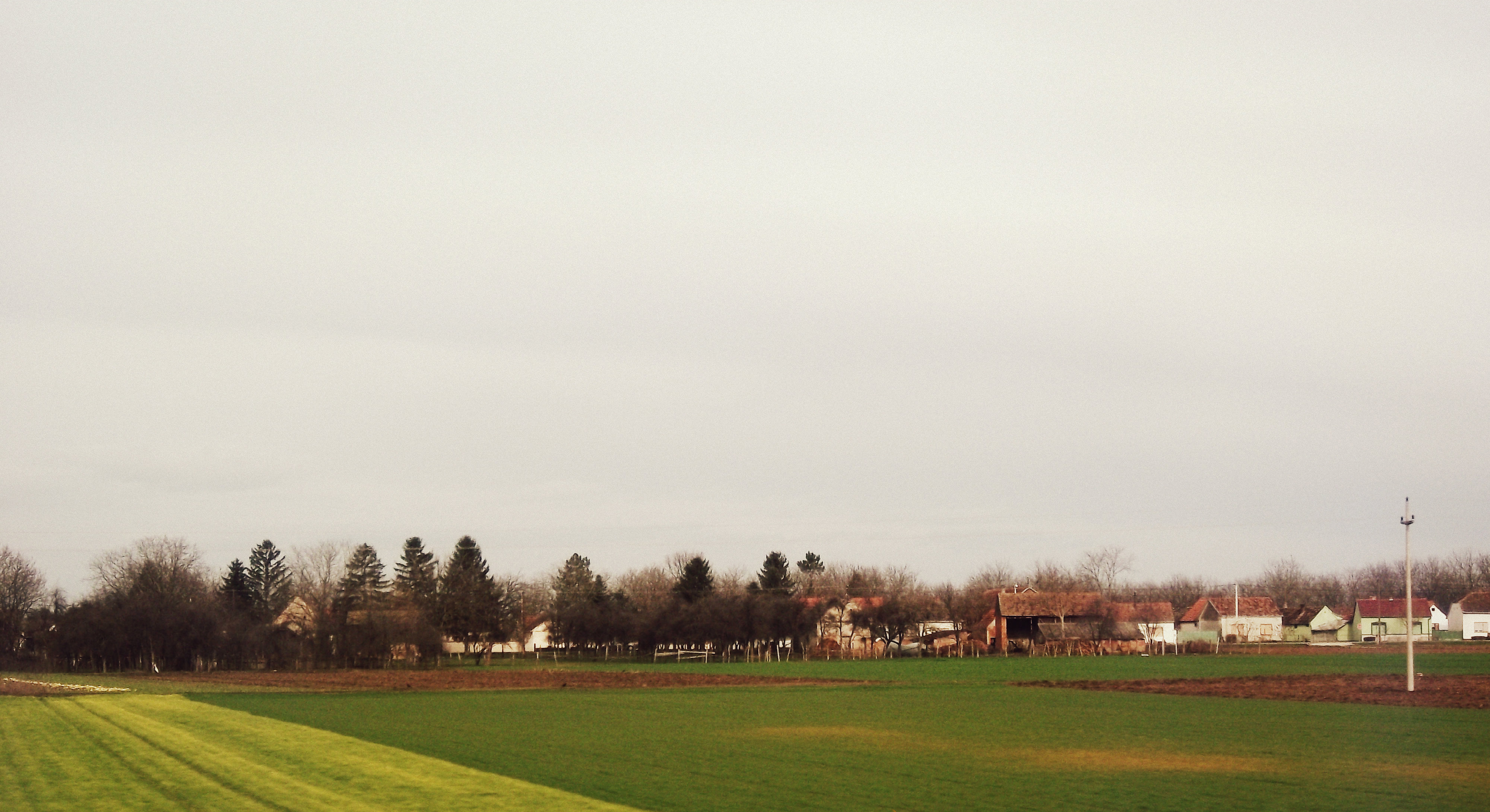
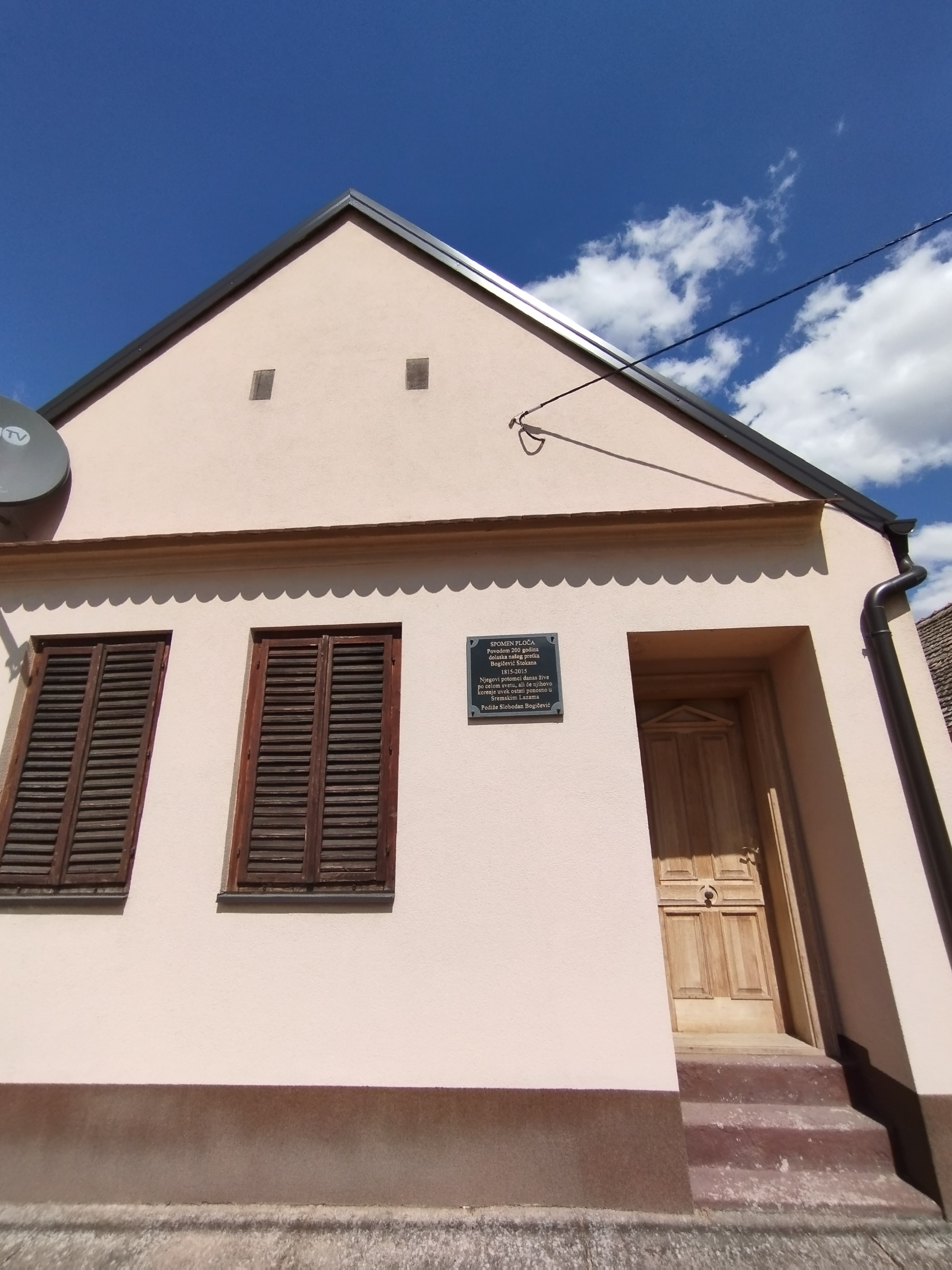
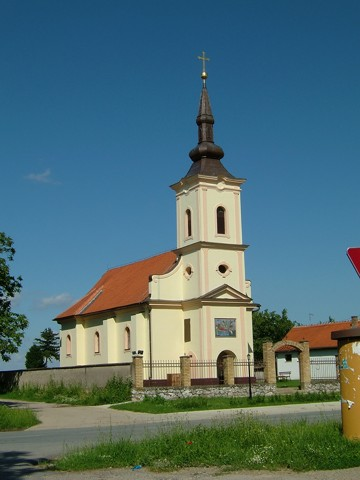
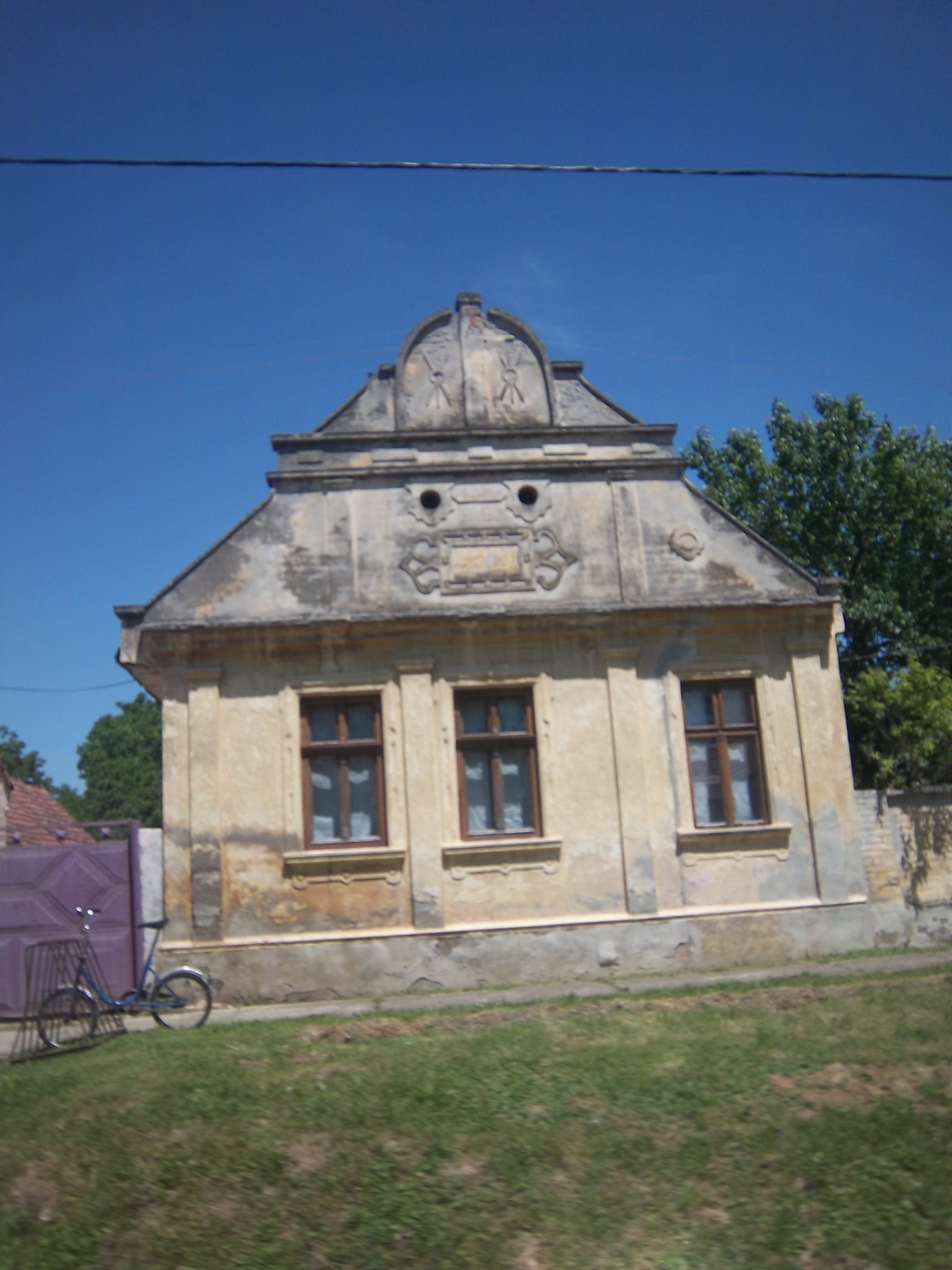
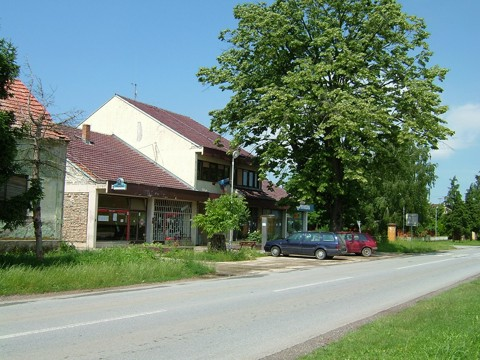
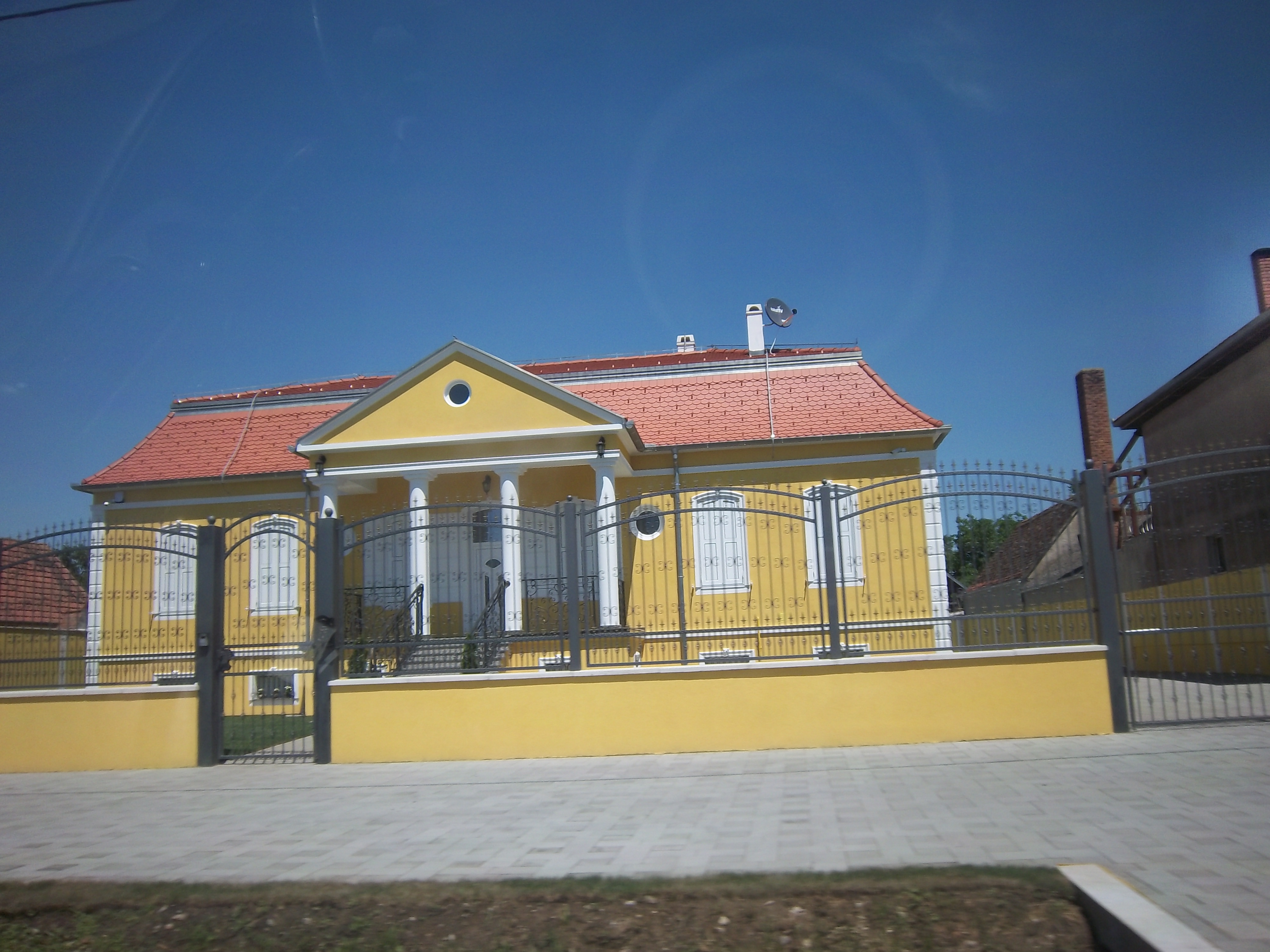
- Nickname: Little Moscow
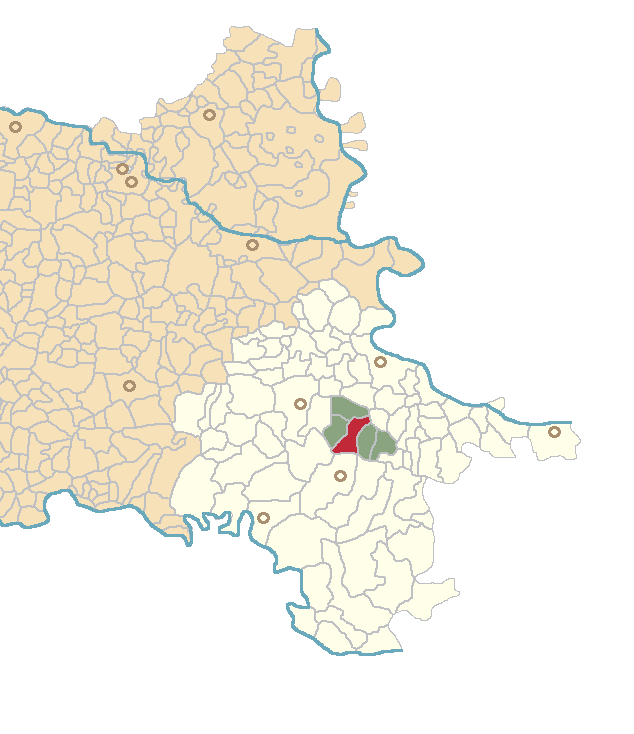

- Location within Vukovar-Syrmia County Location within Croatia Location within Europe
- Coordinates: 45.220934°N 18.955382°E
- Country: Croatia
- Region: Syrmia (Podunavlje)
- County: Vukovar-Syrmia
- Municipality: Stari Jankovci

Government
  - Body: Local Committee

Area
  - Total: 8.8 sq mi (22.9 km^{2})
- Elevation: 305 ft (93 m)

Population (2021)
  - Total: 398
  - Density: 45.0/sq mi (17.4/km^{2})
- Demonym(s): Lazanin (♂) Lazanka (♀) (per grammatical gender)
- Time zone: UTC+1 (CET)
  - Summer (DST): UTC+2 (CEST)
- Postal code: 32 242 Slakovci
- Area code: +385 032
- Vehicle registration: VK

Srijemske Laze (Serbian Cyrillic: Сремске Лазе) is a village in Stari Jankovci municipality of Vukovar-Syrmia County in eastern Croatia. The village is physically connected with the village of Slakovci. According to 2011 census there is 566 residents in the village. The largest ethnic group in the village are Serbs of Croatia. The village is connected with the rest of the country by the D46 state road connecting it with the town of Vinkovci and continuing into Serbia as the State Road 120 to the nearest town of Šid. Surrounding landscape of the village is marked by the Pannonian Basin plains and agricultural fields of wheat, maize, common sunflower and sugar beet.

== Name ==
The name of the village in Croatian or Serbian is plural.

In addition to its official form the name of the village of Srijemske Laze is also known as Sremske Laze in its Ekavian pronunciation of Shtokavian dialect of the pluricentric Serbo-Croatian. Historically, Ekavian pronunciation was common both among autochthonous Serb and Croat communities in Podunavlje while both new post-World War II Serb and Croat settlers predominantly used Ijekavian pronunciation. This however changed in local context after the Croatian War of Independence when Ekavian was associated with Serb and Ijekavian with Croat community with some exceptions.

The word "Srijemske"/"Sremske" is a possessive adjective derived from the Serbo-Croatian word for the Syrmia region itself, meaning that the literal translation of the settlement's name in English is Syrmia's Laze. The name of the village comes from the old Croatian word ''laz'', which means a part of the hillside that can be overcome on foot.

== Geography ==
Southern edge of administrative area of village bordering Bosut river. North of the river is oak forest and after forest there are large agricultural fields. Between village itself and the southern part of administrative area village lying Zagreb–Belgrade railway. Through the village passing D46 highway. At the eastern end, village is physically connected to the neighboring village Slakovci. The village is part of Pannonian sub-region of Syrmia. The area of village is completely flat, gently sloped from slightly higher north to lower south. Word Srijemske in village name comes from Eastern Herzegovinian, Shtokavian dialect of Serbo-Croatian word for region of Syrmia.

== History ==
=== Middle Ages ===
In the Middle Ages modern village area were populated by Catholic population. Name of place that than existed was Laz. Origin of old village name comes from Croat word laz, which means the low gentle hill that man can easily exceed walking. Catholic village Laz which was just south of the present day village, was abandoned under the influence of Ottoman Empire in the 17th century.

=== Resettlement ===
After the liberation from the Ottoman Empire following the 1699 Treaty of Karlowitz, the Franciscans from Srijemski Laz took most of the population to Vukovar where they built the Church of Saints Philip and James, while a smaller part of the population moved to Jankovci and Slakovci. Even today, descendants of natives from Laz with the surname Lazanin live in these villages. Between 1690s and 1720s the village was abandoned when it was resettled by Eastern Orthodox population. Following Ottoman retreat from the region, the Lordship of Vukovar was established, and the village became part of its domain in 1716 until 1737 when it was transferred back to Slavonian Military Frontier. Since after the Ottoman Empire village remained deserted and empty, Austrian Empire in early 18th century inhabited village with Serbs mostly from eastern Bosnia (from Bijeljina and Zvornik) and southwestern Hungary. In 1719 locals built a wooden church of All saint Arhistratiz's, which on 18 June 1752 was consecrated by episkopos Partenije. In that period under the parish belonged also Orthodox families from neighboring village Jankovci until in new village wasn't built Orthodox church.

=== Administrative changes up the collapse of Austro-Hungary ===
In 1701 village administratively became part of Military Frontier. In 1716 village become part of Vukovar Seigniory in Kingdom of Slavonia. In 1745 during the final delimitation between Vukovar Seigniory and Military Frontier village again become part of Military Frontier. In 1848 and 1849 village was part of short-lived self-proclaimed Serbian autonomous region Serbian Vojvodina. Village stay part of Military Frontier until 1881 and unification of Croatian and Slavonian Military Frontier into Kingdom of Croatia-Slavonia. When in 1873 Military Frontier was demilitarized village become part of Mirkovci municipality and then village name got geographical prefix Srijemske so that it can be distinguished from other four villages in Kingdom of Croatia-Slavonia with that name.

=== Kingdom of Yugoslavia ===
At the end of the First World War Srijemske Laze become part of short-lived unrecognized State of Slovenes, Croats and Serbs that joined the Kingdom of Serbia to form the Kingdom of Serbs, Croats and Slovenes that will later change its name into Kingdom of Yugoslavia. In that period wider region was shortly part of Drina Banovina with capital in Sarajevo, but than become part of Sava Banovina that letter become part of autonomous Banovina of Croatia. Narrower region was part of the Syrmia County till 1924 and then Syrmia Oblast.

=== World War II ===
During World War II village was part of Nazi puppet Independent State of Croatia and Vuka county within it. In 1941 in village lived about 900 inhabitants, out of which during the World War II 300 took part in Yugoslav Partisans and 150 were killed. During the war village was permanent safe place for partisans that because of that call it Little Moscow. At that time in village was created two days of remembrance and celebration of that period. These were Socialist Slava (22 August) and Day of the Dead (14 October). Socialist Slava was created in memory of year 1943, when about 120 people went to partisans, and Day of the Dead commemorate the 56 villagers killed on 14 October 1944 when Ustaše launched a punitive expedition aimed at the destruction of partisan nests.

=== War in Croatia and peaceful reintegration ===
During the war in Croatia Srijemske Laze was within self-proclaimed Serb political entity SAO Eastern Slavonia, Baranja and Western Syrmia. In the final stages of conflict United Nations Mission conducted peaceful reintegration of this region into Croatian jurisdiction. Population in Srijemske Laze decreased from 1991 till 2001 for 29.4%.

== Demographics ==
The village is faced with the challenge of population decline. The process was initiated by industrialization and urbanization already in the period of the existence of the SFR Yugoslavia and intensified by the post-Croatian War of Independence socioeconomic situation. Population decline further intensified in the aftermath of the 2013 enlargement of the European Union with emigration to Germany, Ireland, Scandinavia and other parts of the EU.

== Politics ==
In Srijemske Laze there are local committees of Independent Democratic Serb Party and New Serbian Party.

== Culture ==
Every year on Christmas Eve (December 24), residents in the churchyard have a bonfire for "Badnjak", the Croatian word for Christmas Eve. In this occasion locals take oak trees from the area and make a ritual fire.

== Education ==
Branch school of Elementary school Stari Jankovci is located in Srijemske Laze. Education at local school is carried out in Croatian.

== Gallery ==
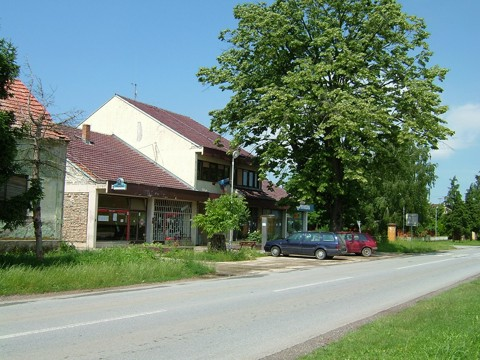

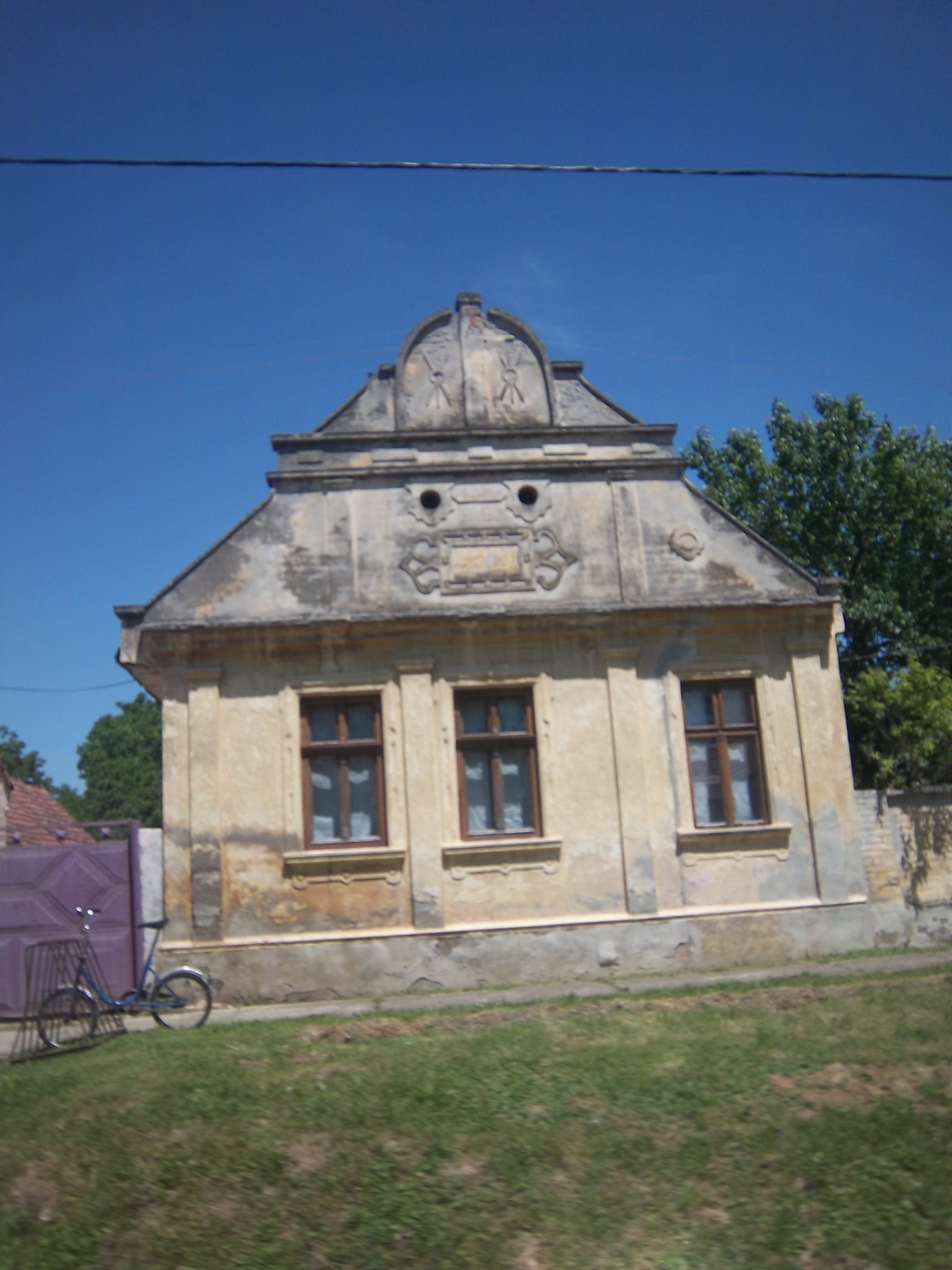

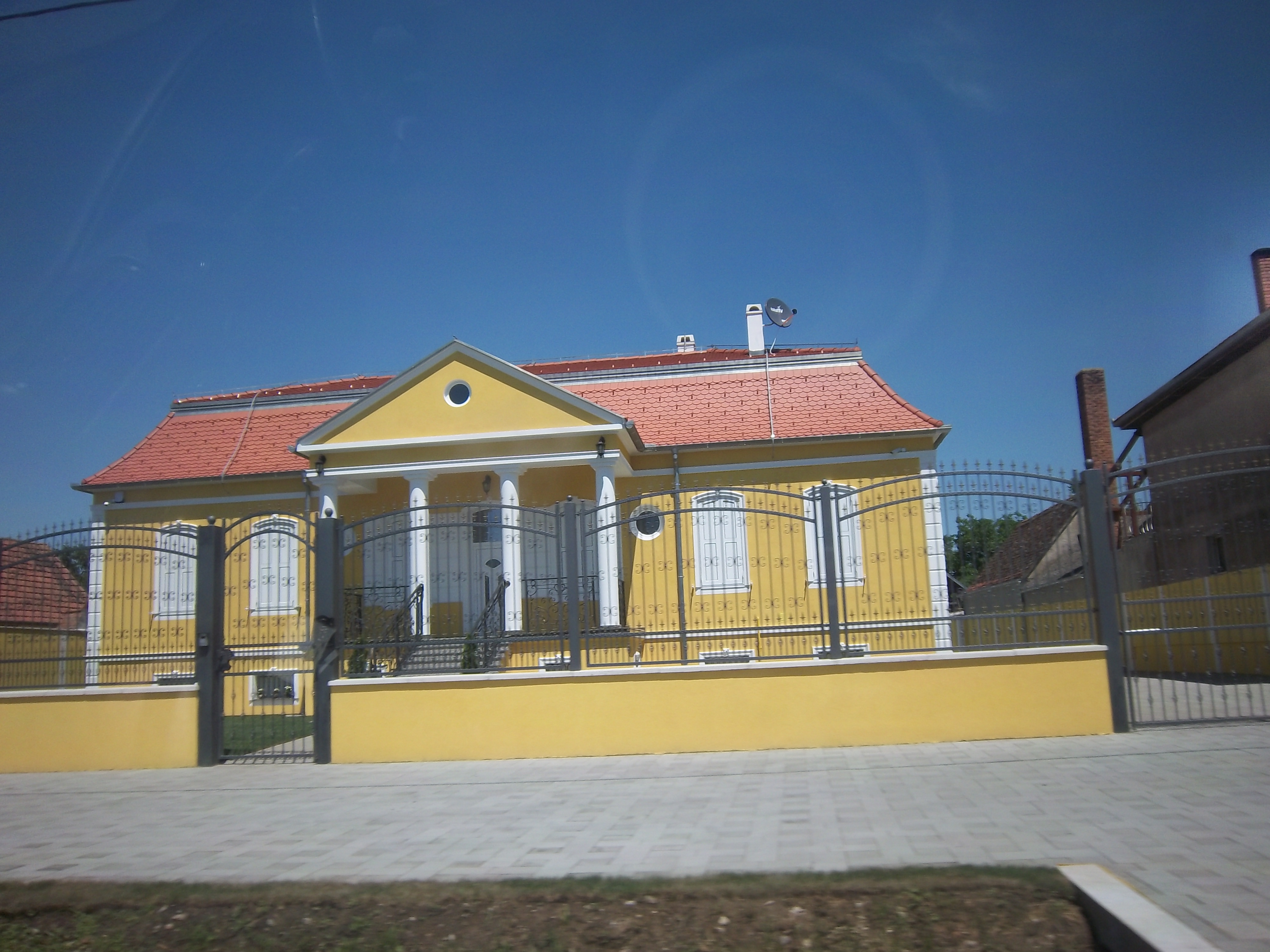

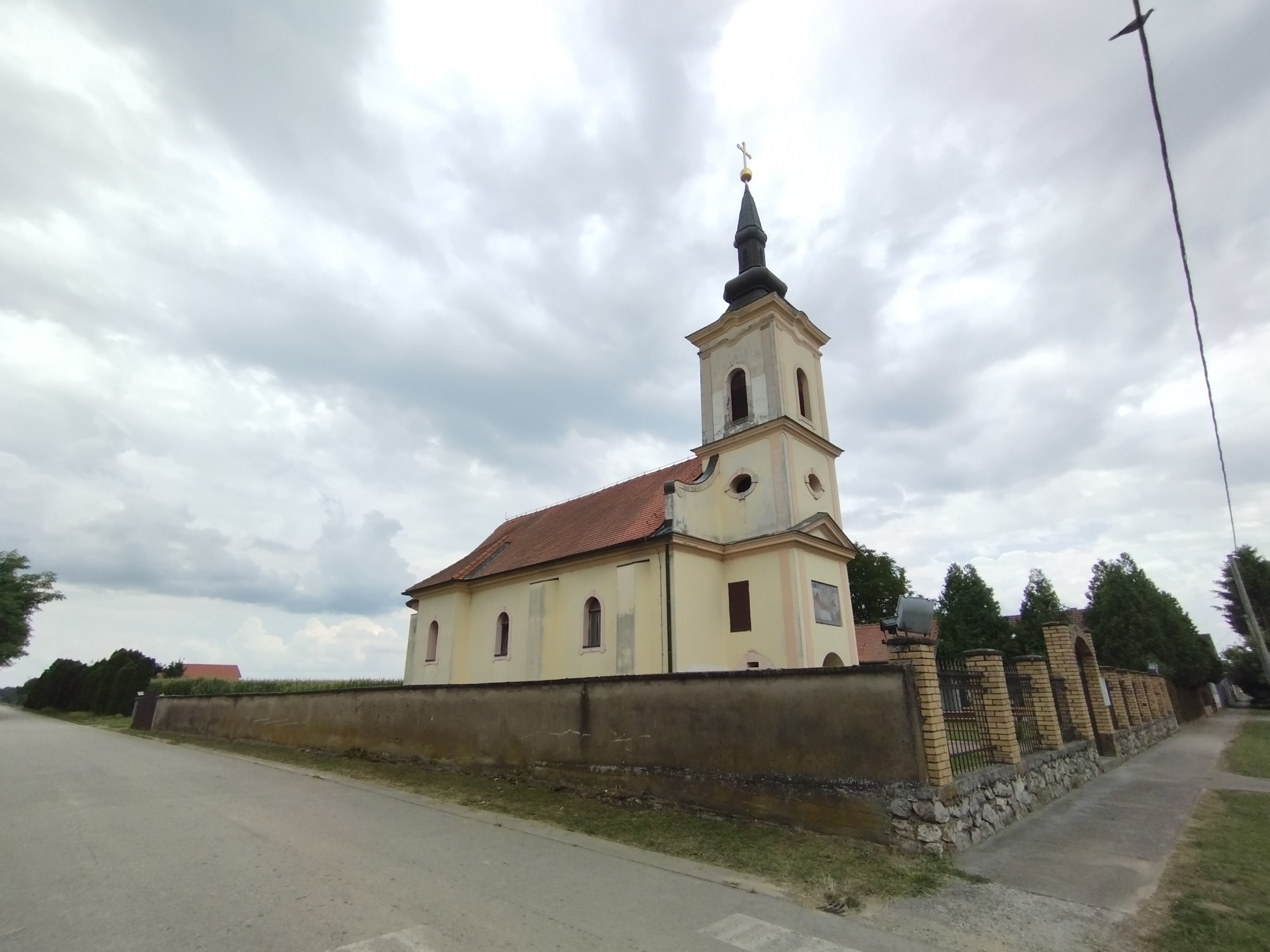
Church of the Nativity of the Virgin, Srijemske Laze

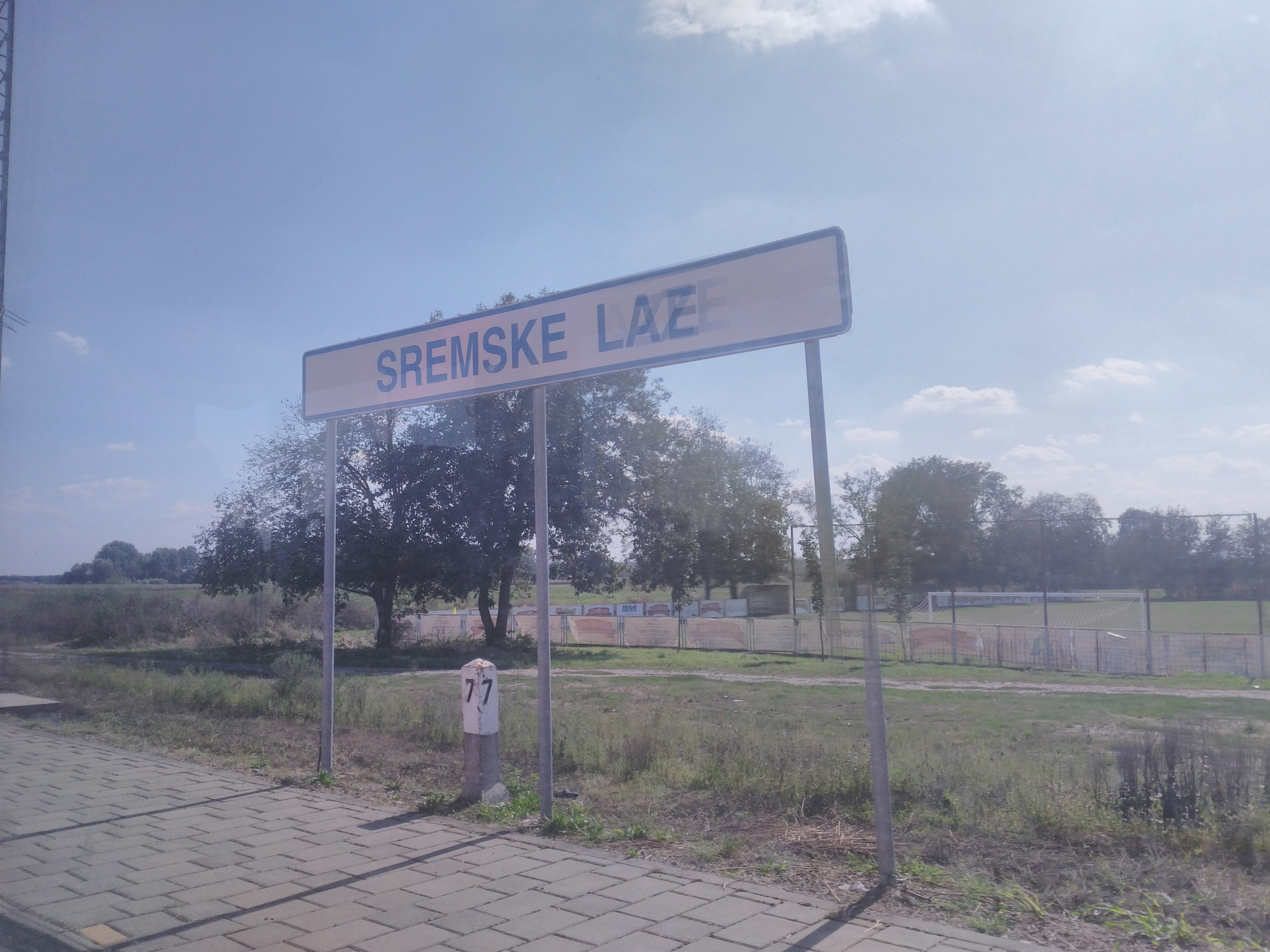
Sremske Laze railway station

== See also ==
- Church of the Nativity of the Virgin, Srijemske Laze
- Sremske Laze railway station
- Stari Jankovci municipality
