= Sremske Laze railway station =

Railway station in Croatia

Sremske Laze
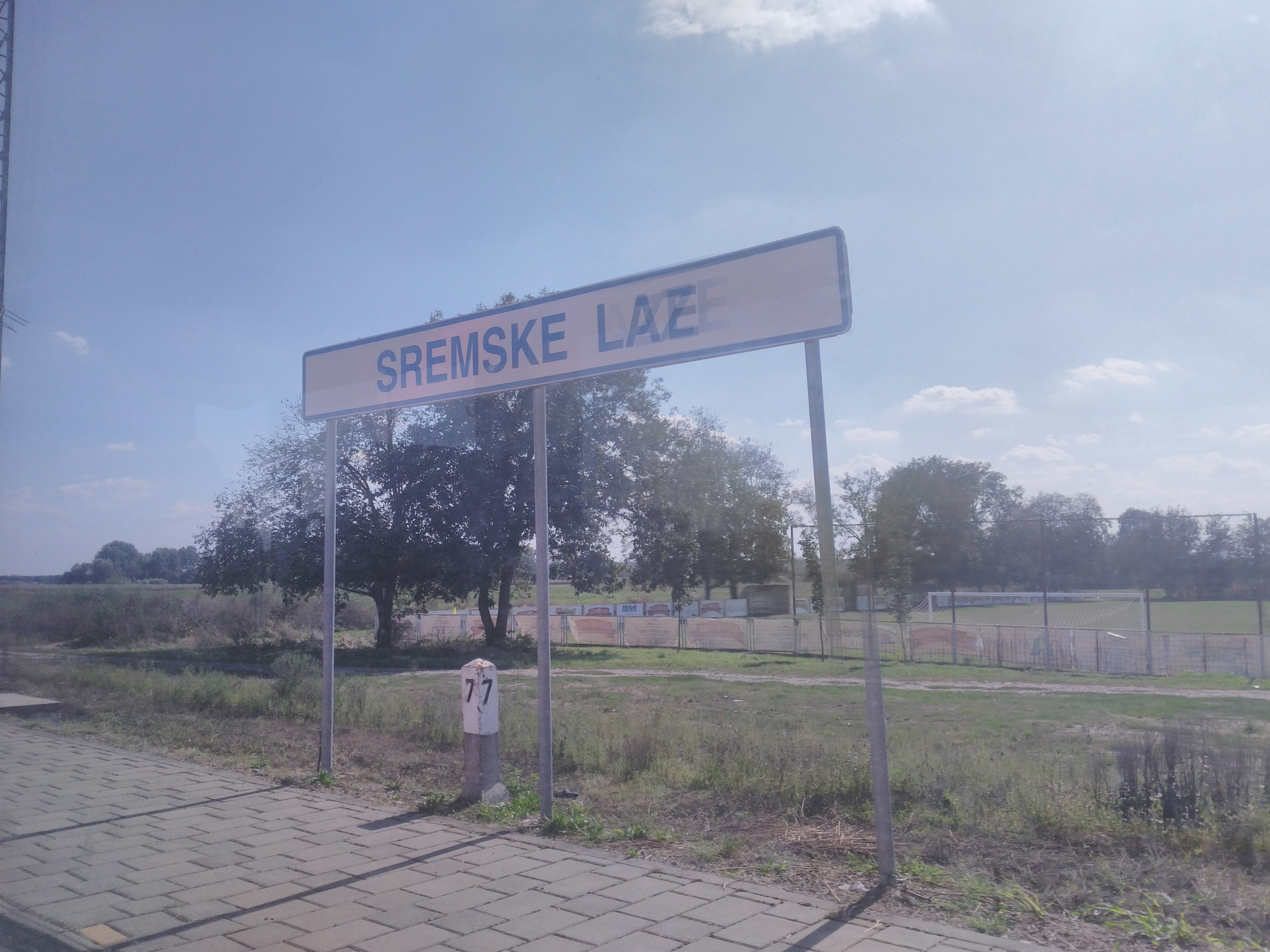

General information
- Location: Srijemske Laze; Vukovar-Syrmia County; Croatia
- Coordinates: 45.2271°N 18.9279°E
- Operator: Croatian Railways
- Line: M104 railway (Croatia)
- Platforms: 2 high platforms
- Tracks: 2
- Connections: No direct public transport available. Bus station with limited local connections located in the center of the settlement.

Construction
- Parking: Limited free public parking
Location

Sremske Laze railway station (Croatian: Željezničko stajalište Sremske Laze, Serbian Cyrillic: Железничко стајалиште Сремске Лазе) is a railway stop in Croatia. The station is operated by Croatian Railways, the state-owned railway company. It is located in Srijemske Laze.

On 19 January 2012 reconstruction of the Sremske Laze railway station was completed. It was a part of reconstruction of nine railway stations on 67 kilometer route between Vinkovci and Tovarnik-Croatia–Serbia border funded from the Instrument for Pre-Accession Assistance of the European Union (48%) and Croatian Government (52%).

== Name of the station ==
The name of the train station uses the name of the village of Srijemske Laze in its Ekavian pronunciation of Shtokavian dialect, the prestige dialect of the pluricentric Serbo-Croatian language. Historically, Ekavian pronunciation was common both among autochthonous Serb and Croat communities in Podunavlje while both new post-World War II Serb and Croat settlers predominantly used Ijekavian pronunciation. This however changed in local context after the Croatian War of Independence when Ekavian was associated with Serb and Ijekavian with Croat community with some exceptions. As Croatian standard uses Ijekavian pronunciation exclusively the official name of the village was turned into Srijemske Laze, while the same change was not implemented by Croatian Railways which continued to use common local name of the village. This led to slight difference in spelling between the official name of the village and official name of the train station.

== See also ==
- Orient Express which used the line on which the station is located.
  - Strizivojna–Vrpolje railway station (the location of murder in the Murder on the Orient Express)
- Vinkovci railway station
- Zagreb–Belgrade railway
- Church of the Nativity of the Theotokos, Srijemske Laze

Preceding station	Sremske Laze train station	Following station
Jankovci	M104 railway (Croatia); Novska to Tovarnik route	Slakovci
