= Stari Jankovci =

- Municipality
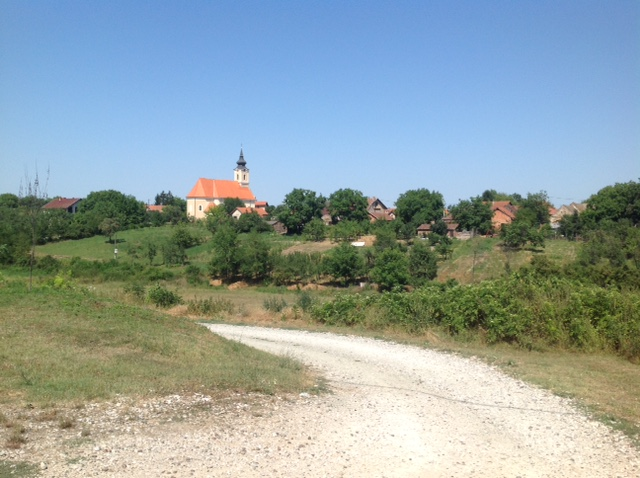
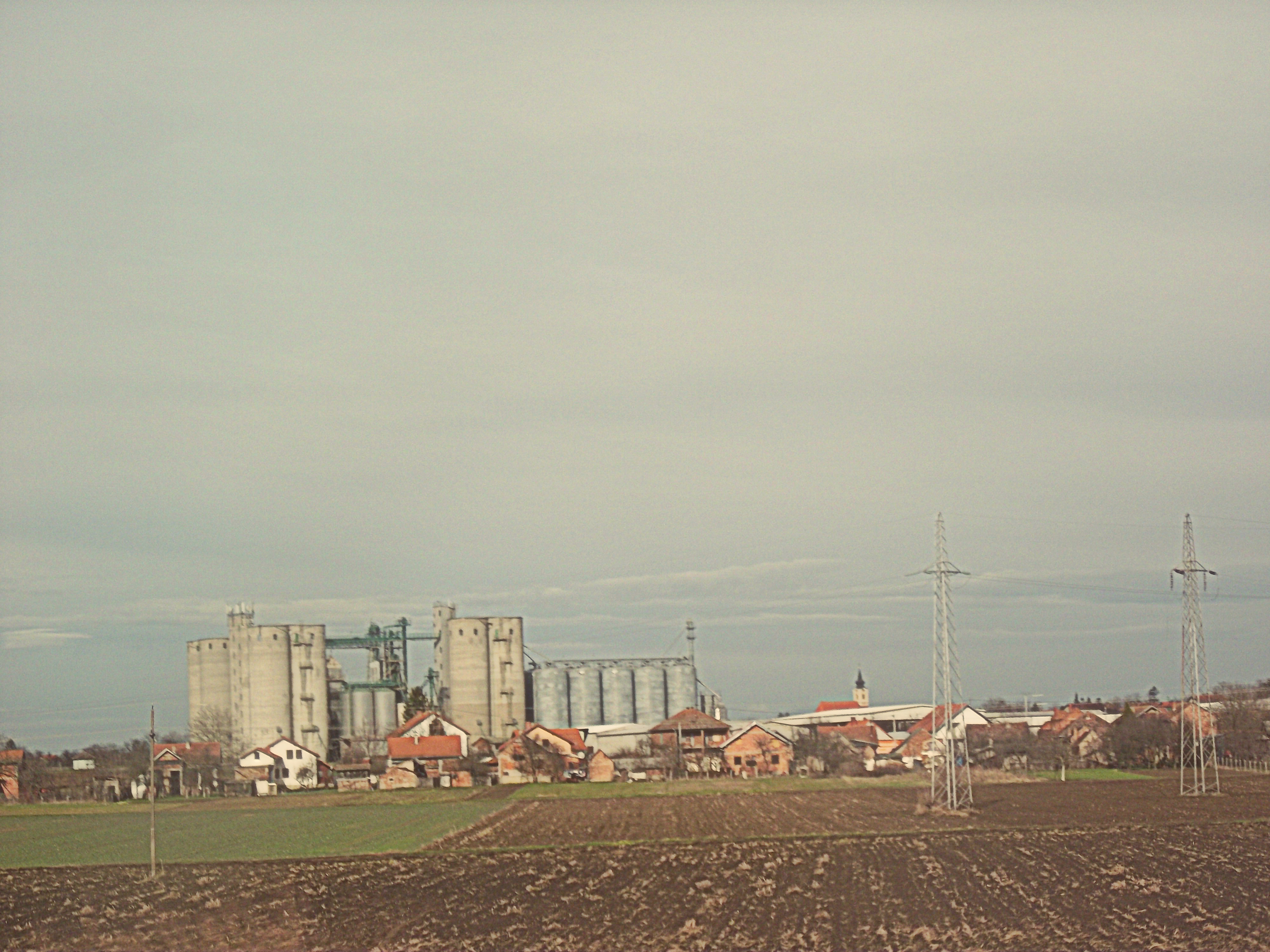
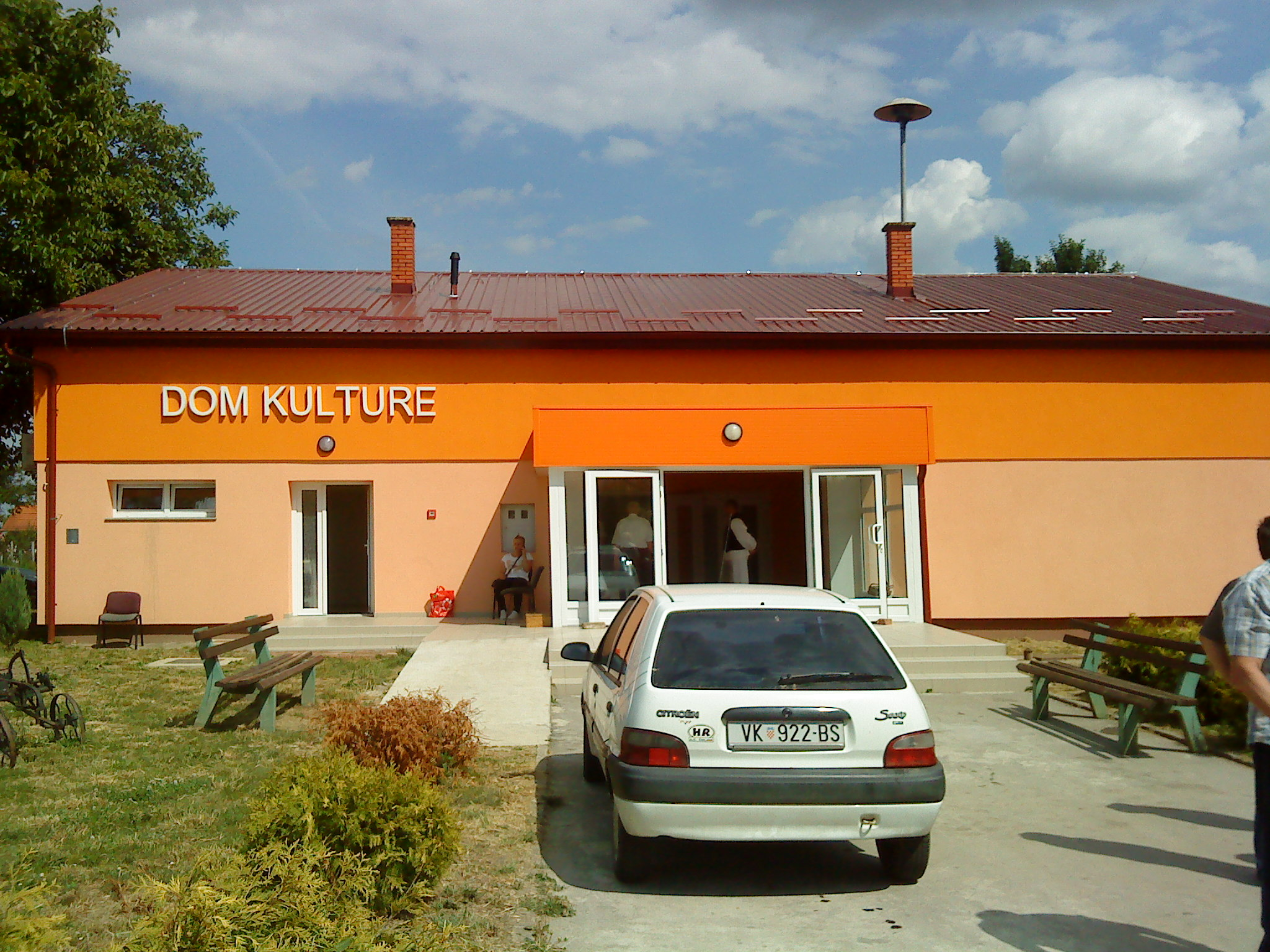
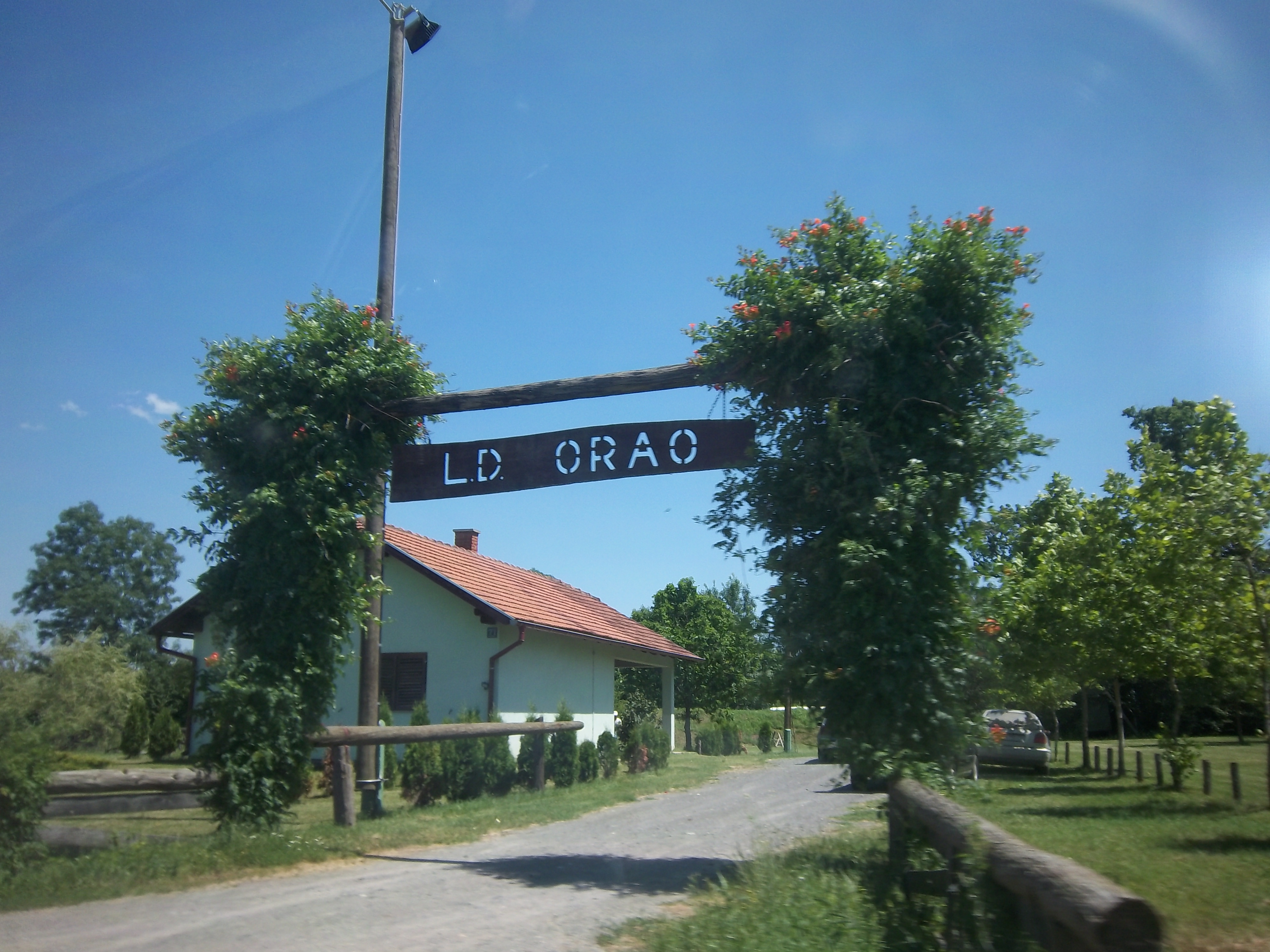
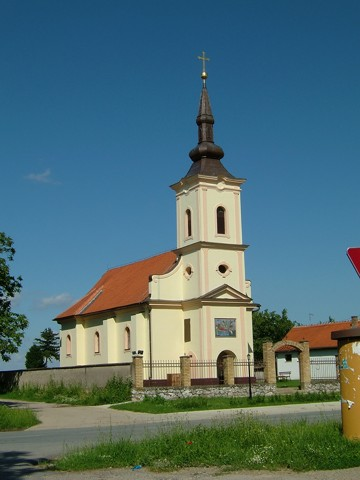
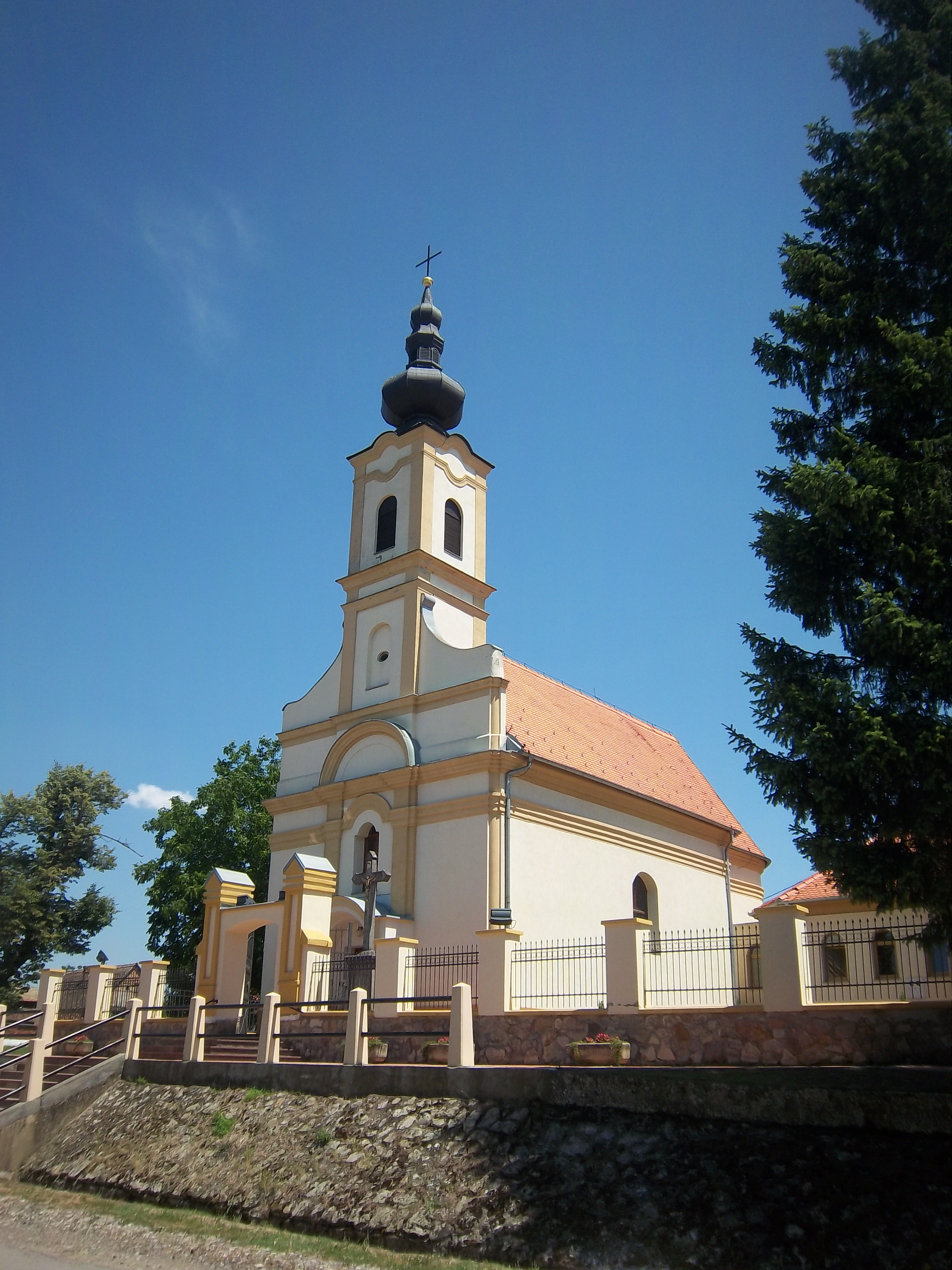
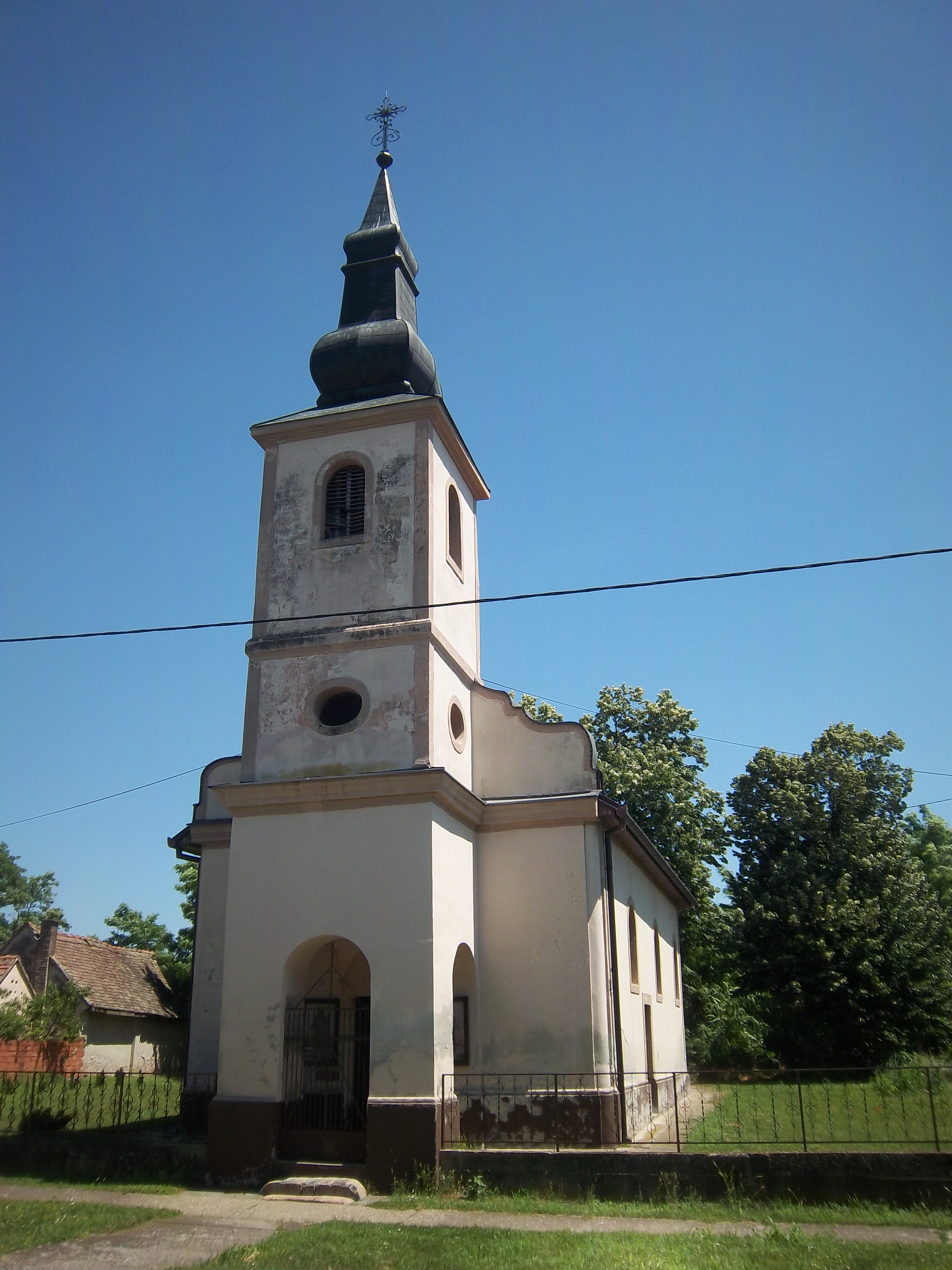
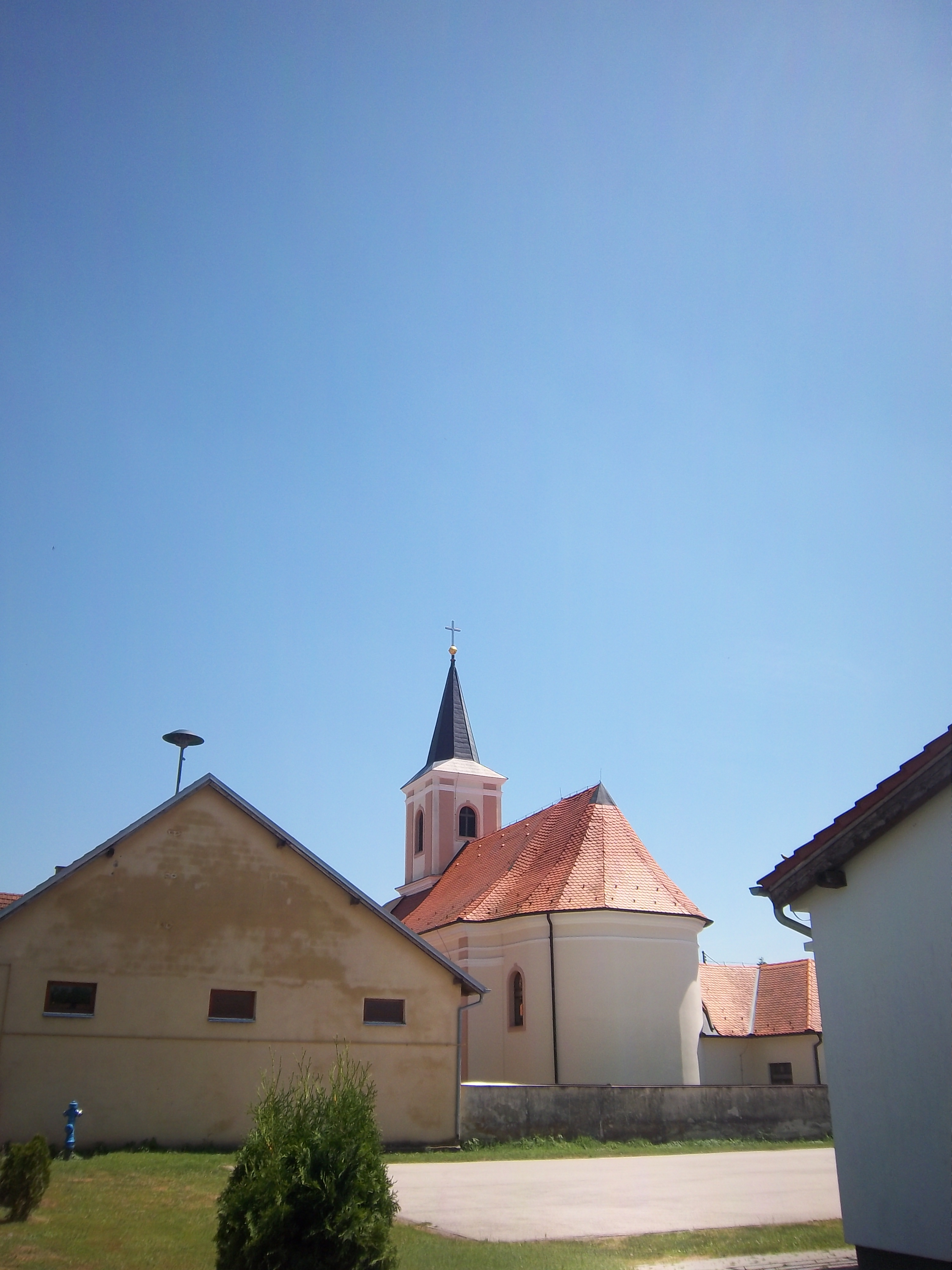
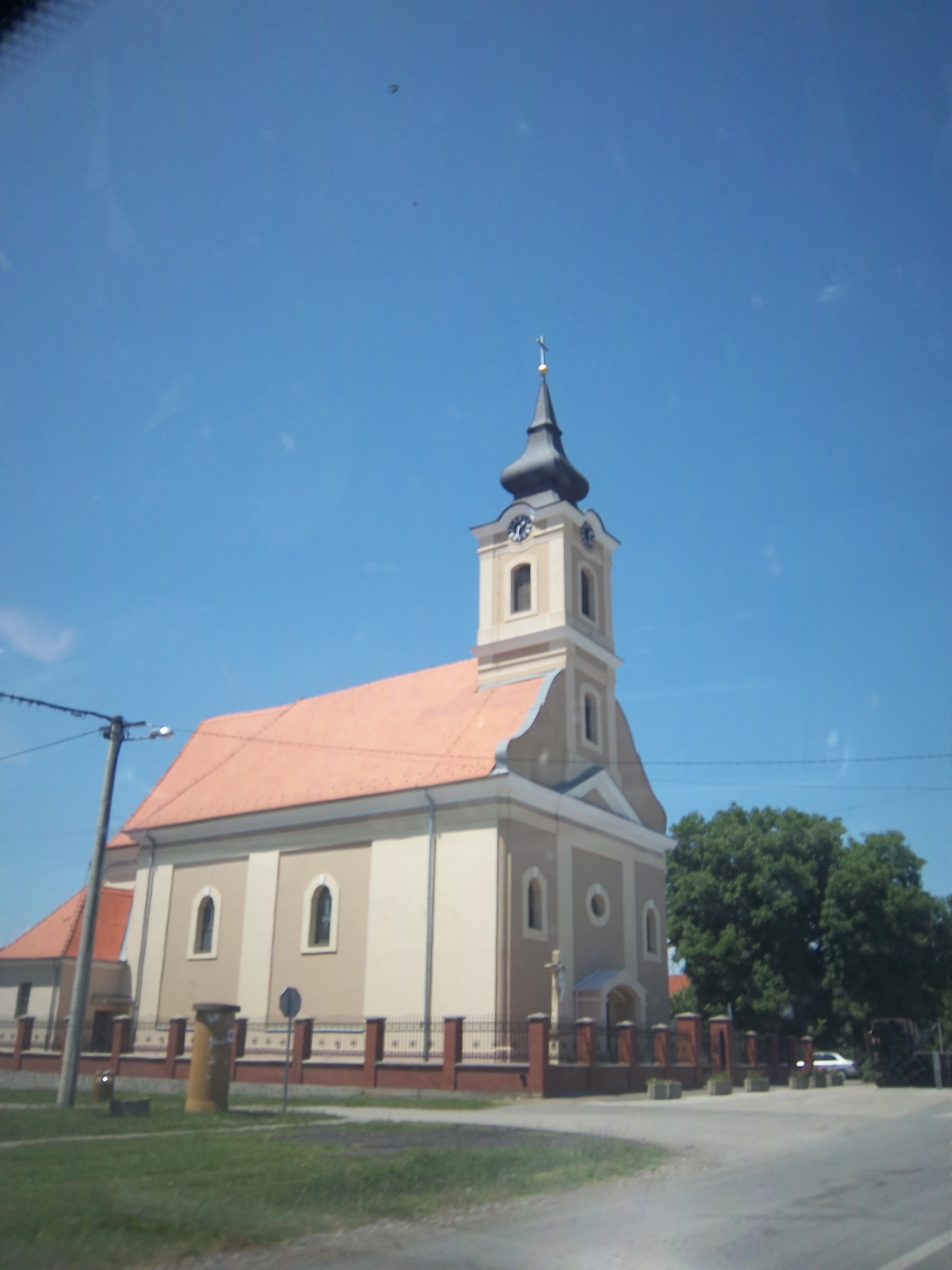
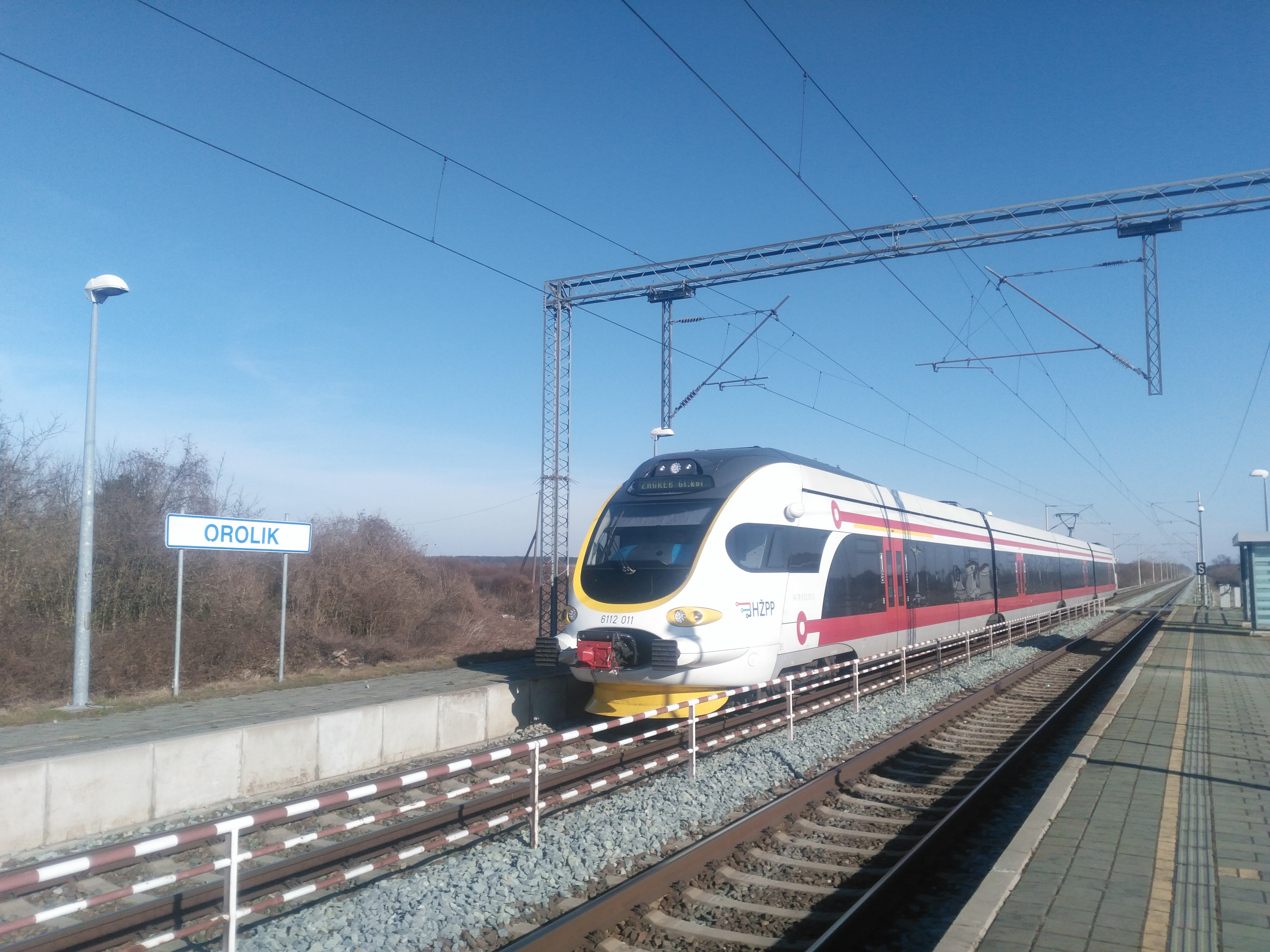
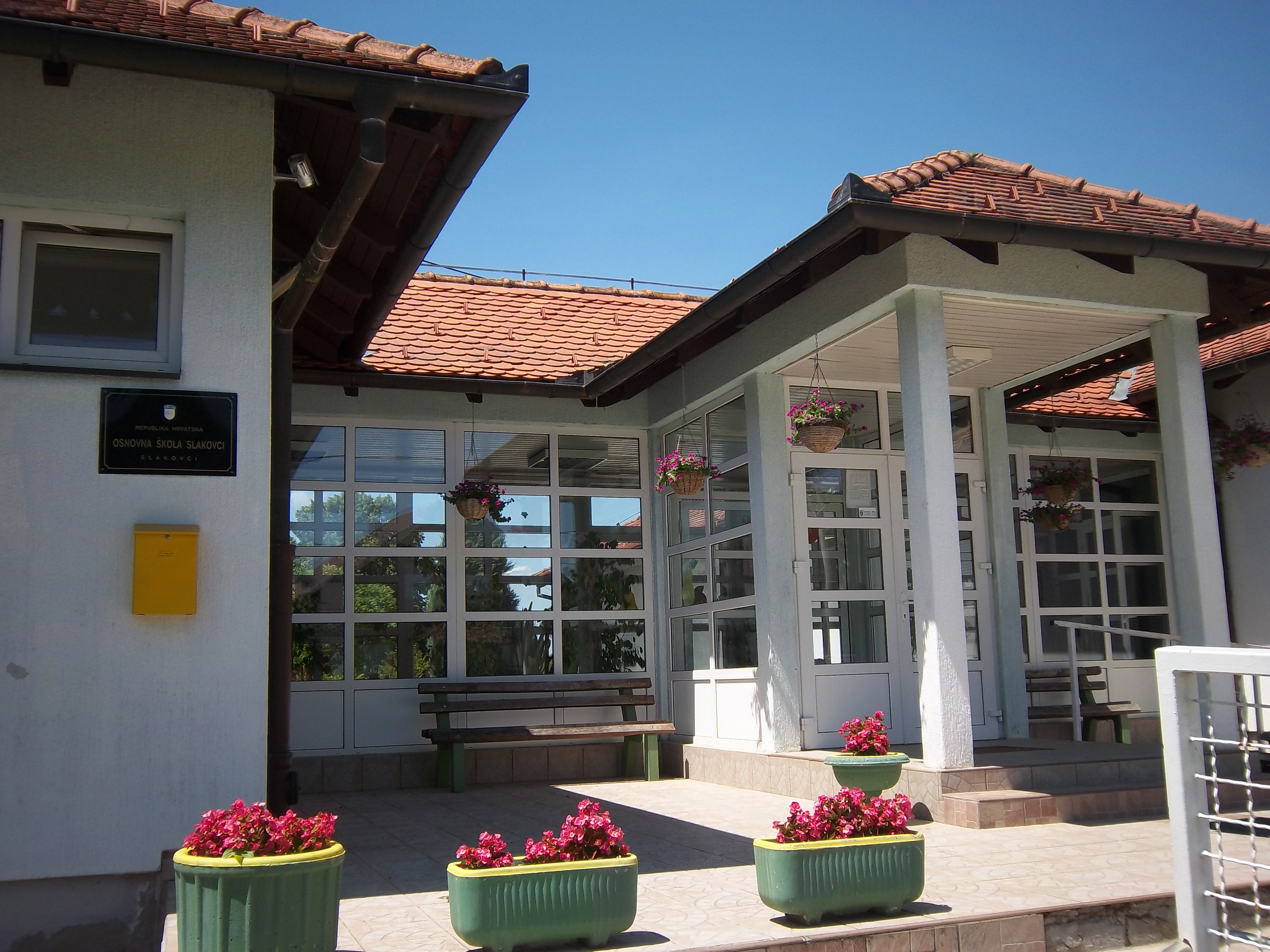
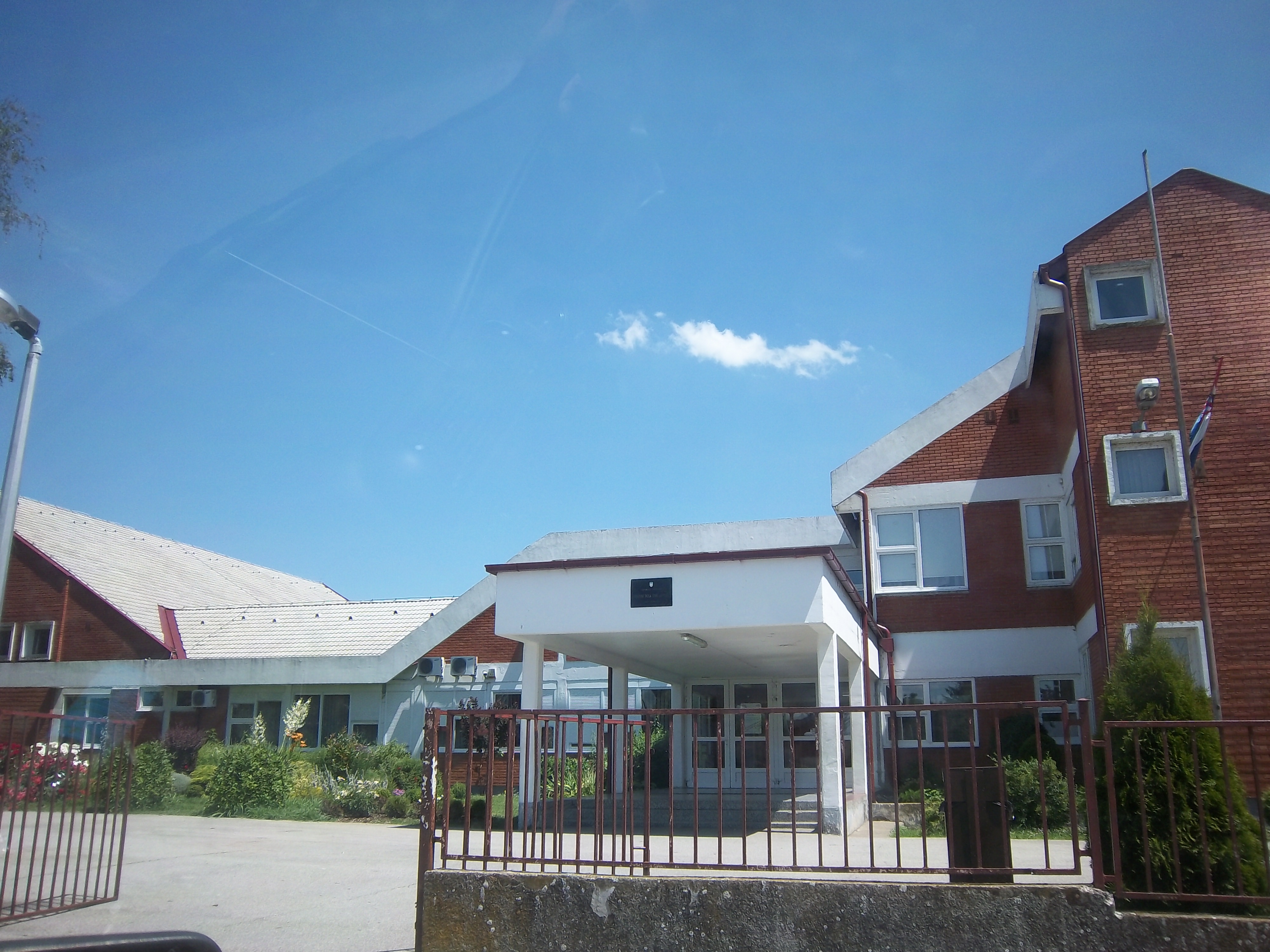
- Villages of the Municipality of Stari Jankovci

- Flag Seal

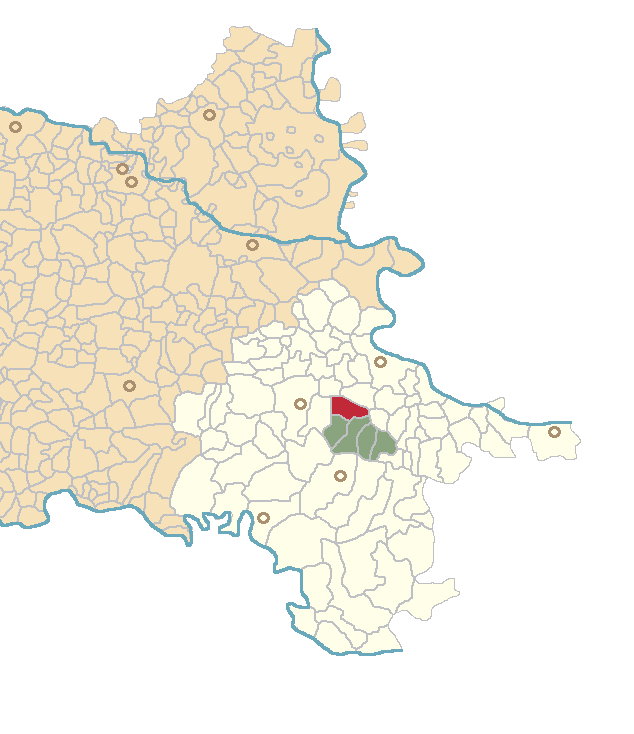

- Location in Croatia Stari Jankovci (Croatia) Stari Jankovci (Europe)
- Coordinates: 45°16′N 18°55′E
- Country: Croatia
- Region: Syrmia (Podunavlje)
- County: Vukovar-Syrmia County

Government
  - Municipal mayor: Ivo Lozić (HDZ)

Area
  - Municipality: 95.2 km^{2} (36.8 sq mi)
  - Urban: 19.6 km^{2} (7.6 sq mi)

Population (2021)
  - Municipality: 3,271
  - Density: 34.4/km^{2} (89.0/sq mi)
  - Urban: 1,124
  - Urban density: 57.3/km^{2} (149/sq mi)
- Demonym(s): Jankovčanin (♂) Jankovčanka (♀) (per grammatical gender)
- Time zone: UTC+1 (CET)
  - Summer (DST): UTC+2 (CEST)
- Postal code: ?
- Area code: 32
- Vehicle registration: VK
- Website: o-jankovci.hr

Stari Jankovci (Serbian Cyrillic: Стари Јанковци, Hungarian: Ivanóc) is a village and a municipality in Vukovar-Syrmia County, Croatia

The village is located to the northeast of the M104 railway route. The village is connected with the rest of the country by the D46 state road connecting it with the town of Vinkovci and continuing into Serbia as the State Road 120 to the nearest town of Šid.

== Population ==
The population is distributed in the following settlements:

- Novi Jankovci, population 934
- Orolik, population 512
- Slakovci, population 958
- Srijemske Laze, population 572
- Stari Jankovci, population 1,429

The total municipality population was 5,216 in 2001, with 69.50% Croats, 23.24% Serbs and 5.06% Hungarians.

== History ==
Following Ottoman retreat from the region, the Lordship of Vukovar was established, and the village became part of its domain.

During the Croatian War of Independence, the village was occupied by the rebel Serbs in 1991. The parish church of Blessed Virgin Mary, built in 1780 with a notable Baroque-Classical main altar, was severely damaged.

Stari Jankovci is an underdeveloped municipality which is statistically classified as the First Category Area of Special State Concern by the Government of Croatia.

== Name ==
The name Stari Jankovci means Old Jankovci, while to the southwest there is a smaller village of Novi Jankovci, meaning New Jankovci.

The name of the village in Croatian is plural.

== History ==
Traces of continuous human settlement at the area of the municipality are investigated at two prehistoric settlements and one necropolis, one archaeological site from antiquity and medieval necropolis "Balkan". In the area of Jankovci, there was a larger estate whose owner was the nobleman Herka around 1260, and after him duke Pavle Gorjanski. The Turks ruled the Jankovci area from 1526 to 1688. After the departure of the Turks, the Jankovci were part of the Vukovar Manor until 1945 and belonged to civilian Croatia.

== Politics ==
=== Municipal government ===
The municipality assembly is composed of 15 representatives. As of 2009, the member parties/lists are:

Party	Number of votes	Number of seats
Croatian Democratic Union	611	5
Independent Democratic Serb Party	433	3
Croatian Peasant Party	356	3
Independent municipal list-Tado Antukić	291	2
Croatian Democratic Alliance of Slavonia and Baranja	132	1
Croatian Party of Rights	115	1

=== Minority councils ===
Directly elected minority councils and representatives are tasked with consulting tasks for the local or regional authorities in which they are advocating for minority rights and interests, integration into public life and participation in the management of local affairs. At the 2023 Croatian national minorities councils and representatives elections Hungarians and Serbs of Croatia fulfilled legal requirements to elect 10 members minority councils of the Stari Jankovci Municipality with Hungarians electing full and Serbs 9 members council in the end.

Preserving traditional minority place names and assigning street names to minority historical figures is legally mandated and carried out for both Hungarian and Serbian.

== See also ==
- Jankovci railway station
