= Church of Saint Anne, Slakovci =

Church of Saint Anne
- Župna crkva Svete Ane
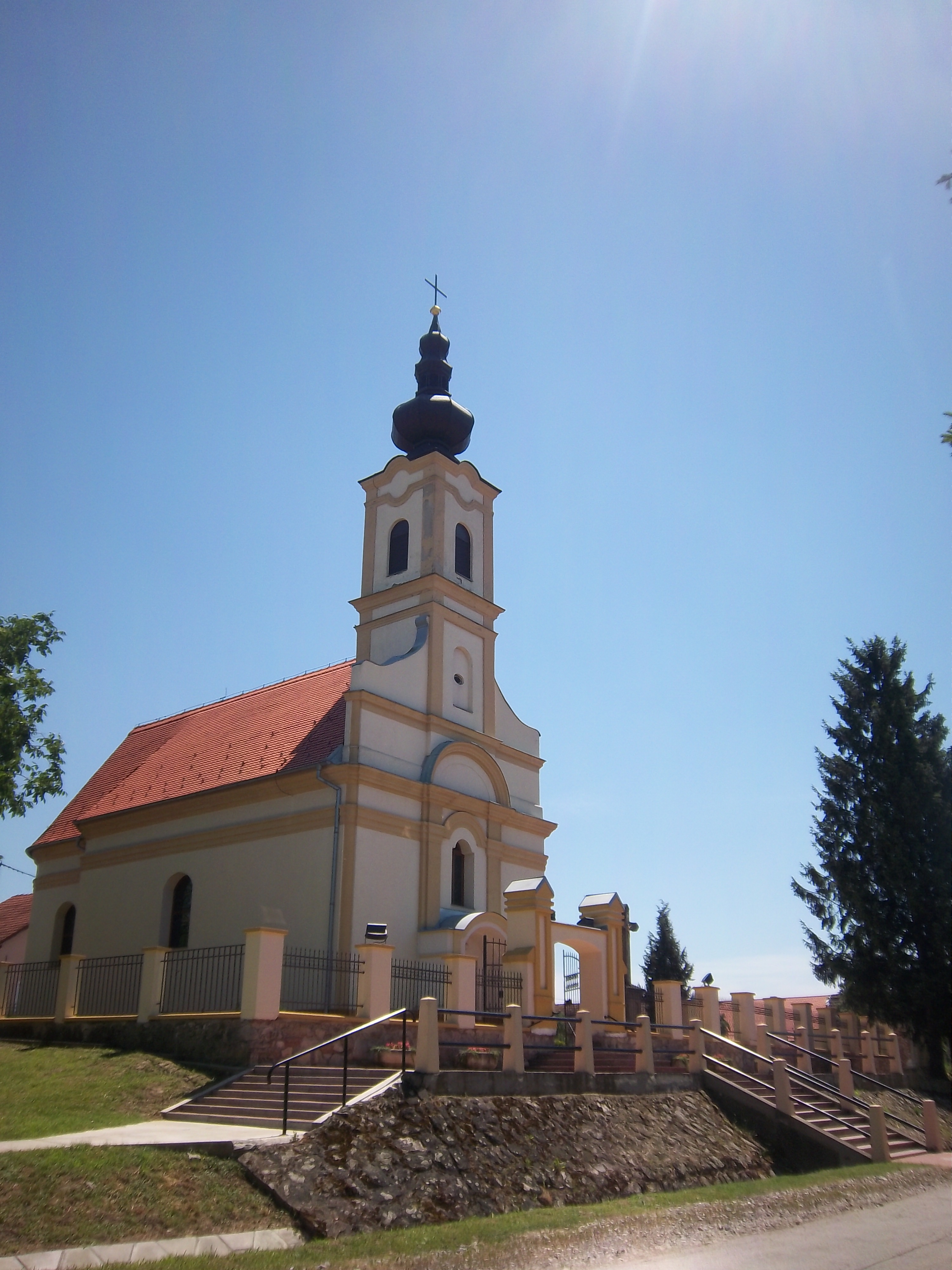
- Church of Saint Anne

- Shown within Vukovar-Srijem County Church of Saint Anne (Croatia)
- 45°13′34″N 18°57′8″E
- Location: Slakovci, Vukovar-Srijem County
- Country: Croatia
- Denomination: Roman Catholic

History
- Dedication: Saint Anne

Architecture
- Style: Neoclassicism
- Years built: 1781

Administration
- Archdiocese: Roman Catholic Archdiocese of Đakovo-Osijek

Church of Saint Anne (Croatian: Župna crkva Svete Ane, Latin: Ecclesia parochiali S. Annae, German: St.-Anna-Kirche) is a Roman Catholic Parish church in Slakovci in Vukovar-Srijem County in eastern Croatia. The church was constructed in 1781. The local parish was established in 1784 and originally existed only up until 1786. It was reestablished in 1876. During the Croatian War of Independence the village of Slakovci was included within the self-proclaimed SAO Eastern Slavonia, Baranja and Western Syrmia with most of the local Croat Catholic population being expelled. The Church of Saint Anne was intentionally devastated by Serb forces. After the end of the United Nations Transitional Administration for Eastern Slavonia, Baranja and Western Sirmium in 1998 the Church of Saint Anne was the first church in the region which was reconstructed already in 2000.

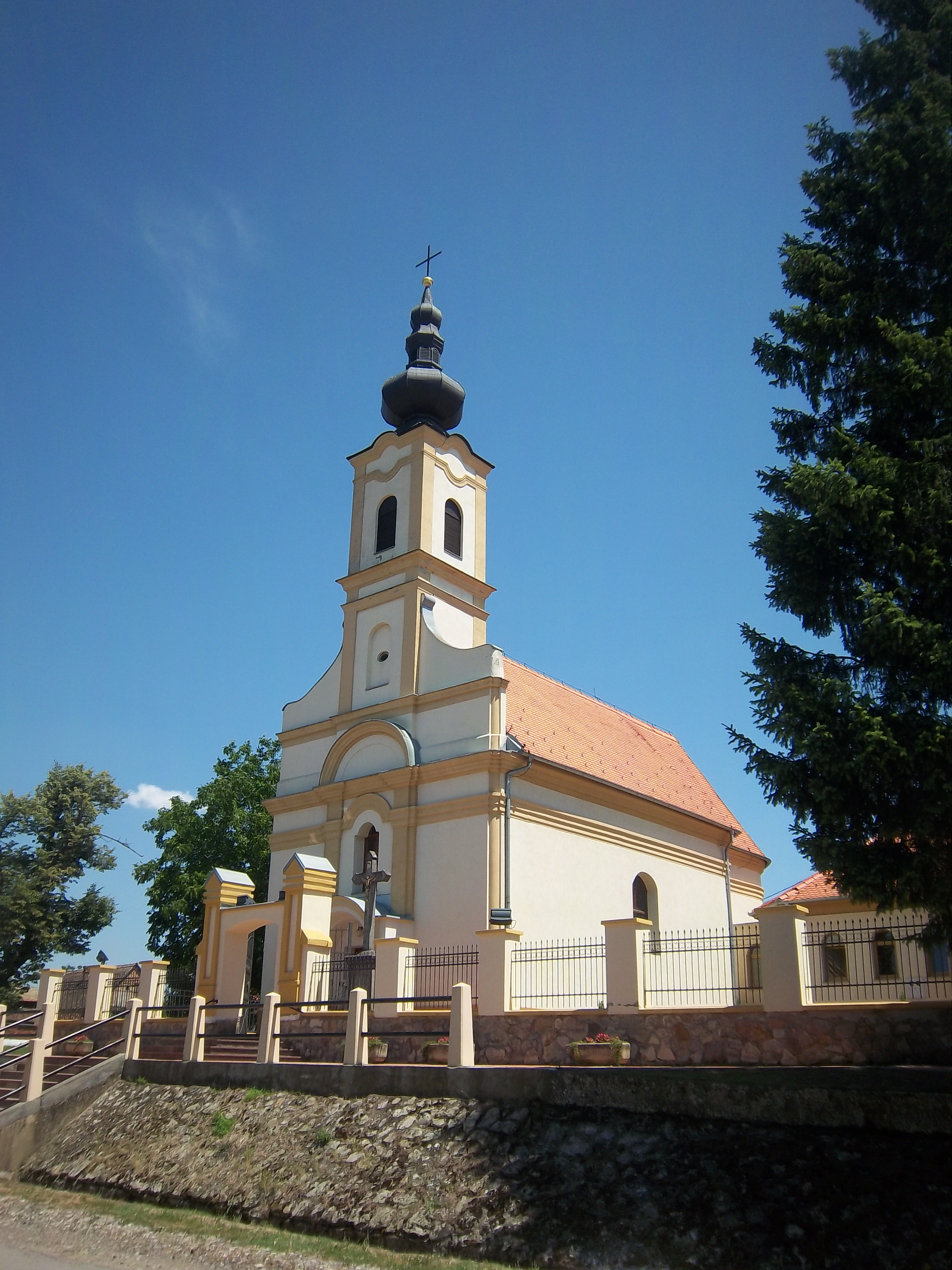
Church of Saint Anne

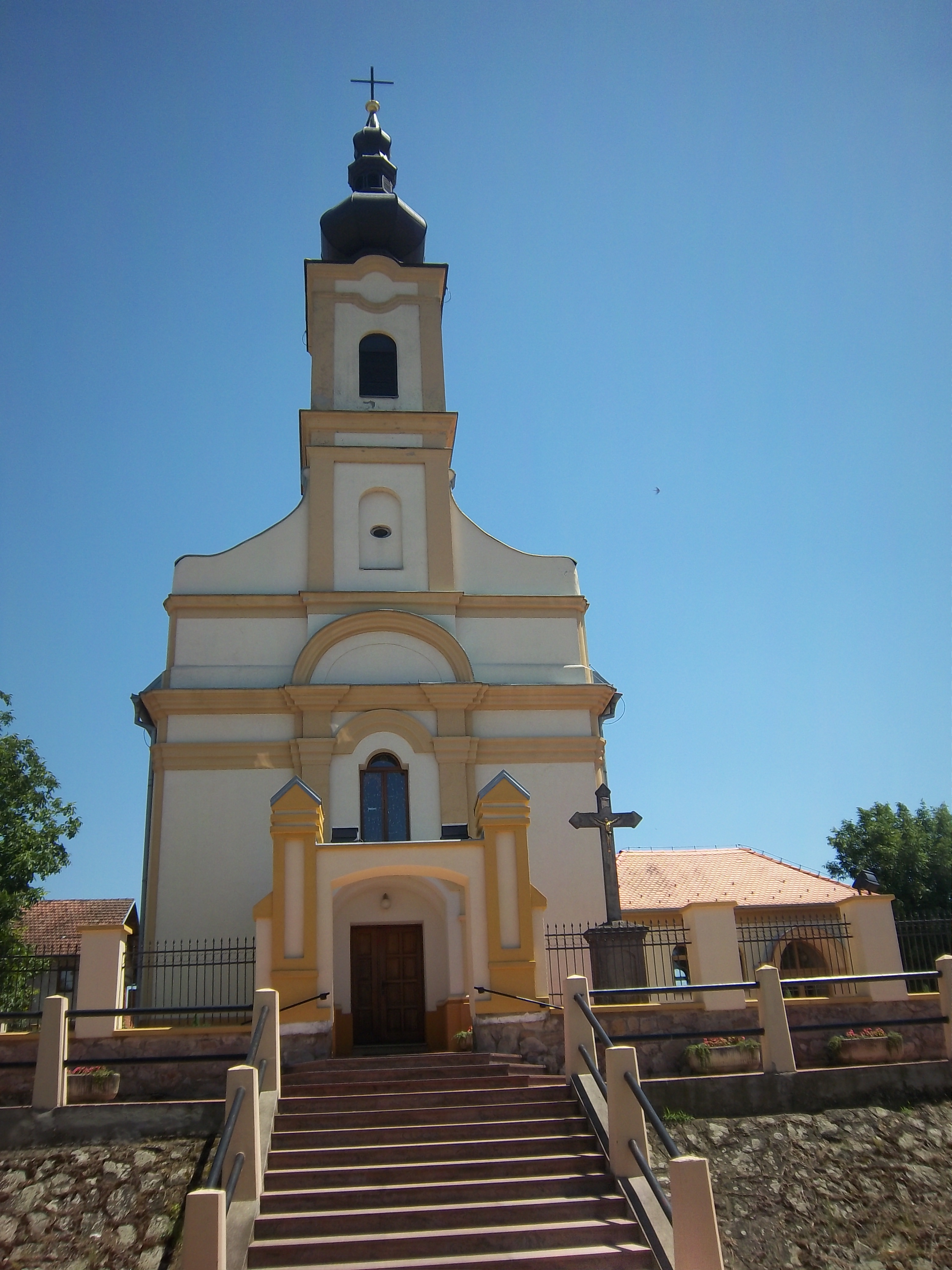
Church of Saint Anne
