= Church of St. Elijah, Novi Jankovci =

Serbian Orthodox church in Novi Jankovci, Croatia

Church of St. Elijah
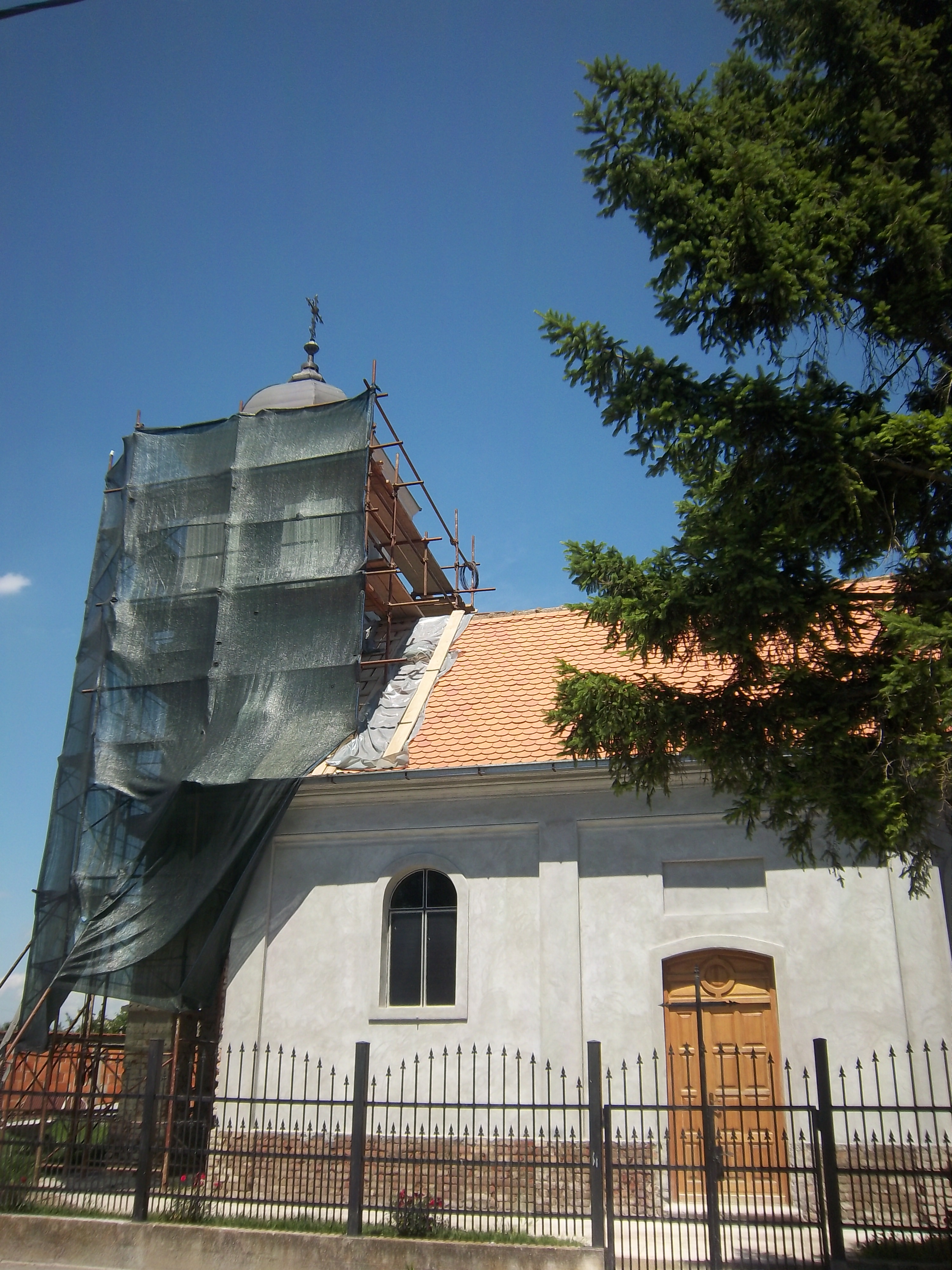
- Church of St. Elijah
- Location: Novi Jankovci, Vukovar-Syrmia County
- Country: Croatia
- Denomination: Serbian Orthodox

History
- Status: Church
- Dedication: Elijah

Architecture
- Functional status: Active
- Years built: 1897

Administration
- Archdiocese: Eparchy of Osijek Plain and Baranya

Church of St. Elijah (Croatian: Crkva svetog Ilije, Serbian: Црква светог Илије) in Novi Jankovci is Serbian Orthodox church in eastern Croatia. The church was constructed in 1897 during the time of Austro-Hungarian Kingdom of Croatia-Slavonia.

It is a church of smaller dimensions compared to majority of other Orthodox churches in the region. It was devastated in 1942 during the existence of quisling Independent State of Croatia and once again in 1991 during the Croatian War of Independence. It was reconstructed as early as 1996 in the period of the United Nations Transitional Administration for Eastern Slavonia, Baranja and Western Sirmium.

== See also ==
- List of Serbian Orthodox churches in Croatia
- Eparchy of Osijek Plain and Baranya
- Serbs of Croatia
