= Jankovci railway station =

Railway station in Stari Jankovci, Croatia

Coordinates: 45°14′42″N 18°54′12″E

Jankovci

General information
- Location: Croatia
- Tracks: 5
Location

Jankovci railway station (Croatian: Željeznički kolodvor Jankovci) is a railway station on Novska–Tovarnik railway. It is located between Novi Jankovci and Stari Jankovci. Jankovci railway station consists of 5 railway tracks.

Since 2012 railway reconstruction, the station has been used exclusively for freight, with passenger trains stopping at newly built Novi Jankovci halt.

== See also ==
- Croatian Railways
- Zagreb–Belgrade railway

Preceding station	Jankovci railway station	Following station
Mirkovci	M104 railway (Croatia); Novska to Tovarnik route	Sremske Laze
