= Slakovci =

- Village (Selo)
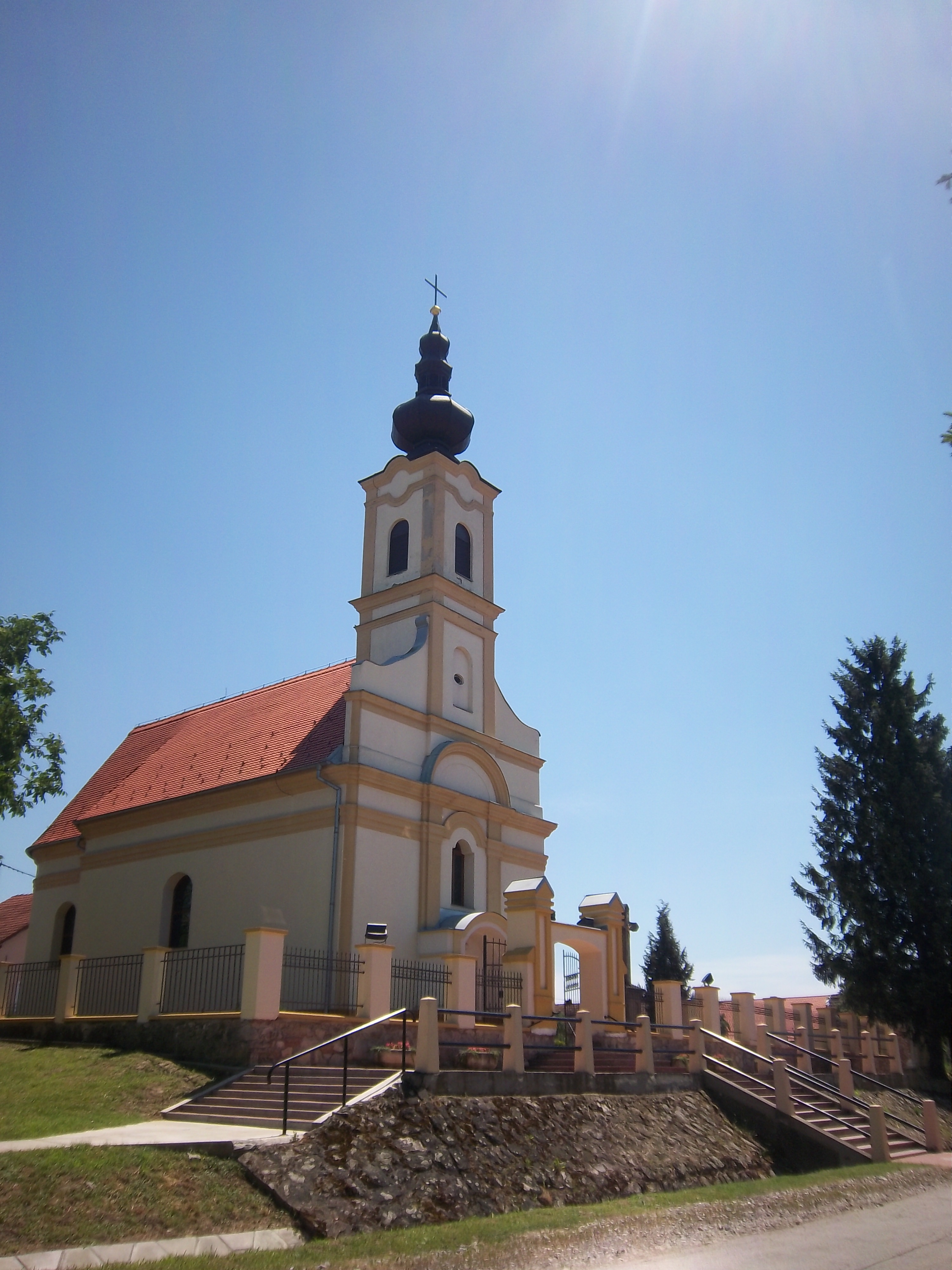

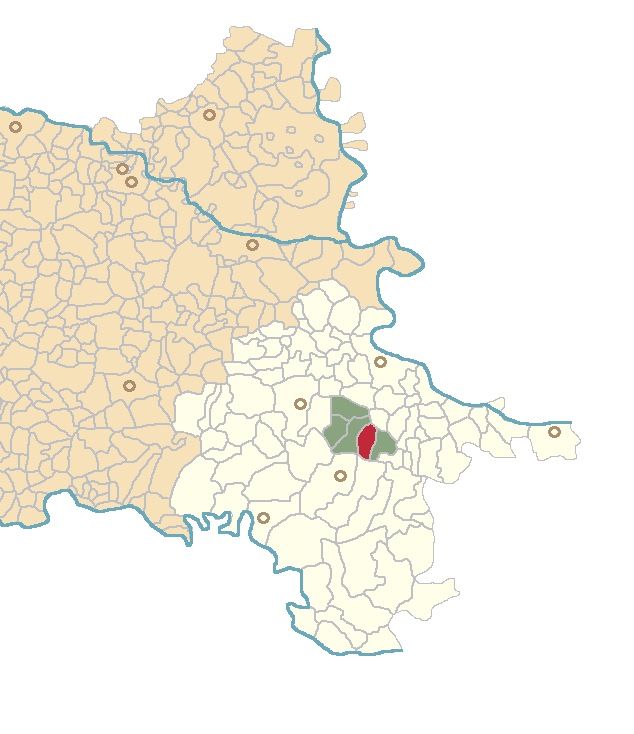

- Location within Vukovar-Syrmia County Location within Croatia Location within Europe
- Coordinates: 45°13′N 18°57′E
- Country: Croatia
- Region: Syrmia (Podunavlje)
- County: Vukovar-Syrmia
- Municipality: Stari Jankovci

Area
  - Total: 6.8 sq mi (17.6 km^{2})

Population (2021)
  - Total: 701
  - Density: 103/sq mi (39.8/km^{2})
- Demonym(s): Slakovčanin (♂) Slakovčanka (♀) (per grammatical gender)
- Time zone: UTC+1 (CET)
  - Summer (DST): UTC+2 (CEST)
- Vehicle registration: VK

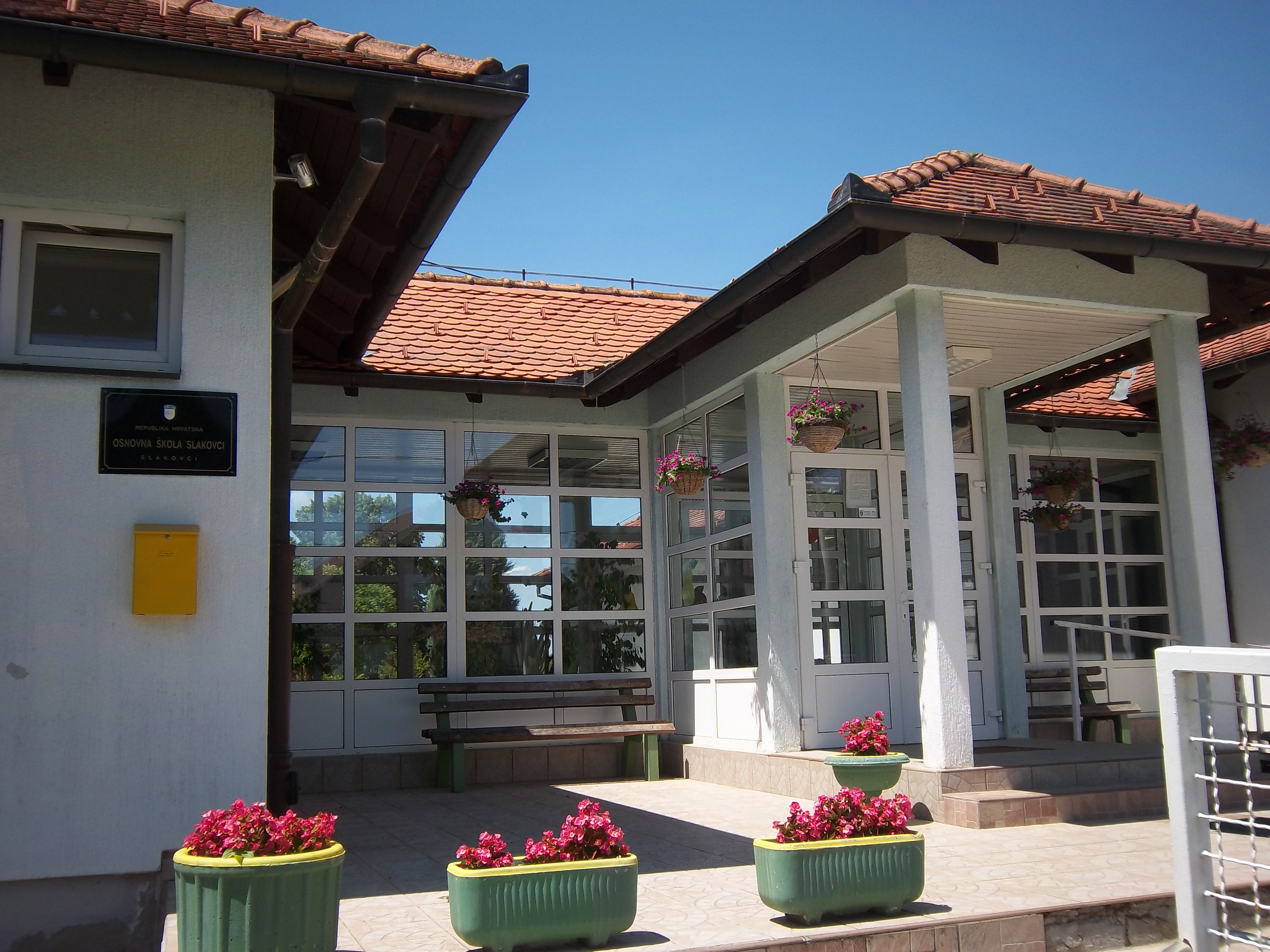

Slakovci (German: Zlaakowcz, Hungarian: Szlakóc) is a village in Stari Jankovci municipality of Vukovar-Syrmia County in eastern Croatia. It is connected by the D46 state road. The village is physically connected with the village of Srijemske Laze. The village is connected with the rest of the country by the D46 state road connecting it with the town of Vinkovci and continuing into Serbia as the State Road 120 to the nearest town of Šid.

== Name ==
The name of the village in Croatian is plural.

== History ==
Slakovci were first mentioned in 1491. They got their name from the weed "slak" or the Hungarian word "slavok" which means Slavs. The feudal family of Gorjanski built a fort in Slavkovci for defense against the Turks. The Turks ruled the Slakovci from 1526 to 1691, and after that the Slakovci belonged to the military territory. Following Ottoman retreat from the region, the Lordship of Vukovar was established, and the village became part of its domain in 1716 until 1737 when it was transferred back to Slavonian Military Frontier.

In July 1943, during the World War II in Yugoslavia, Nazi forces destroyed agricultural machinery, including threshers, across several villages, including Slakovci.

== Population ==
Village population
Year	Residents
2001	1,203
2011	958
2021	701

== See also ==
- Slakovci railway station
- Church of Saint Anne, Slakovci
