= Church of Saints Philip and James, Vukovar =

Parish Church of Saints Philip and James
- Župna crkva svetih Filipa i Jakova
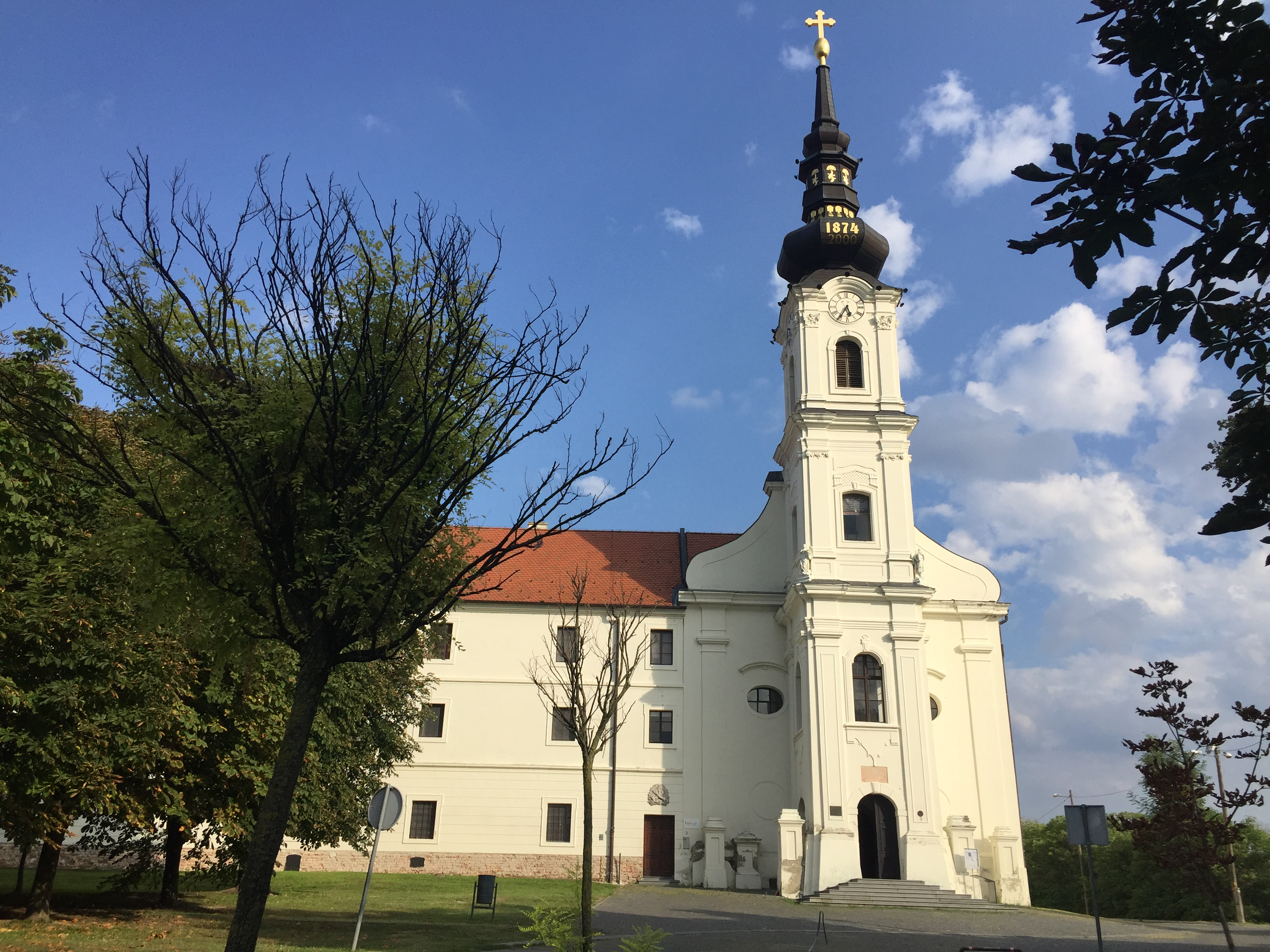
- Parish Church of Saints Philip and James
- 45°20′50″N 19°00′26″E
- Location: Vukovar
- Country: Croatia
- Denomination: Roman Catholic
- Website: filipjakov-vu.com

History
- Status: Parish church
- Dedication: Saint Philip and Saint James
- Dedicated: 1738

Architecture
- Functional status: Active
- Style: Baroque
- Groundbreaking: 1723
- Completed: 1732

Specifications
- Length: 60 m (197 ft)

Administration
- Metropolis: Metropolis of Đakovo-Osijek
- Archdiocese: Archdiocese of Đakovo-Osijek
- Deanery: Vukovar Deanery
- Parish: Parish of Saints Philip and James - Vukovar

The Church of Saints Philip and James (Croatian: Crkva svetih Filipa i Jakova) is a Roman Catholic church in Vukovar, Croatia.

== History ==
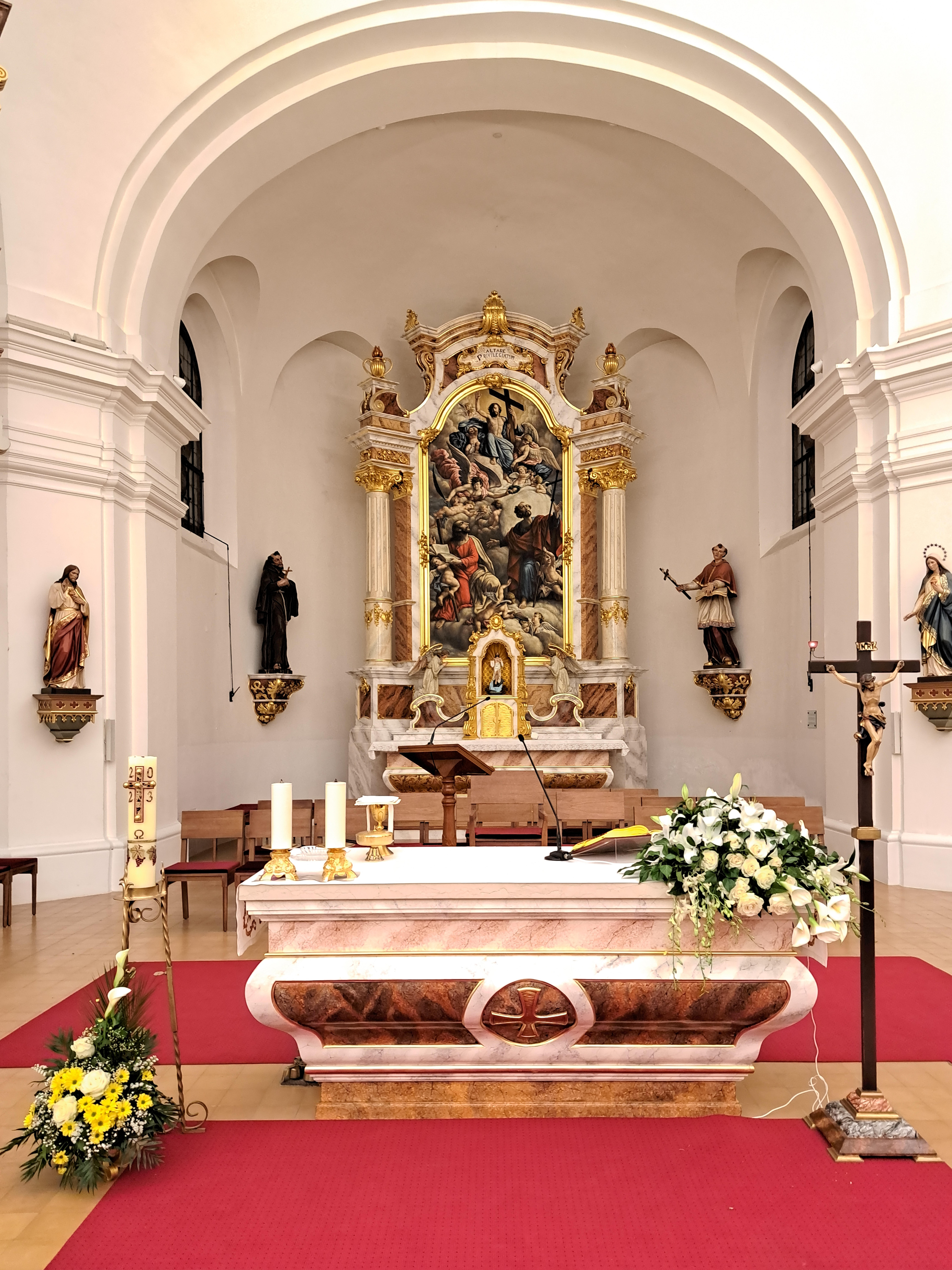
Church interior

The church was built from 1723 till 1732, when it was blessed by Marko Dragojević. It was built by Franciscan monks who moved to Vukovar from the village of Srijemske Laze.

In 1738 it was dedicated by Sigismund Berenyi.

In 1897 it was expanded according to the plans of Franz Langerberg and later Richard Jordan.

On 24 May 1899 the renovated and expanded church was dedicated by Anđelko Voršak.

In 1911 it was successfully painted with fresco paintings.

In 1924 were procured 3 new bells. One of that bells was given by last Vukovar countess, Sofija Eltz.

In 1991, during the battle of Vukovar, in the Croatian War of Independence, the church was extensively damaged.

In 1995, during the Serbian occupation of city, body of Saint Bono was burned.

After reintegration of Vukovar, in 2000 on church and monastery was installed a new roof. The church also got 3 new bells.
