= Novi Jankovci =

Coordinates: 45°14′N 18°54′E

- Village (Selo)
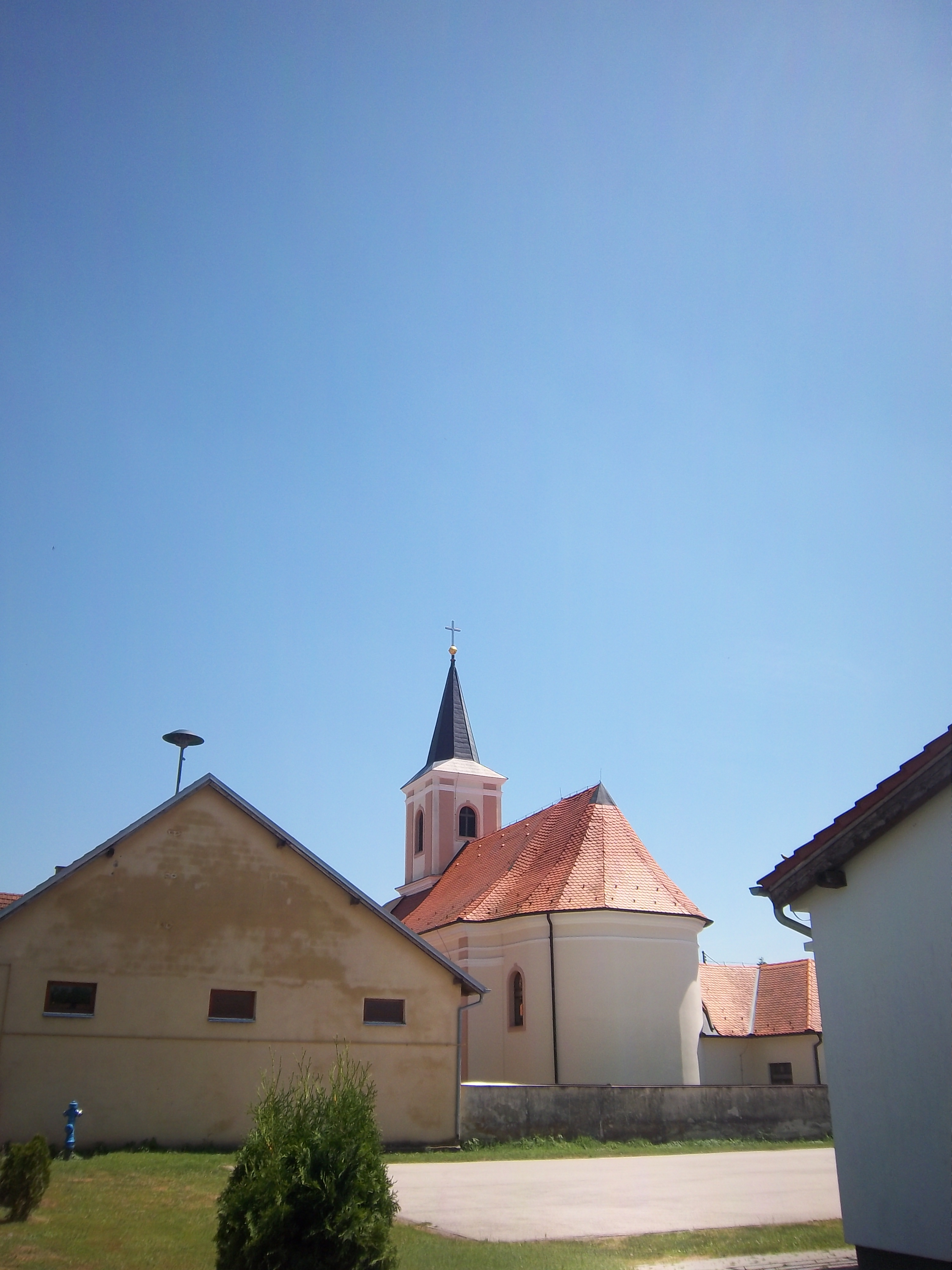

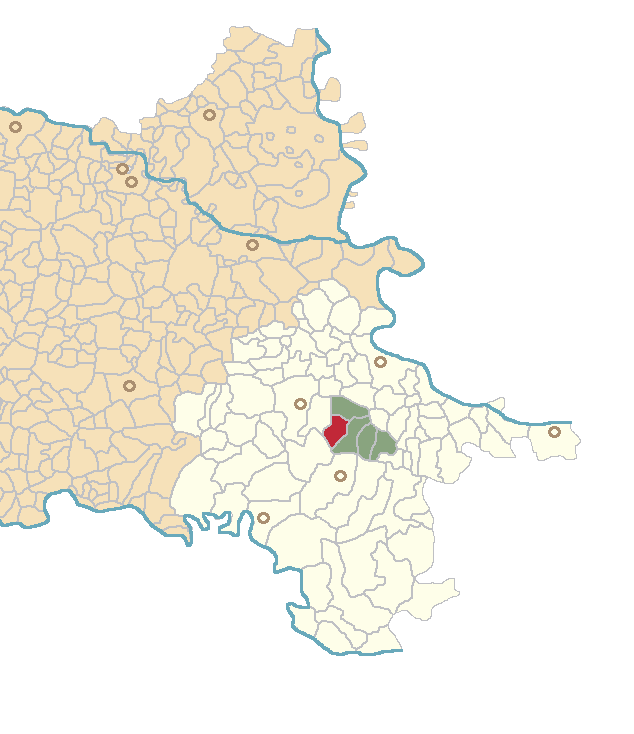
- Country: Croatia
- Region: Syrmia (Podunavlje)
- County: Vukovar-Syrmia
- Municipality: Stari Jankovci

Area
  - Total: 18.8 km^{2} (7.3 sq mi)

Population (2021)
  - Total: 693
  - Density: 36.9/km^{2} (95.5/sq mi)
- Demonym(s): Jankovčanin (♂) Jankovčanka (♀) (per grammatical gender)
- Time zone: UTC+1 (CET)
  - Summer (DST): UTC+2 (CEST)
- Vehicle registration: VK

Novi Jankovci (Serbian Cyrillic: Нови Јанковци, Hungarian: Újjankovce) is a village in the Stari Jankovci Municipality in eastern Croatia.

== Name ==
The name of the village in Croatian is plural.

== History ==
Novi Jankovci was most likely created in 1745, when Queen Marija Terezija decided that part of the land from Jankovci should be annexed to the Military Territory. A village was founded on the new land, where more than 30 Croatian and 8 Serbian families settled.

== See also ==
- Jankovci railway station
- Church of St. Elijah, Novi Jankovci
