= Church of the Nativity of the Theotokos, Srijemske Laze =

Serbian Orthodox church in Srijemske Laze, Croatia

Church of the Nativity of the Theotokos
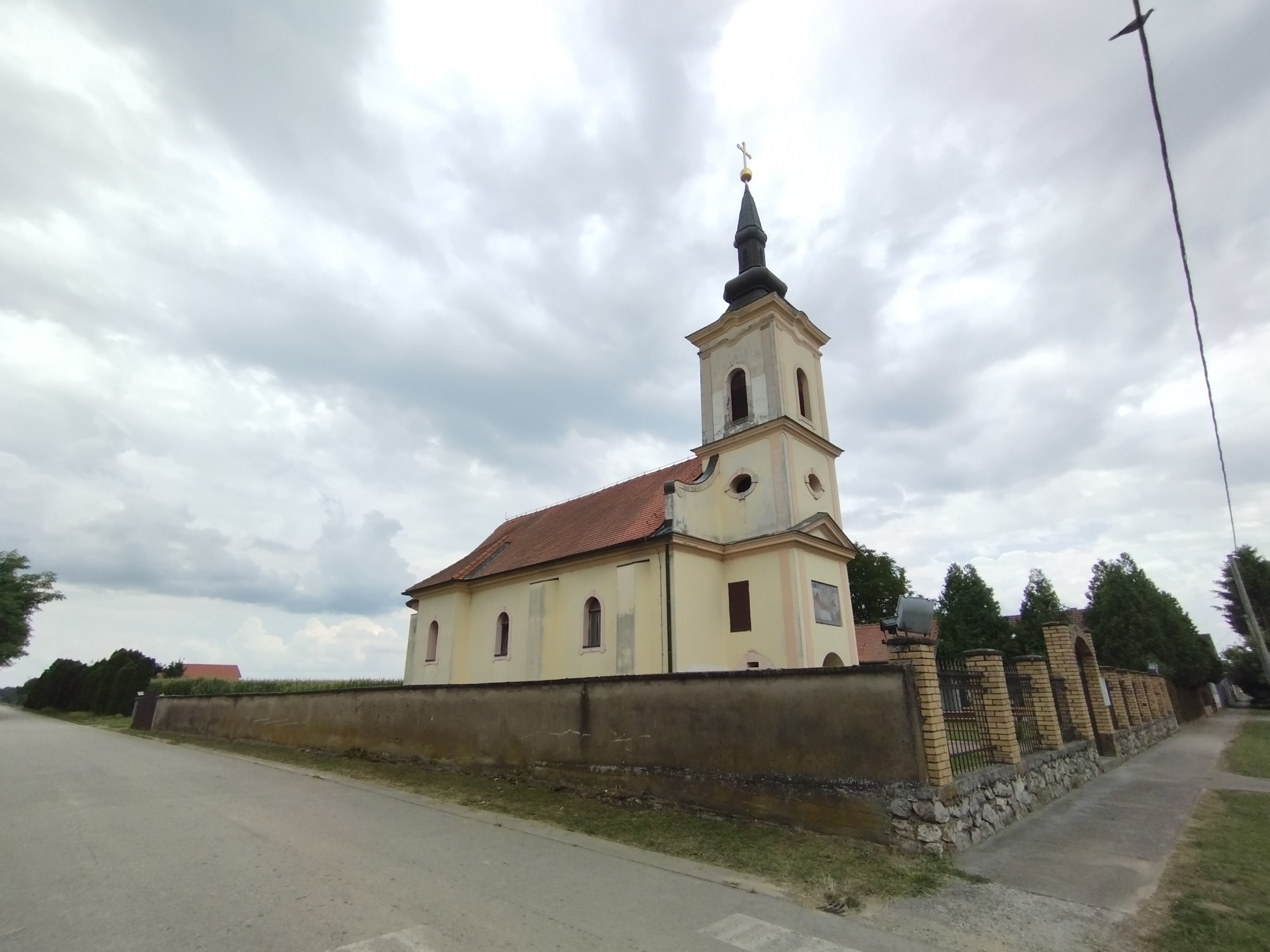
- Church of the Nativity of the Theotokos
- Church of the Nativity of the Theotokos
- 45°13′50″N 18°55′55″E
- Location: Branislav Nušić Street 1; 32 242 Srijemske Laze; Vukovar-Syrmia County
- Country: Croatia
- Denomination: Serbian Orthodox

History
- Dedication: Nativity of Mary

Architecture
- Style: Baroque and Classicism

Administration
- Archdiocese: Eparchy of Osijek Plain and Baranya

Church of the Nativity of the Theotokos in Srijemske Laze is a Serbian Orthodox church in Vukovar-Syrmia County in eastern Croatia. Church is dedicated to Nativity of the Theotokos and was built in 1793. The building is listed in Register of Cultural Goods of Croatia. During the history building was renewed three times, in 1792, 1925 and 2003. Iconostasis with 21 icon was built in 1926. During World War II and Independent State of Croatia church movable property was taken away, and church was converted into Roman Catholic one.

== See also ==
- List of Serbian Orthodox churches in Croatia
- Eparchy of Osijek Plain and Baranya
- Serbs of Croatia
