= D46 road (Croatia) =

Road in Croatia

D46 state road

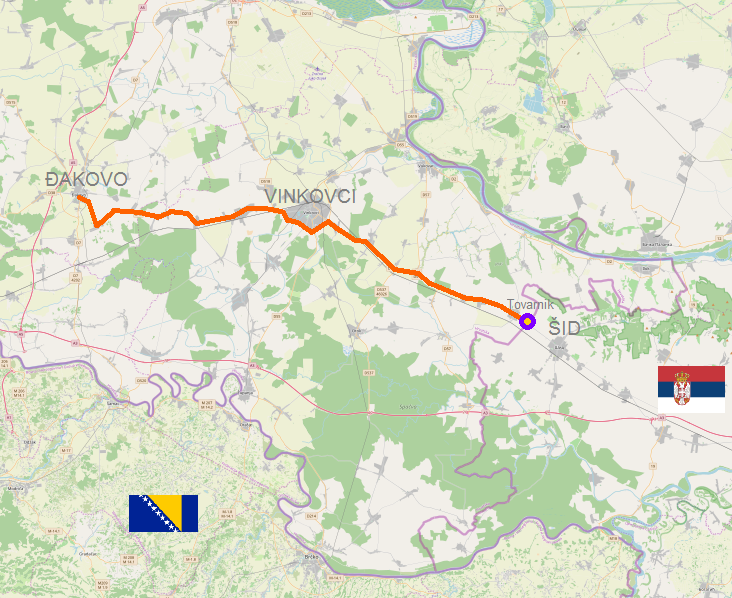

Route information
- Length: 73.0 km (45.4 mi)

Major junctions
- From: D7 in Đakovo
- D518 near Vinkovci; D55 in Vinkovci; D57 in Orolik
- To: Tovarnik border crossing to Serbia; Serbian route 120

Location
- Country: Croatia
- Counties: Vukovar-Srijem, Osijek-Baranja
- Major cities: Đakovo, Vinkovci

Highway system
- Highways in Croatia

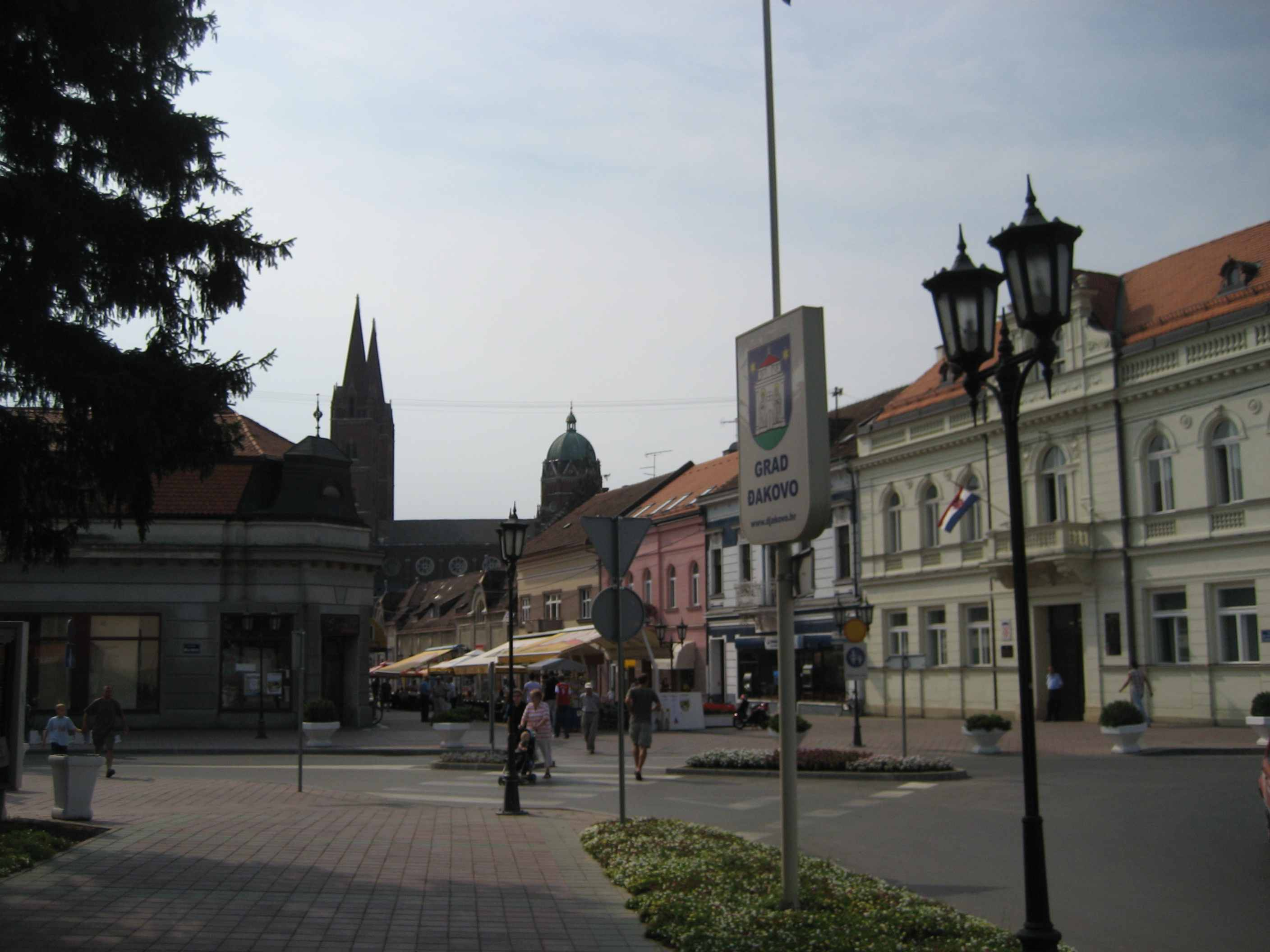
Đakovo, on the western terminus of the D46 road

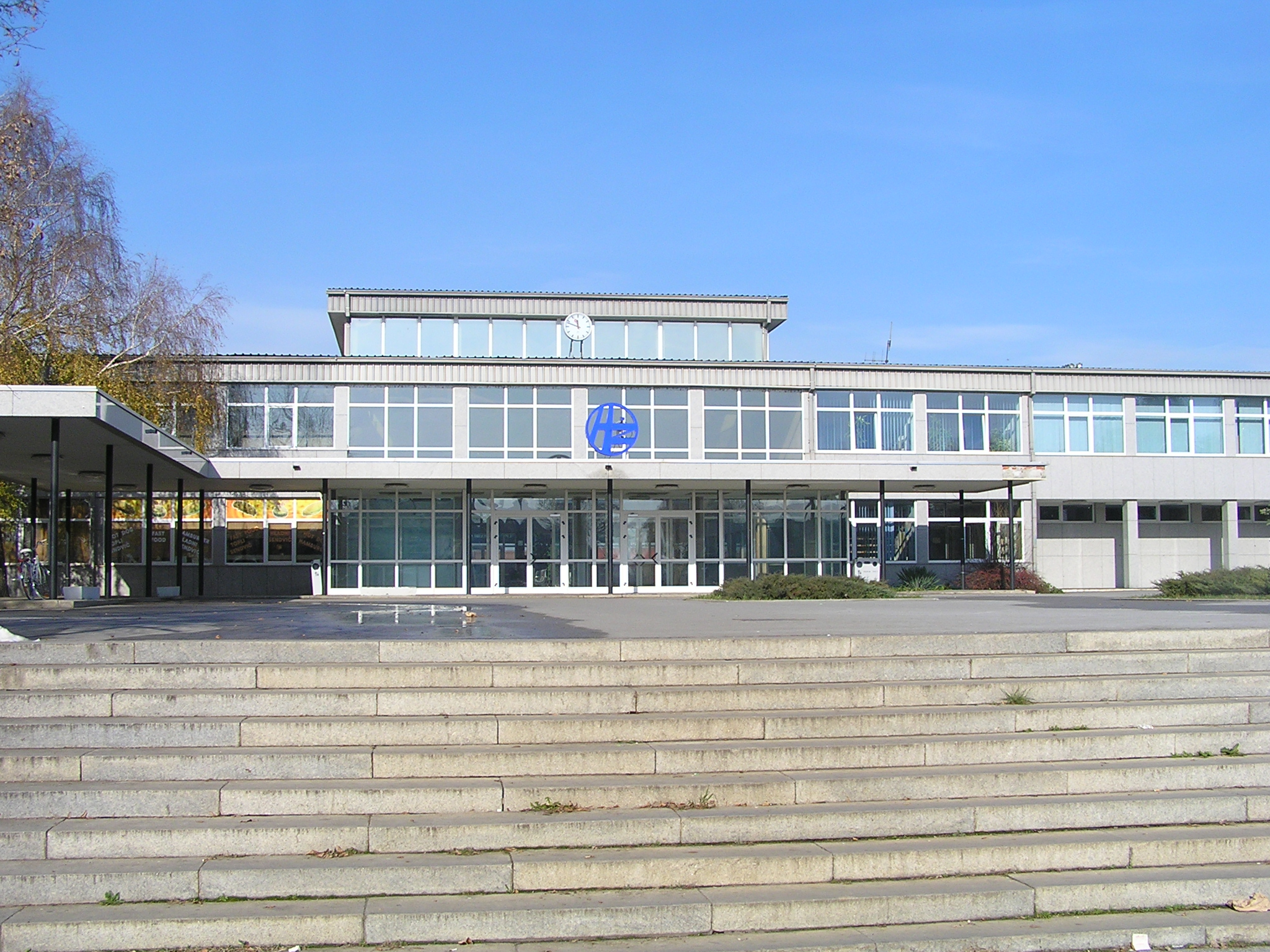
Vinkovci, next to the D46 road route

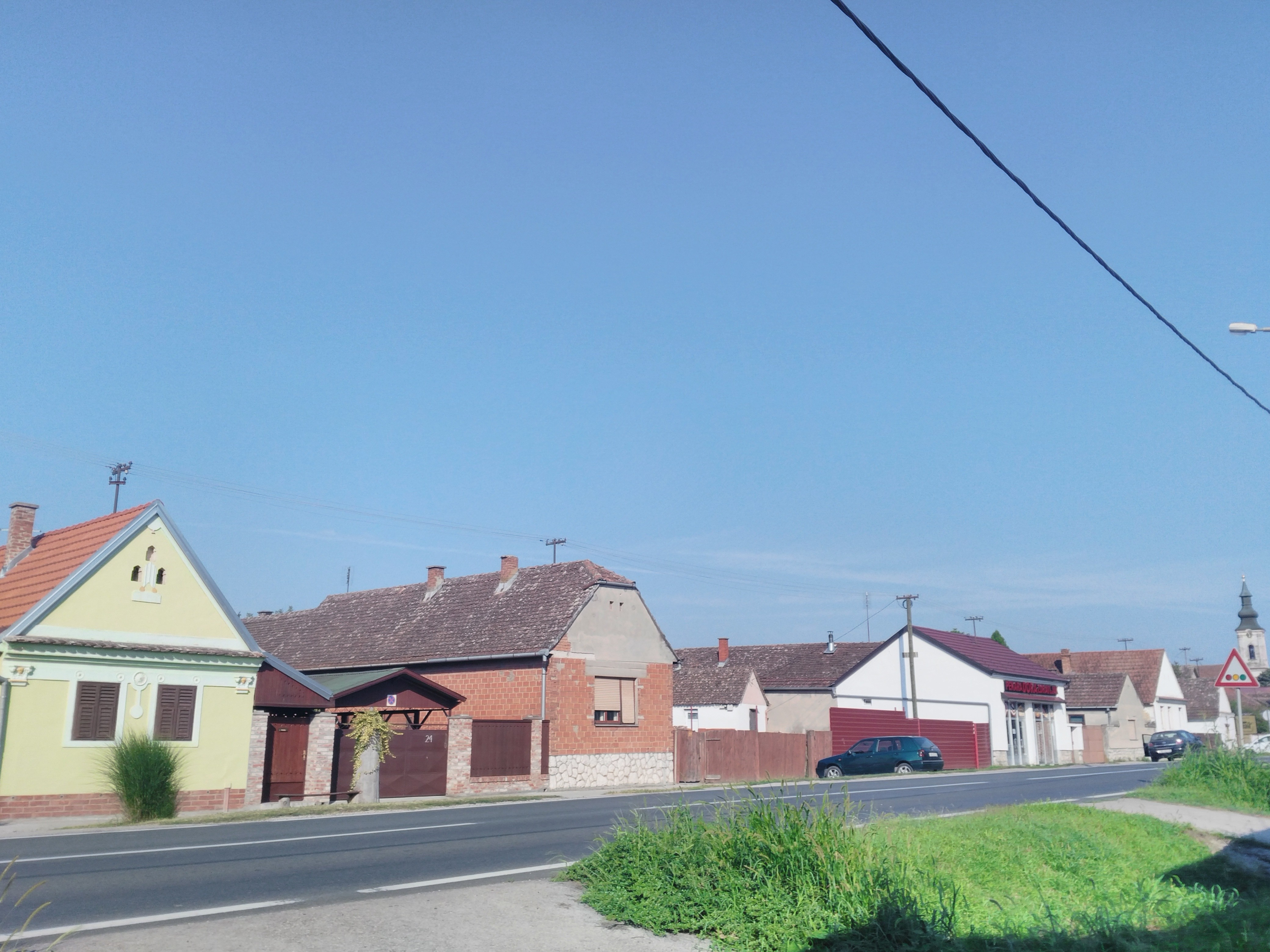
D46 road in Mirkovci

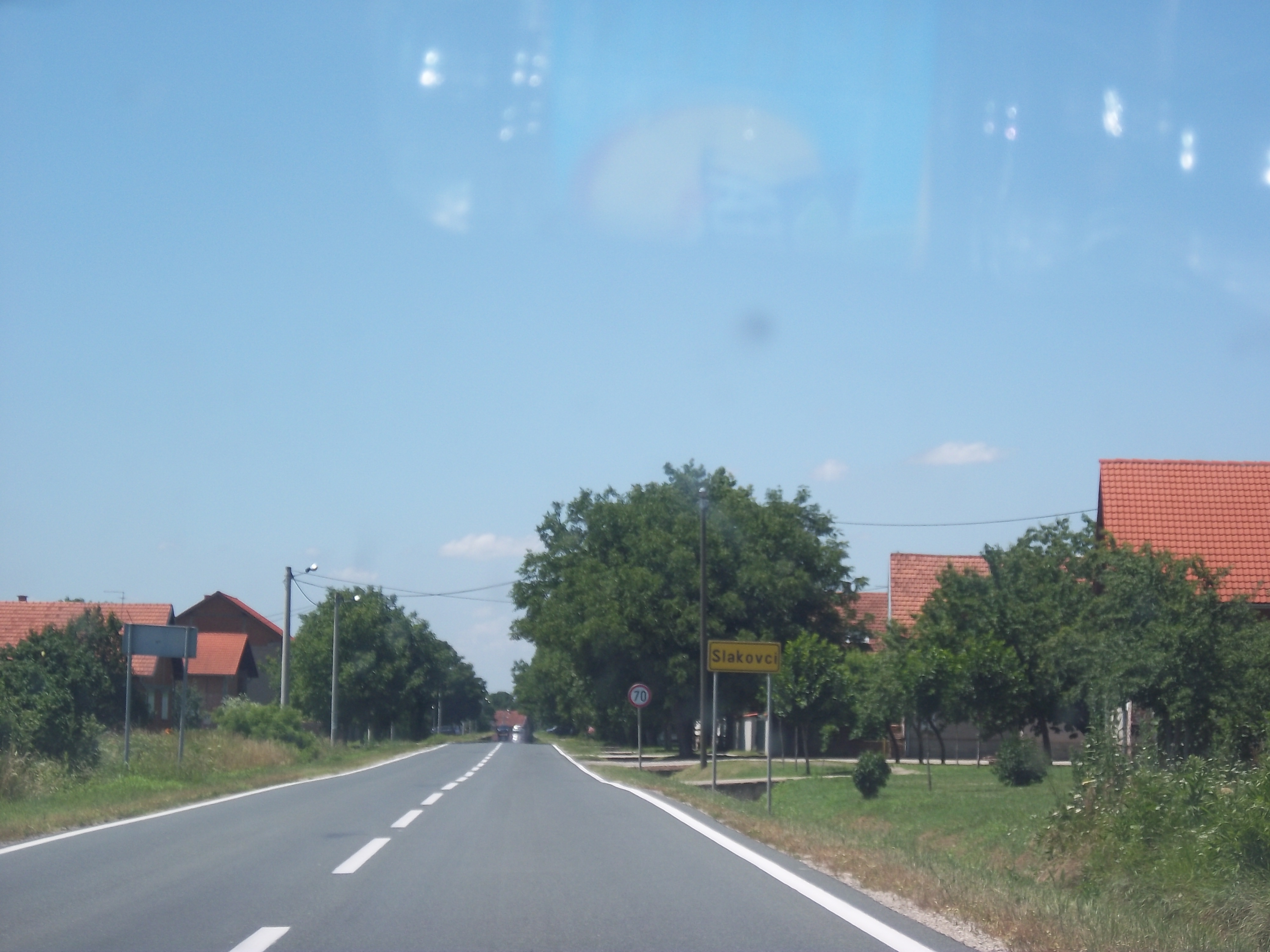
D46 road in Slakovci

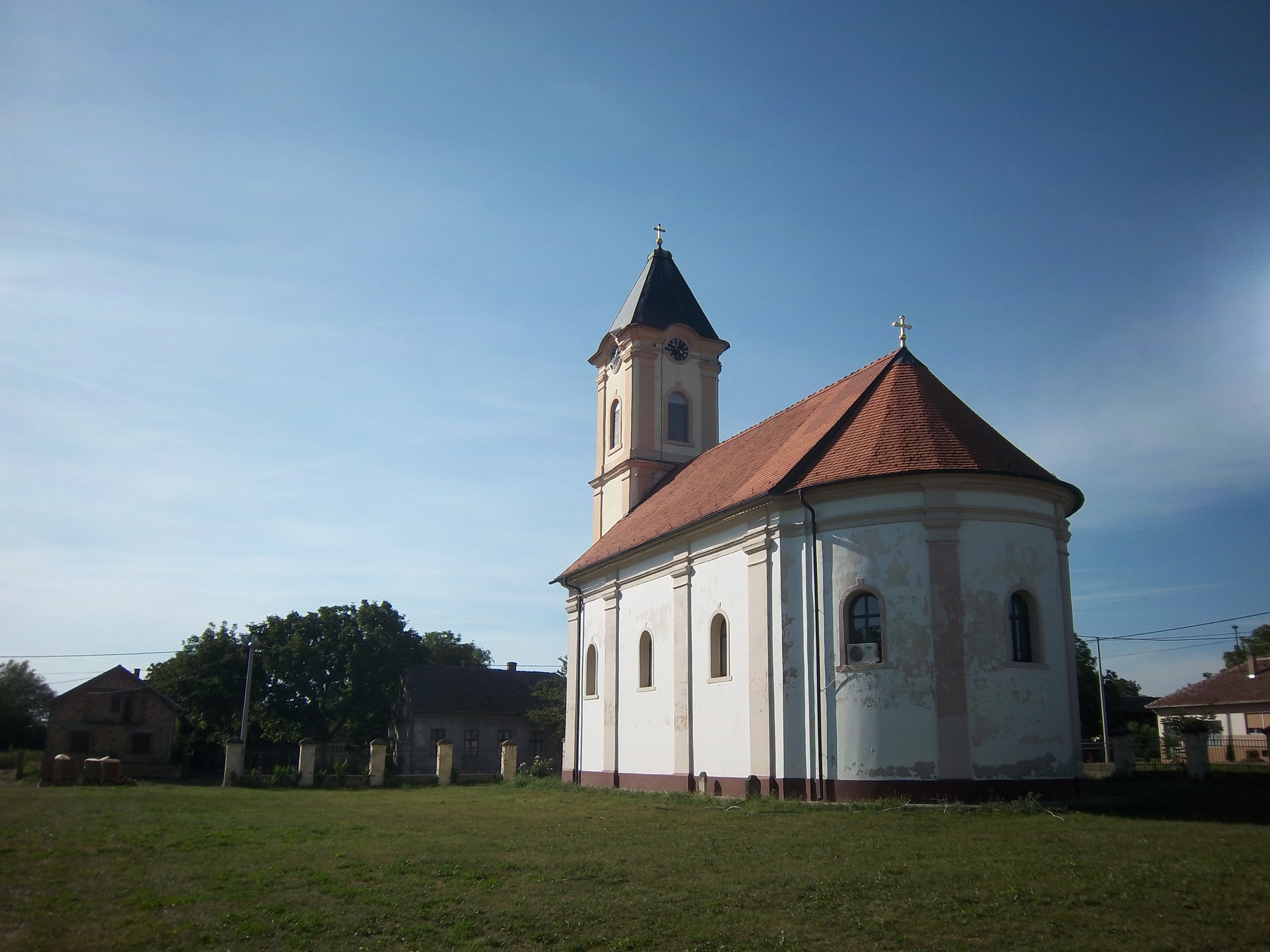
St. Petka's Church in Banovci

The D46 state road in the eastern part of Croatia connects the cities and towns of Đakovo and Vinkovci to the state road network of Croatia, and to the border with Serbia. The road is 73.0 km (45.4 mi) long. The route comprises some urban intersections, mostly in the cities Đakovo and Vinkovci, though it bypasses most of the latter city and is planned to bypass it completely.

The D46 state road starts in the Osijek-Baranja County in the region of Slavonia, enters the Vukovar-Syrmia County and intersects it orthogonally to the D55 state road, ending in the region of Syrmia. Following the Tovarnik border crossing it continues in Serbia as the State Road 120.

As with all other state roads in Croatia, the D46 is managed and maintained by Hrvatske ceste, state-owned company.

== Traffic volume ==
Traffic is regularly counted and reported by Hrvatske ceste, operator of the road.

D46 traffic volume
Road	Counting site	AADT	ASDT	Notes
D46	3708 Stari Mikanovci	3,287	3,491	Between the Ž4133 and Ž4166 junctions.
D46	3709 Vođinci	3,255	3,532	Between the Ž4166 and Ž4167 junctions.
D46	3722 Vinkovci bypass	1,998	2,061	Between the D518 and D55 junctions.
D46	3711 Srijemske Laze	3,390	3,736	Adjacent to the Ž4150 junction.
D46	3712 Orolik	2,346	2,701	Adjacent to the D57 junction.
D46	3804 Ilača - west	1,375	1,741	Adjacent to the Ž4197 junction.
D46	3810 Tovarnik	1,166	1,374	Between the Ž4150 junction and the border crossing.

According to data from the Border Police in Tovarnik, the number of trucks entering Croatia at the border crossing with Serbia was 190,764 in 2020; 272,967 in 2021; 302,218 in 2022; 290,475 in 2023; and 290,048 in 2024. This amounts to an average of approximately 800 trucks per day. Residents and local officials report cracked walls, destroyed curbs, respiratory issues, and serious traffic hazards near schools and playgrounds, with several near-fatal incidents. The Croatian Ministry of the Interior has deployed additional traffic control measures at the section with over 235 violations by truck drivers recorded in the Tovarnik area alone in 2024.

=== 2019 truck traffic volume demonstrations ===
In early 2019 villages of Tovarnik, Ilača and Banovci organized joint demonstrations against truck drivers from countries other than Croatia and Serbia which are causing heavy traffic congestion on the D46 road while waiting to cross the state border between Croatia and Serbia. Citizens requested redirection of all truck transportation, with the exception of Croatian and Serbian trucks traveling to one or the other state, to be removed from the D46 road and redirected to A3 motorway.

== Road junctions and populated areas ==
D46 junctions/populated areas
Type	Slip roads/Notes
	Đakovo; D7 to Osijek (to the north) and to Slavonski Šamac (to the south). Ž4146 connection to D7; The western terminus of the road.
	Budrovci
	Đurđanci
	Stari Mikanovci; Ž4133 to Vrbica, Kešinci. Ž4202 to Strizivojna, Bartolovci (D525).
	Novi Mikanovci
	Vođinci; Ž4166 to Retkovci and Andrijaševci.
	Ivankovo; Ž4167 to Retkovci, Prkovci, Šiškovci, Cerna.
	D518 to Jarmina and Osijek (D2).
	To Vinkovci via Alojzija Stepinca Street. Vinkovci bypass.
	To Vinkovci via Hansa Dietricha Genschera Street. Vinkovci bypass.
	D55 to Županja and the A3 motorway Županja interchange (to the south). The D46 and D55 state roads are concurrent to the north. End of the Vinkovci bypass, as of 2014.
	Vinkovci; D55 to Vukovar (D2) (to the north). The D46 and D55 state roads are concurrent to the south.
	Mirkovci
	Ž4150 to Stari Jankovci, Petrovci and Vukovar. Ž4194 to Novi Jankovci.
	Srijemske Laze
	Slakovci
	Orolik; D57 to Negoslavci and Vukovar. The D46 and D57 state roads are concurrent to the east.
	D57 to Nijemci and A3 motorway Lipovac interchange. The D46 and D57 state roads are concurrent to the west.
	Banovci; Ž4197 to Čakovci.
	Ilača
	Tovarnik; Ž4173 to Sotin; Ž4233 to Nijemci (D57).
	Tovarnik border crossing. The eastern terminus of the road. Serbian route 120 to Šid.
