= D57 =

D57 may refer to:

- D57 (Croatia), a state road in Croatia
- New South Wales D57 class locomotive, a class of locomotive operated by the New South Wales Government Railways, Australia
- HMS Fidelity (D57)
