= Novi Mikanovci =

Coordinates: 45°17′N 18°35′E

- Village
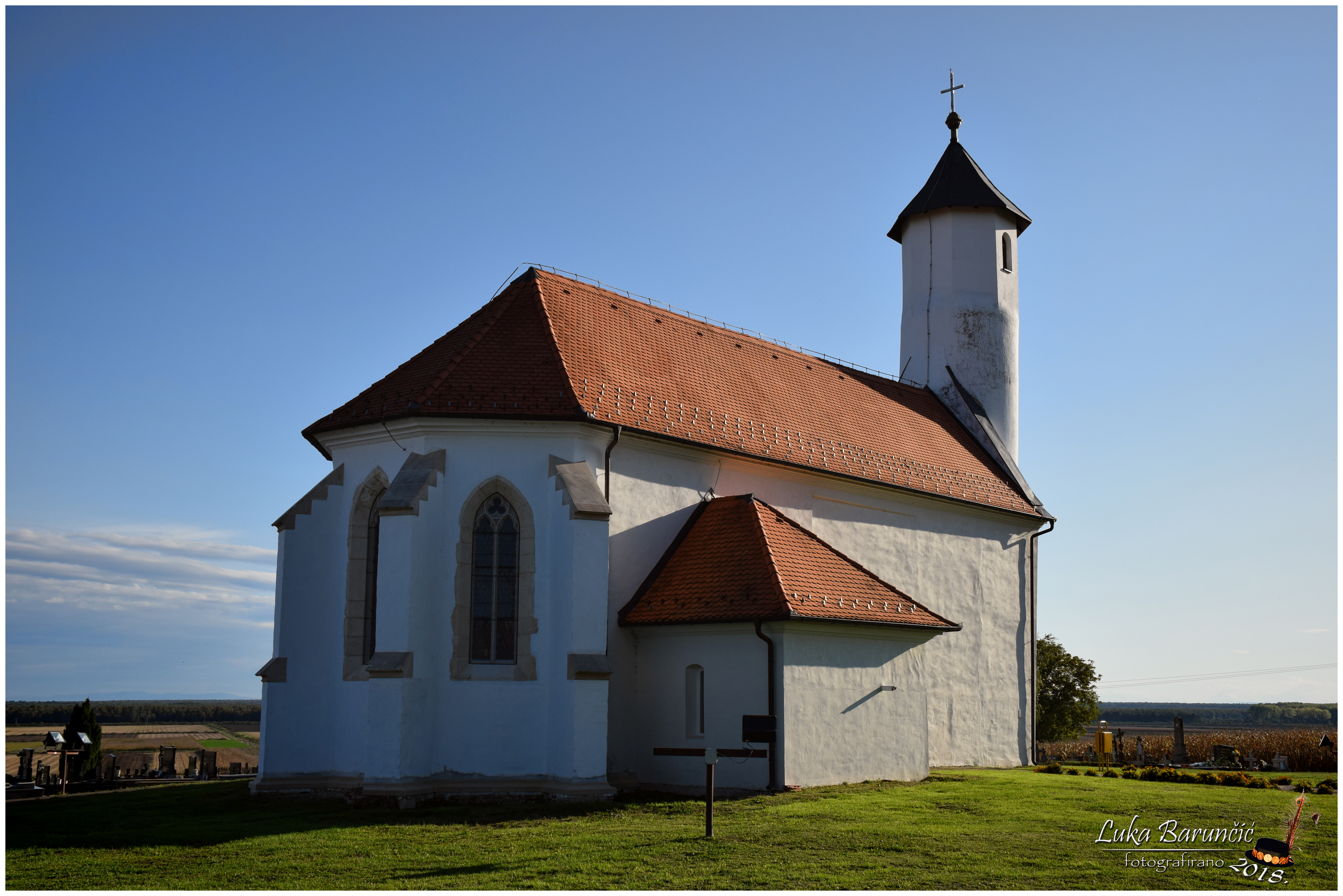

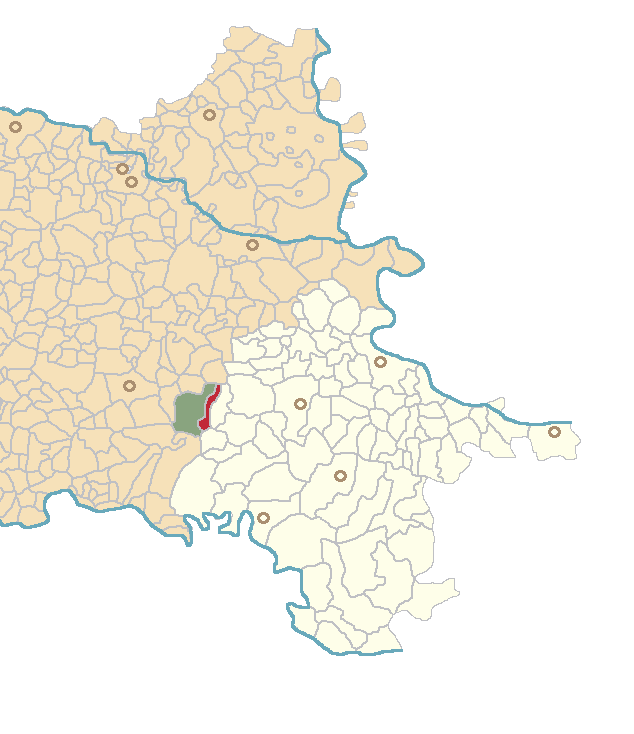
- Country: Croatia
- County: Vukovar-Syrmia
- Municipality: Stari Mikanovci

Area
  - Total: 3.9 sq mi (10.2 km^{2})

Population (2021)
  - Total: 536
  - Density: 136/sq mi (52.5/km^{2})
- Time zone: UTC+1 (CET)
  - Summer (DST): UTC+2 (CEST)
- Vehicle registration: VK

Novi Mikanovci is a village in Croatia. It is connected by the D46 highway.

== Name ==
The name of the village in Croatian is plural.
