= Ivankovo railway station =

Railway station in Croatia

Coordinates: 45°16′43″N 18°40′2″E

Ivankovo

General information
- Location: Croatia
- Tracks: 5
Location

Ivankovo railway station (Croatian: Željeznički kolodvor Ivankovo) is a railway station on Novska–Tovarnik railway. Located in Ivankovo. Railroad continues to Stari Mikanovci in one, and to Vinkovci in the other direction. Ivankovo railway station consists of 5 railway tracks.

== See also ==
- Croatian Railways
- Zagreb–Belgrade railway
