= Church of Sts. Peter and Paul, Orolik =

Serbian Orthodox church in Orolik, Croatia

Church of Sts. Peter and Paul
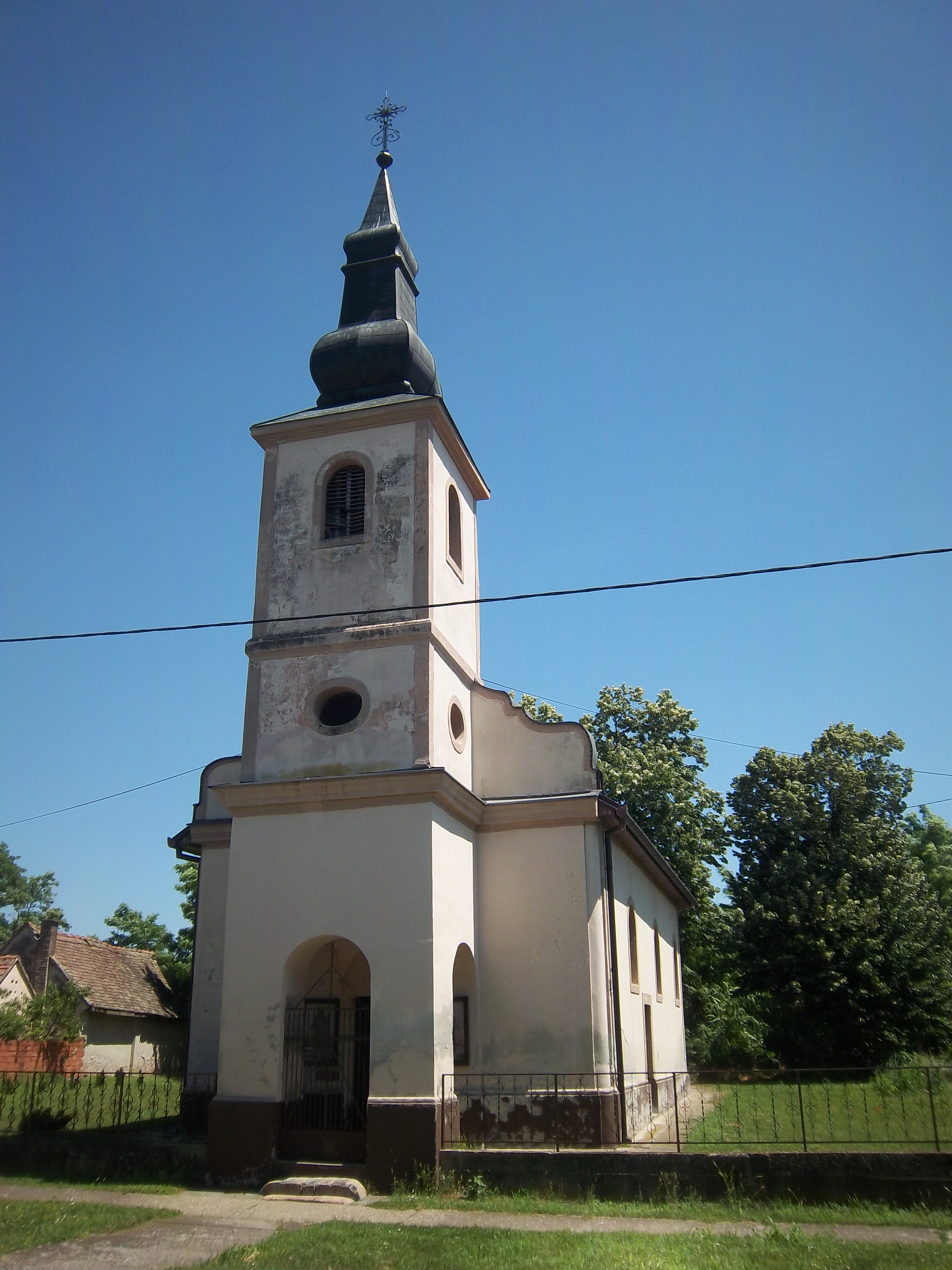
- Church of St. Peter and Paul
- Church of Sts. Peter and Paul
- 45°13′07″N 18°59′11″E
- Location: Orolik
- Country: Croatia
- Denomination: Serbian Orthodox

History
- Dedication: Saint Peter and Saint Paul
- Consecrated: 1748

Architecture
- Style: Baroque and Classicism

Administration
- Archdiocese: Eparchy of Osijek Plain and Baranya

Church of Sts. Peter and Paul (Croatian: Crkva svetih Petra i Pavla, Црква светих Петра и Павла) in Orolik is a Serbian Orthodox church in eastern Croatia. The church is dedicated to Saint Peter and Saint Paul. The church was constructed in 1748. It is the oldest religious building in the village. Alongside Eastern Orthodox, there is a Roman Catholic church in the village which was constructed in 1877. The Orthodox church building is listed in the Register of Cultural Goods of Croatia. The church celebrates its annual Slava on 12 of July (29 June by old Julian calendar).

== History of the Eastern Orthodox community in Orolik ==
In 1732 the Court Chamber (German: Hofkammer) of the Habsburg Empire decided to increase the total population of Orolik (which in 1715 had 19 Roman Catholich households) by settling 12 Eastern Orthodox families from the Lika, Otočac and Ogulin Regiments of the Karlovac General Command of the Croatian Military Frontier. In 1766 there was 38 Eastern Orthodox households and in 1791 there was 51 households with 329 inhabitants. In 1791 local Orthodox parish took over responsibilities for Eastern Orthodox community in Berak (8 households) and Komletinci (2 households).

== See also ==
- List of Serbian Orthodox churches in Croatia
- Eparchy of Osijek Plain and Baranya
- Serbs of Croatia
