= Budrovci =

- Village (Selo)
- Location within Osijek-Baranja County Location within Croatia Location within Europe
- Country: Croatia
- County: Osijek-Baranja County

Area
  - Total: 31.1 km^{2} (12.0 sq mi)

Population (2021)
  - Total: 1,107
  - Density: 35.6/km^{2} (92.2/sq mi)
- Time zone: UTC+1 (CET)
  - Summer (DST): UTC+2 (CEST)

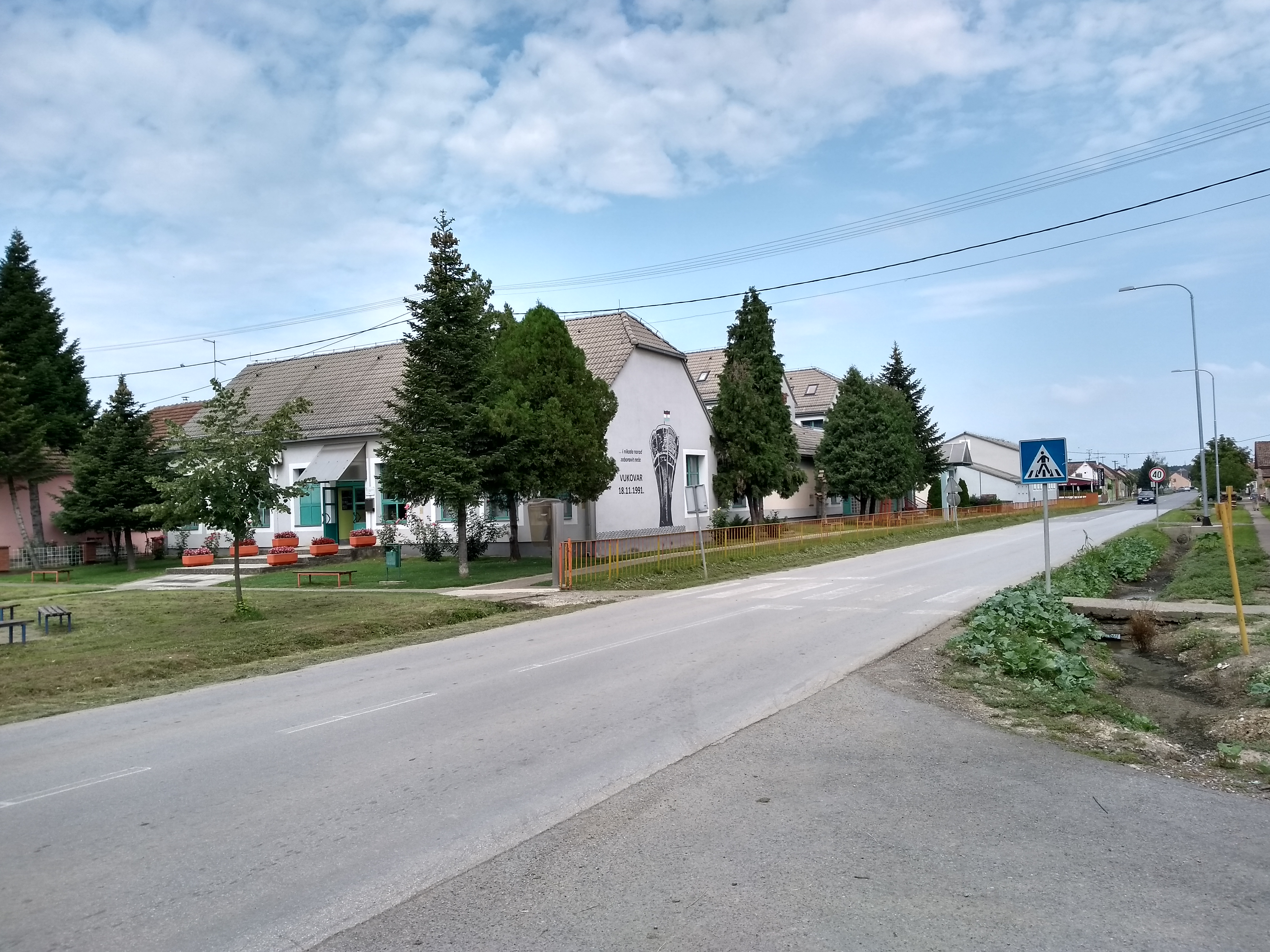
Village of Budrovci

Budrovci is a village in Croatia. It is connected by the D46 highway.
