= Zdravko Dizdar =

Croatian historian

- Born: 27 January 1948 (age 78); Oklaj, Yugoslavia
- Occupation: Historian
- Years active: 1980–present

Zdravko Dizdar (born 27 January 1948) is a Croatian historian.

== Early life ==
Dizdar attended elementary school in Orolik near Vinkovci from grades 1 to 4 before spending grades 5 to 8 in his hometown of Oklaj. In 1962, he attended a grammar school in Zemun. He began studying history in 1966 at the University of Belgrade Faculty of Philosophy and graduated in 1970, before continuing his education at the University of Zagreb.

== Career ==
From 1972 to 1980, Dizdar worked as a curator at the Pounja Regional Museum in Bihać. He organized collections, published contributions, and arranged exhibitions on the history of Pounja from 1878 to 1945. Pounja is a micro-region in Croatia based around the Una River.

Under the Faculty of Philosophy in Zagreb in 1979, he published his Master's thesis The Workers' Movement in Pounja 1929–1941 and gained a doctorate with his dissertation "Chetnik War Crimes in Bosnia and Herzegovina from 1941 to 1945".

Since 1980, he has worked at the Croatian Institute for History in Zagreb.

== Recognition ==
- Ljubica Štefan Award in 2011.

== Works ==
- Radnički pokret u Pounju 1929-1941. 1980.
- Građa za povijest narodnooslobodilačke borbe u sjeverozapadnoj Hrvatskoj 1941-1945. knjiga I (ožujak-prosinac 1941.). Zbornik dokumenata. 1981.
- Građa za povijest NOB-e u sjevernozapadnoj Hrvatskoj 1941-1945. knjiga II (siječanj-lipanj 1942.). 1984.
- Građa za povijest NOB-e u sjevernozapadnoj Hrvatskoj 1941-1945. knjiga III (srpanj-prosinac 1942.). 1984.
- Dizdar, Zdravko; Picelj, Zdenko (1986). Narodnooslobodilačka borba u Žumberku i na Gorjancima , ( u koautorstvu sa Zdenkom Piceljem ml.). Novo Mesto.
- Samobor 1941 - 1945. Samobor. 1987.
- Žumberačka NOU brigada. Vojnoizdavački i novinski centar. 1989.
- Dizdar, Zdravko; Kujundžić, Milivoj (1995). Doprinos Hrvatske pobjedi antifašističke koalicije (2.dop.izd.). Committee for the Celebration of the 50th Anniversary of the Victory of the Anti-Fascist Coalition in Europe and the World of the Parliament of the Republic of Croatia. ISBN 9539664403.
- Životni miljokazi Mirka Validžića Ćelkanovića prominjskog književnika i kamenovanog župnika. Ogranak Matice hrvatske u Pazinu. 1996. ISBN 9536476045.
- Dizdar, Zdravko; Sobolevski, Mihael (1999). Prešućivani četnički zločini u Hrvatskoj i u Bosni i Hercegovini 1941.-1945. Croatian Institute of History. ISBN 9789536491285.
- Kujundžić, Milivoj; Dizdar, Zdravko (2000). Hrvatska borba za opstojnost : 1918. - 1998. Croatian National Parliament. ISBN 953966442X.
- Četnički zločini u Bosni i Hercegovini: 1941. - 1945. Croatian Institute of History. 2002. ISBN 9789536491865.
- Dizdar, Zdravko; Leček, Suzana (2003). Zagrebačka županija. ISBN 9539655455.
- Dizdar, Zdravko (2005). Geiger, Vladimir (ed.). Partizanska i komunistička represija i zločini u Hrvatskoj 1944.-1946: dokumenti. Croatian Institute of History. ISBN 9789536659364.
