= Orolik =

- Village (Selo)
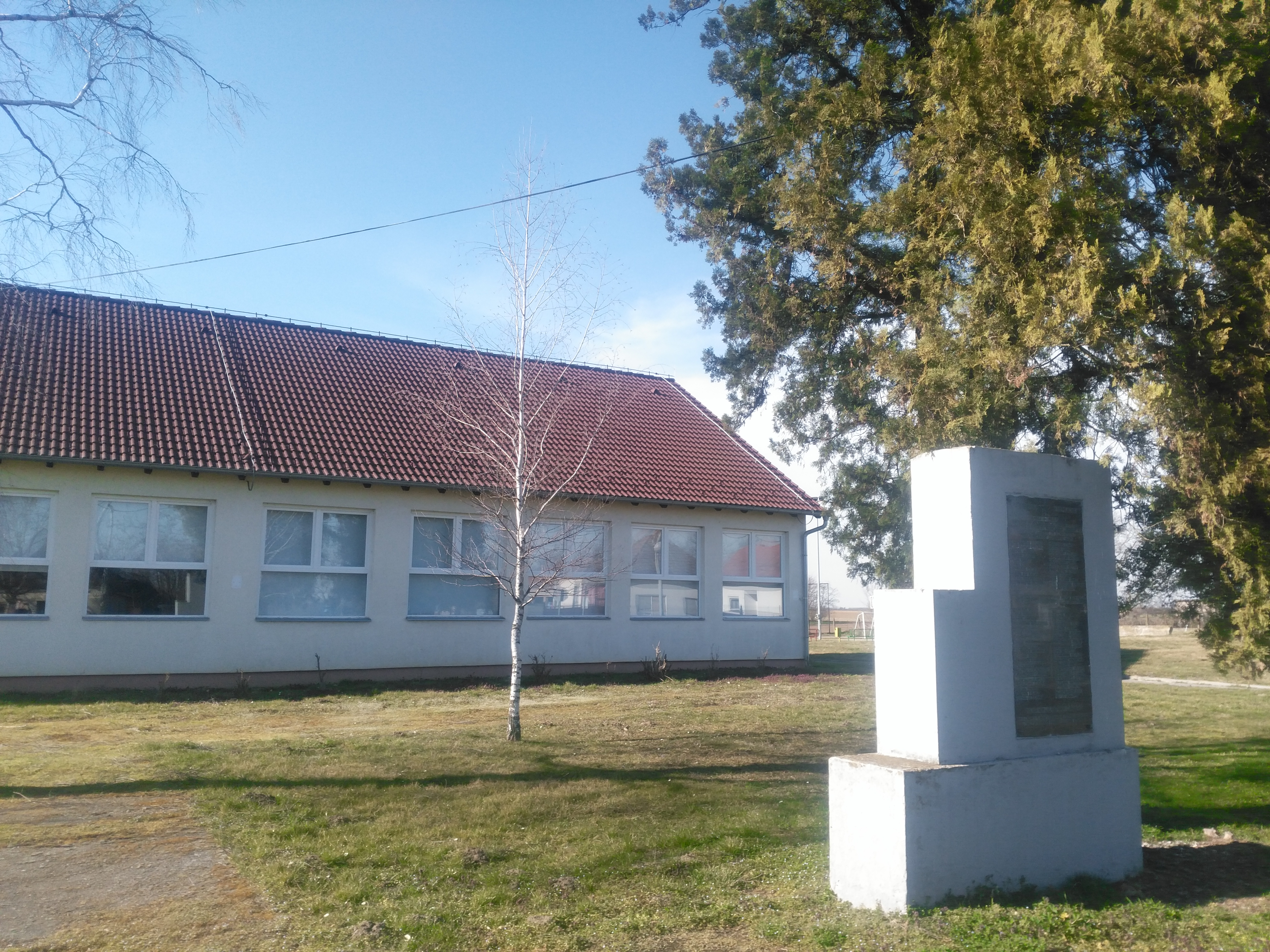
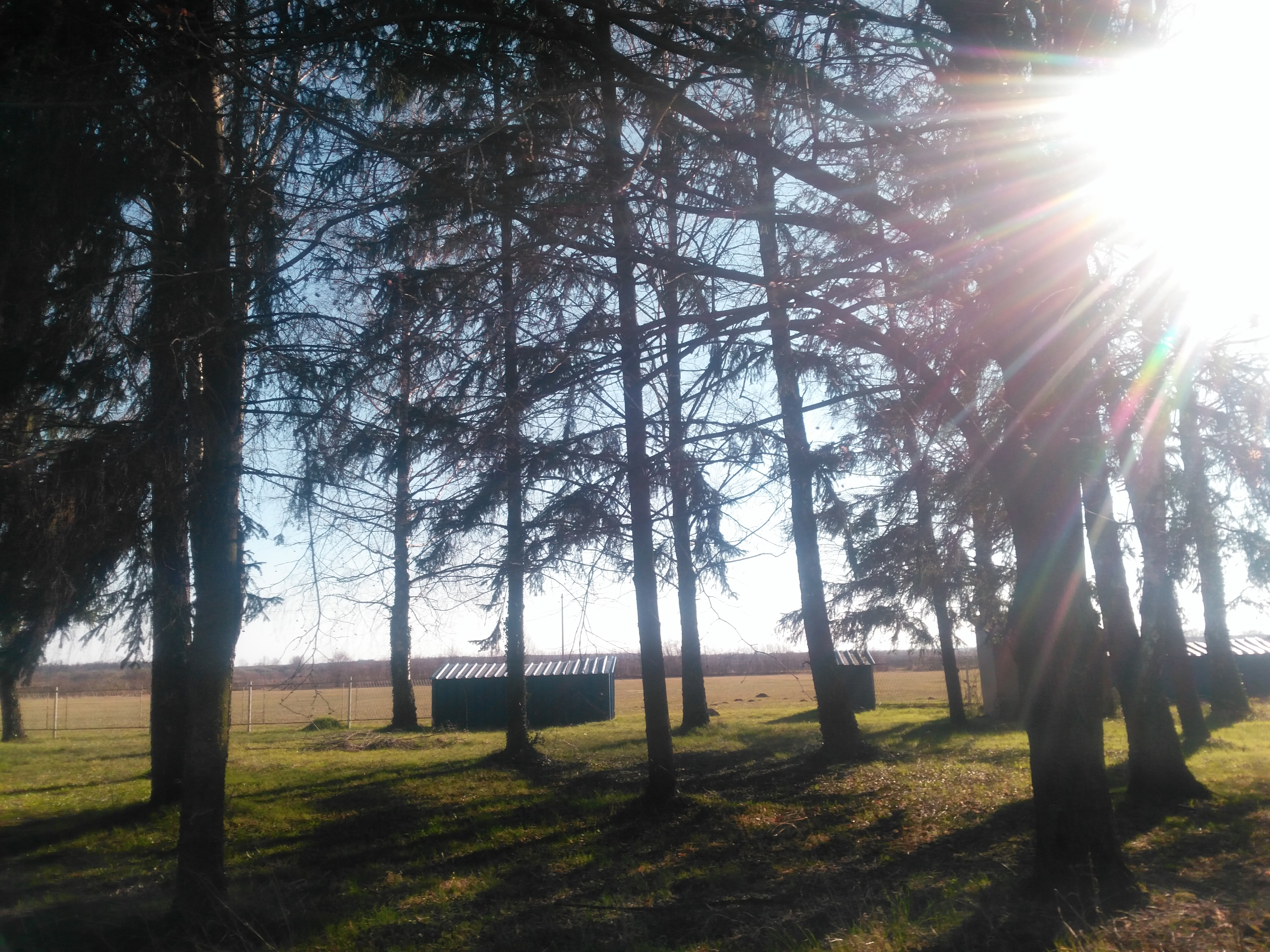
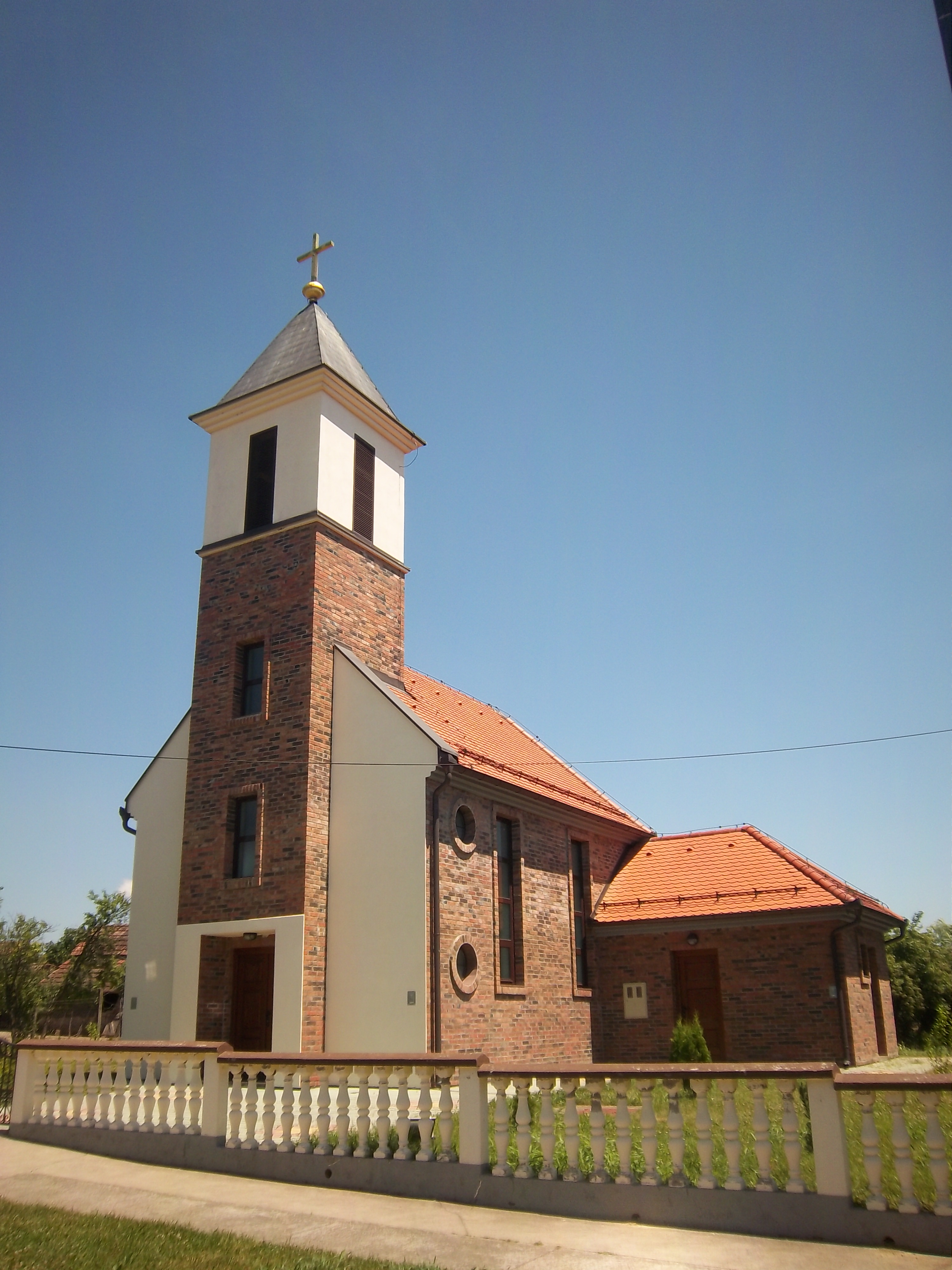
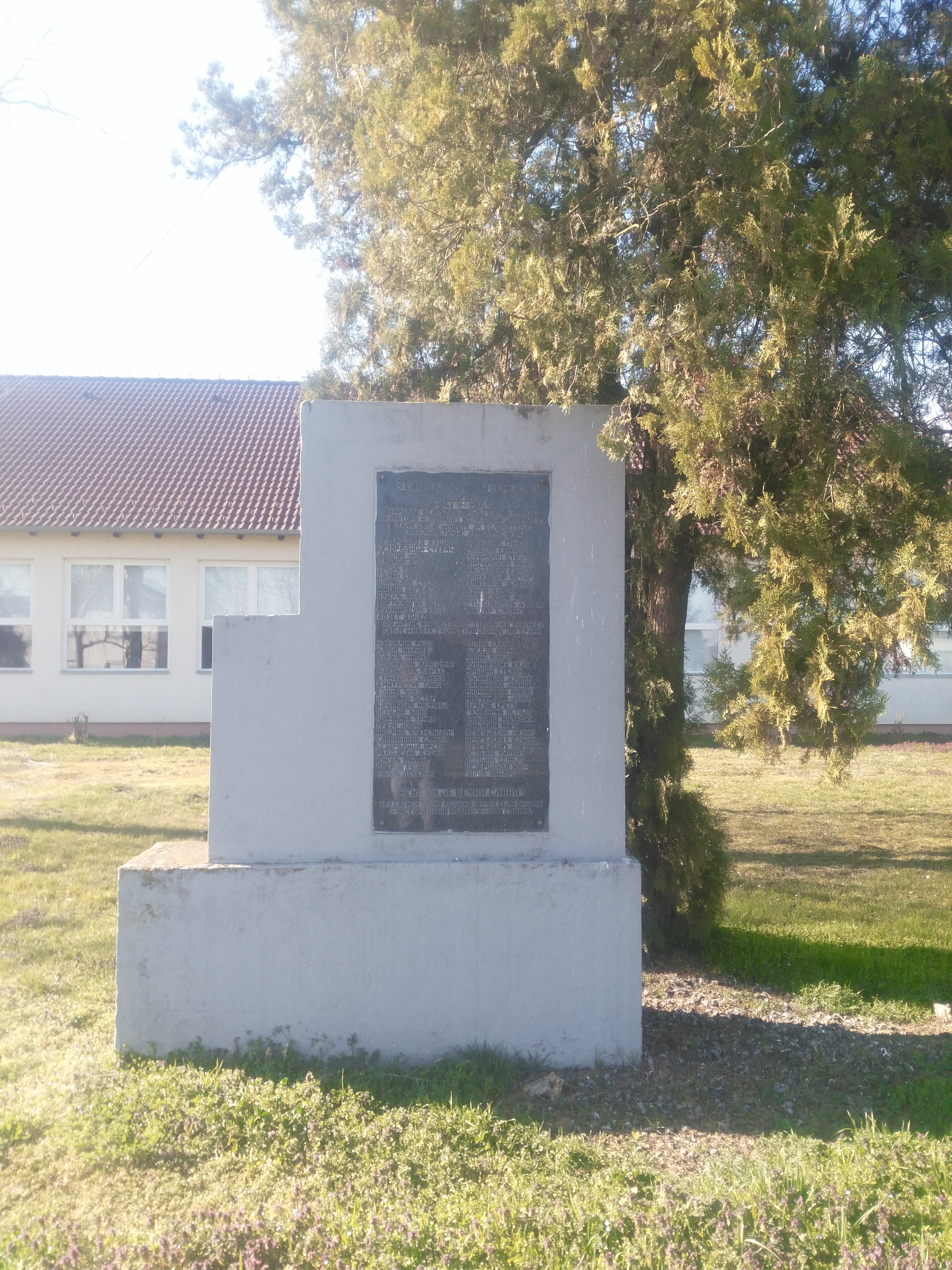
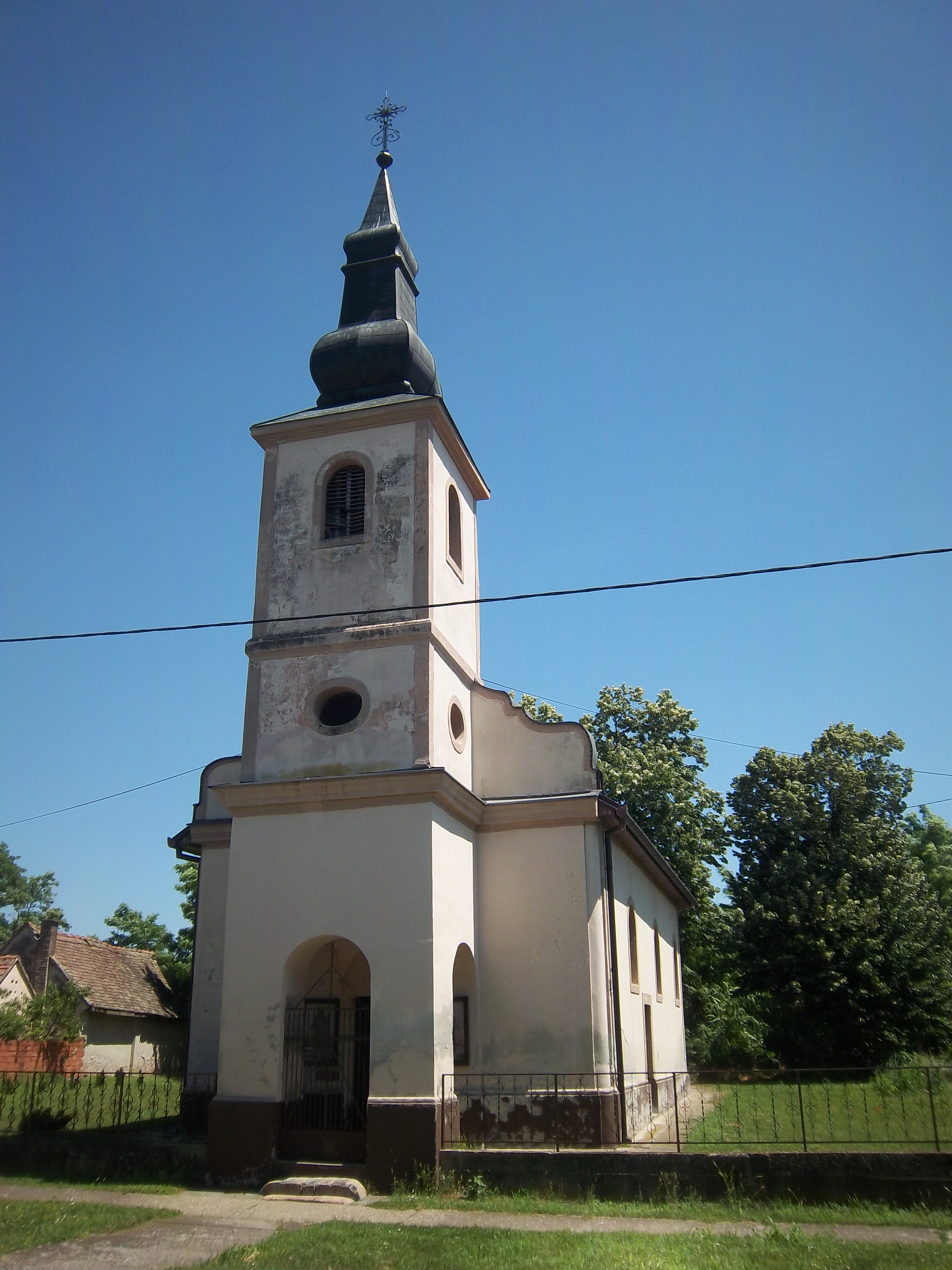
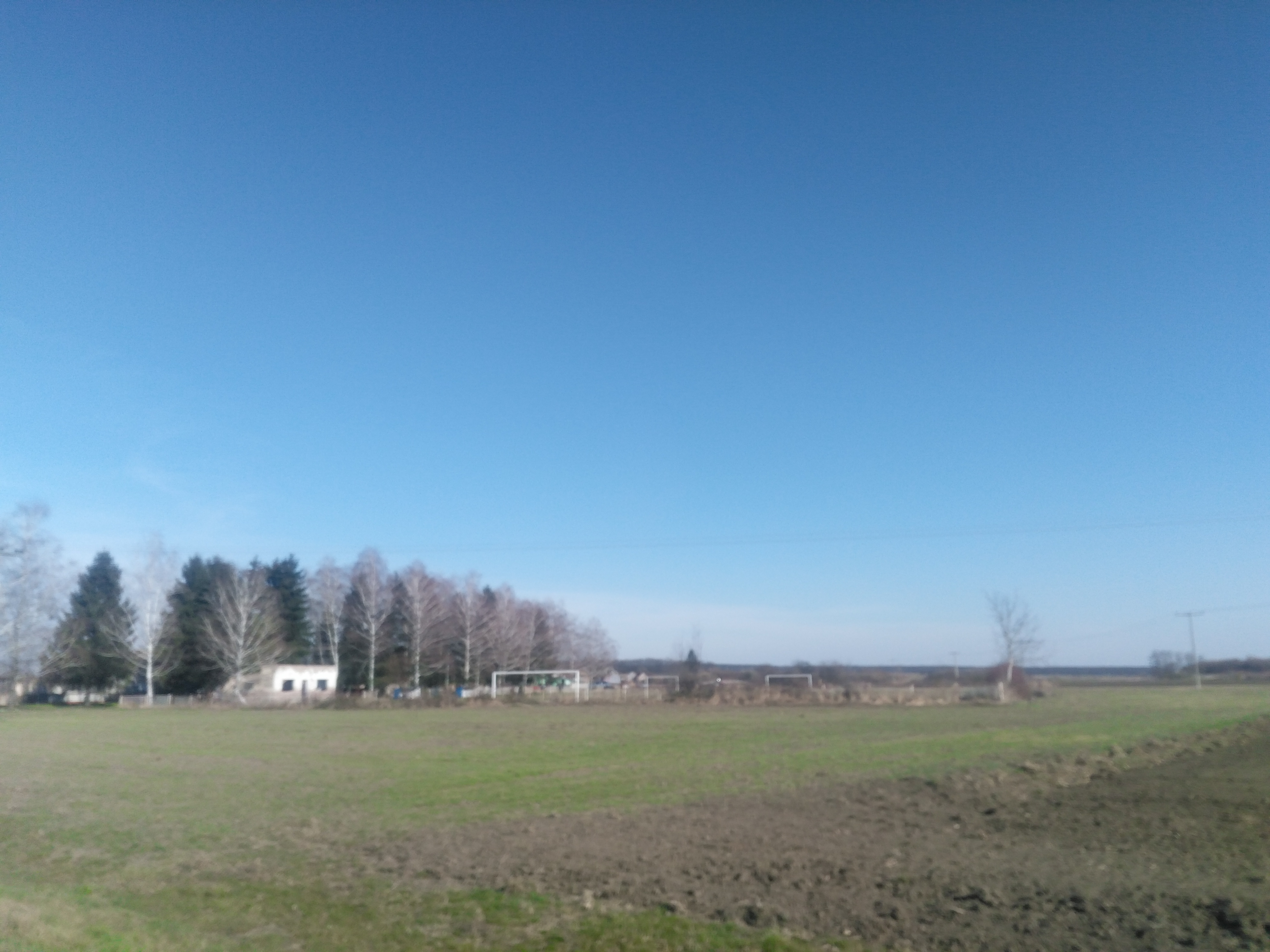
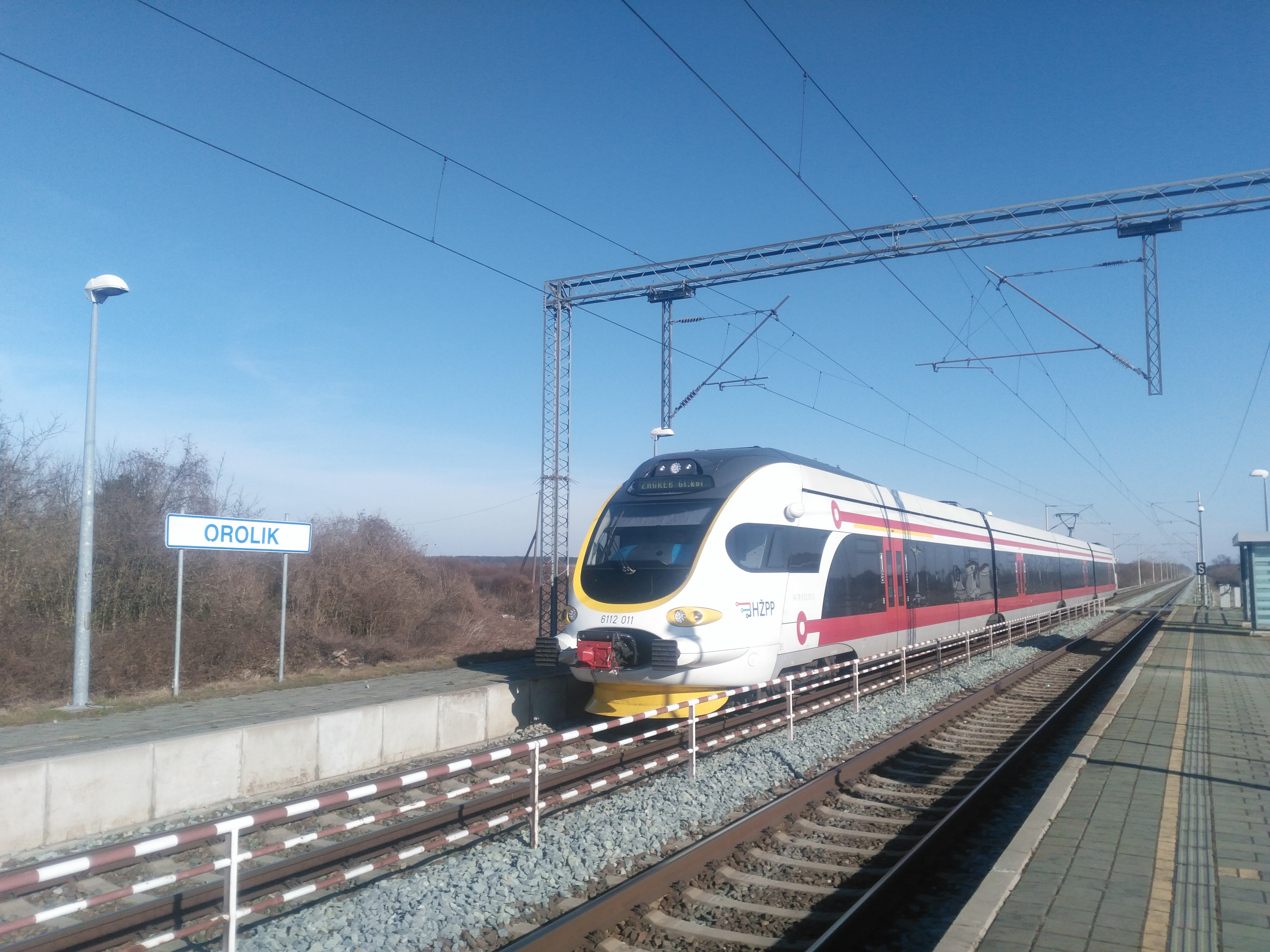

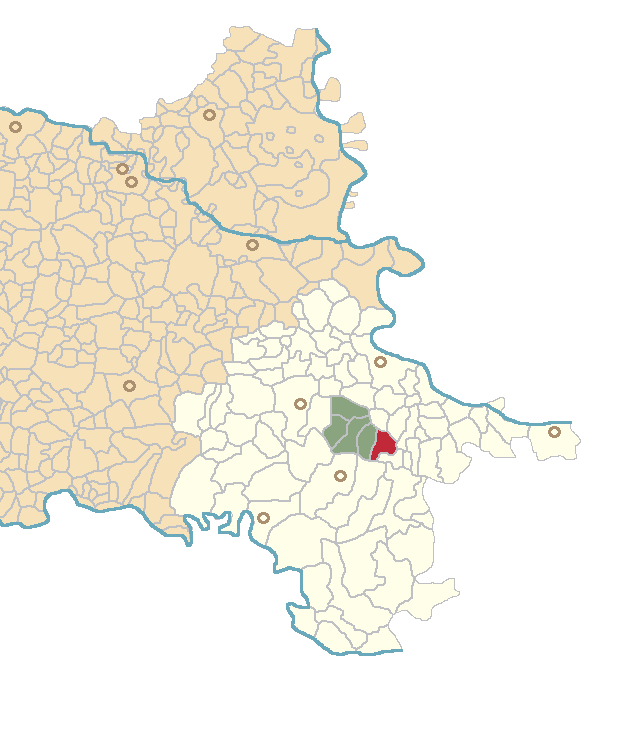

- Location within Vukovar-Syrmia County Location within Croatia Location within Europe
- Coordinates: 45°16′N 18°59′E
- Country: Croatia
- Region: Syrmia (Podunavlje)
- County: Vukovar-Syrmia
- Municipality: Stari Jankovci

Government
  - Body: Local Committee

Area
  - Total: 6.3 sq mi (16.4 km^{2})
- Elevation: 292 ft (89 m)

Population (2021)
  - Total: 355
  - Density: 56.1/sq mi (21.6/km^{2})
- Demonym(s): Oroličanin (♂) Oroličanka (♀) (per grammatical gender)
- Time zone: UTC+1 (CET)
  - Summer (DST): UTC+2 (CEST)
- Postal code: 32 243 Orolik
- Vehicle registration: VK

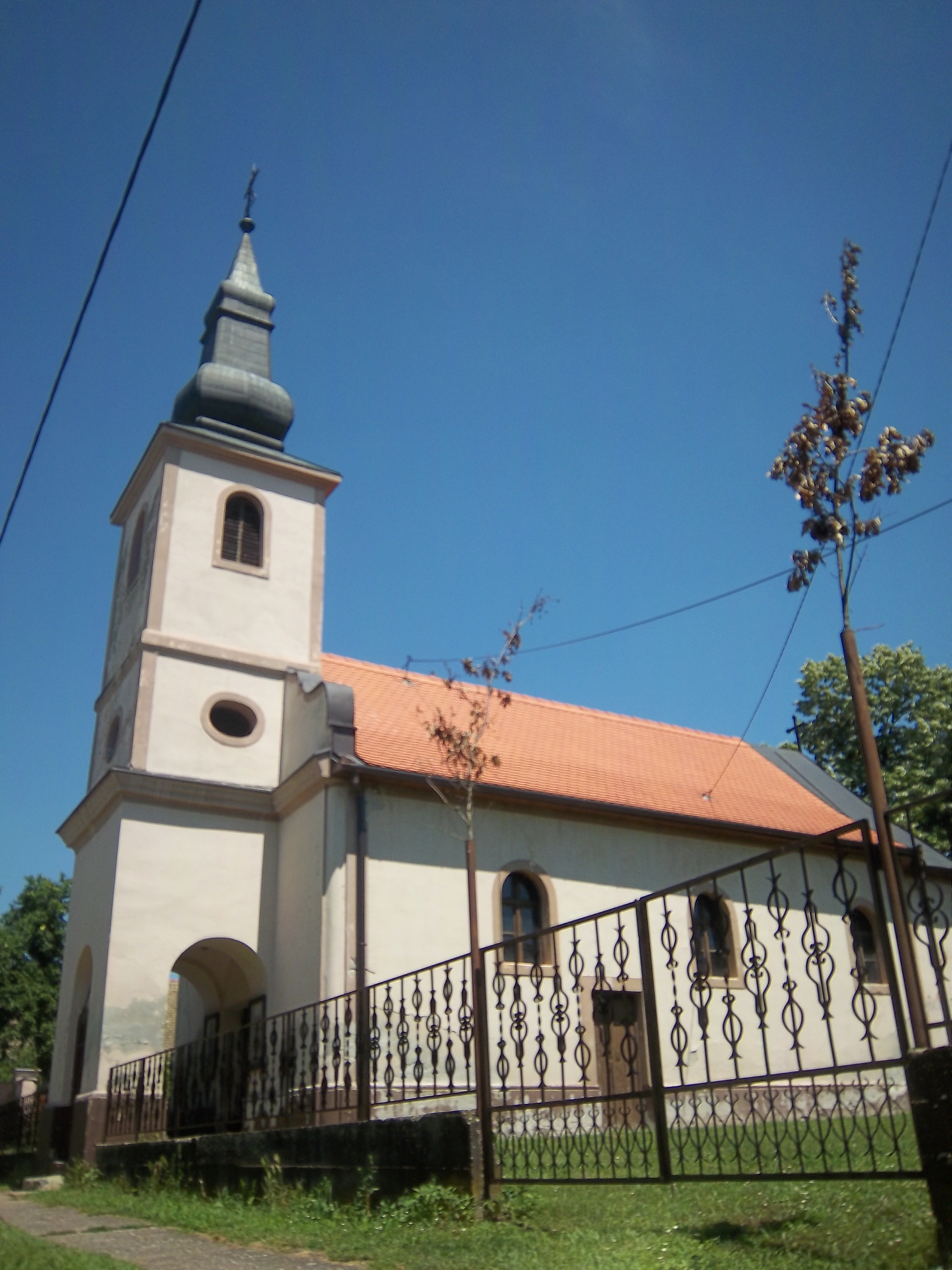
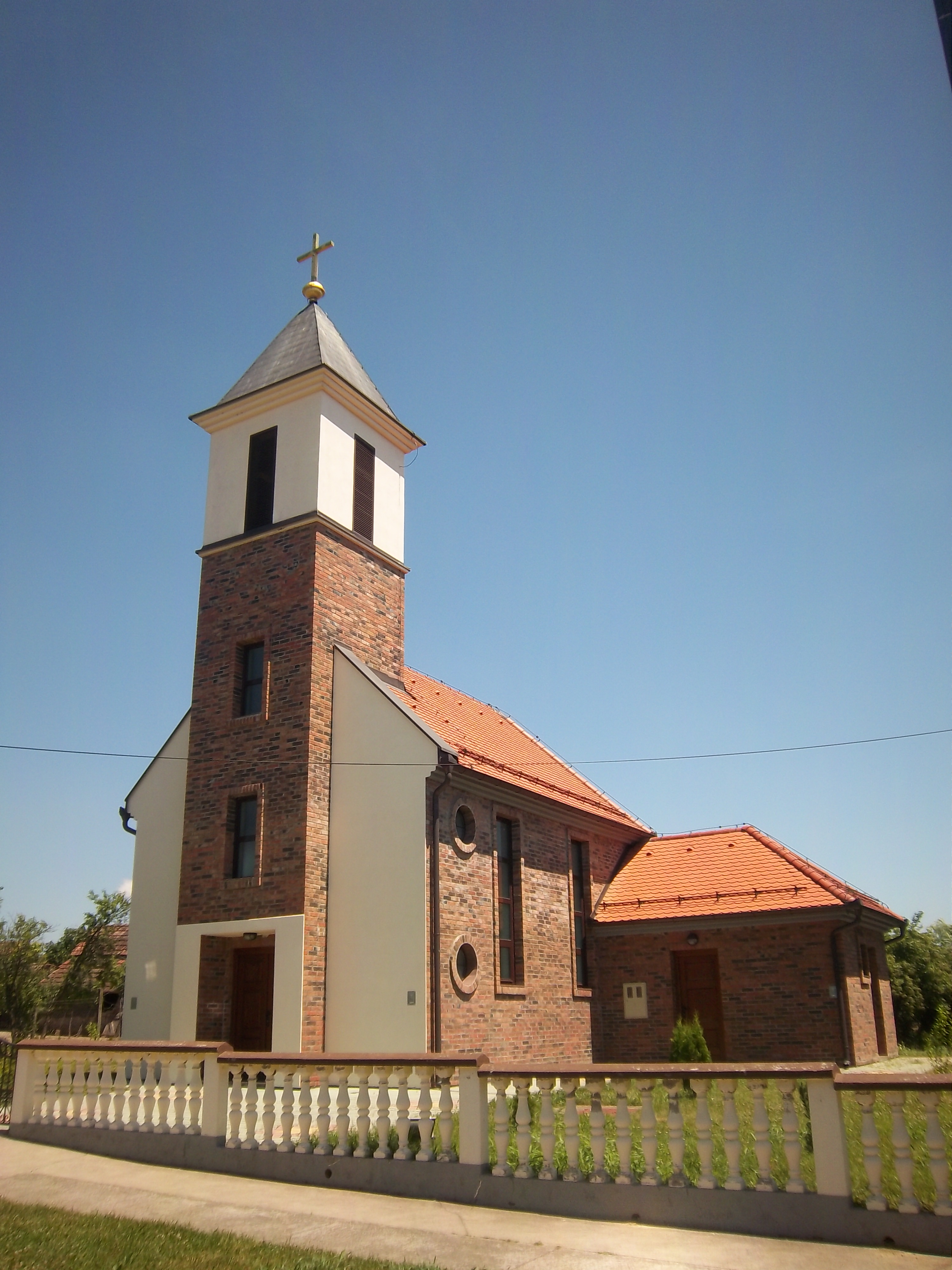
Serbian Orthodox Church of St. Peter and Paul and Roman Catholic church

Orolik (Serbian Cyrillic: Оролик) is a village in the Stari Jankovci municipality, Vukovar-Syrmia County, in eastern Croatia. The village is connected with the rest of the country by the D46 state road connecting it with the town of Vinkovci and continuing into Serbia as the State Road 120 to the nearest town of Šid, D57 road and by the M105 railway.

== History ==
One archaeological site in Orolik dating back to the Iron Age in Europe period was excavated in the 1970s and 1980s as a part of rescue excavations in eastern Croatia. This archaeological site was a settlement of the late La Tène culture settlement network of the Scordisci in the area of Vinkovci. First excavations of Scordisci sites began in late 19th century during the time of Austro-Hungarian Empire.

Orolik was established in the 16th century during the Ottoman rule in Hungary. During this period most of the population were Catholic Croats who remained in the village after the Treaty of Karlowitz. In 1715 the local church register records that there were 19 inhabited houses total in the entire village. During the next decade Hofkammer in Vienna settled 20 families of Eastern Orthodox Vlachs or Serbs in the village. Following Ottoman retreat from the region, the Lordship of Vukovar was established, and the village became part of its domain in 1716 until 1737 when it was transferred back to Slavonian Military Frontier. In 1866 there was 205 Orthodox and 106 Roman Catholic families in the village.

According to the 1890 census, Orolik had 936 inhabitants, of which 521 were Roman Catholics, 384 Orthodox, 20 Jews, 5 Lutherans, 5 Nazarenes and 1 Greek Catholic.

In 1942, Lazar "Lazo" (Stojan) Kanurić (1888, Orolik – Jasenovac, 1942), a Serb civilian and JRZ politician, died in the Jasenovac concentration camp.

On 19 December 1993 UNPROFOR peacekeeping forces were attacked by local Serb residents of the village.

== See also ==
- Orolik railway station
- Church of St. Peter and Paul, Orolik
- Zdravko Dizdar

== Bibliography ==
- Geiger, Vladimir; Šola, Pero (2017-10-31). "Žrtvoslov Malog Nabrđa – Drugi svjetski rat i poraće: pokušaj revizije podataka o ljudskim gubitcima nestalog i zaboravljenog slavonskog sela" [The List of Victims of Malo Nabrđe – World War II and the Post-War Period: An Attempt of Data Revision on Human Losses in a Vanished and Forgotten Slavonian Village]. Scrinia Slavonica: Godišnjak Podružnice za povijest Slavonije, Srijema i Baranje Hrvatskog instituta za povijest (in Serbo-Croatian). 17: 291–378. eISSN 1848-9109.
