= Stari Mikanovci railway station =

Railway station in Croatia

Coordinates: 45°16′0″N 18°32′29″E

Stari Mikanovci
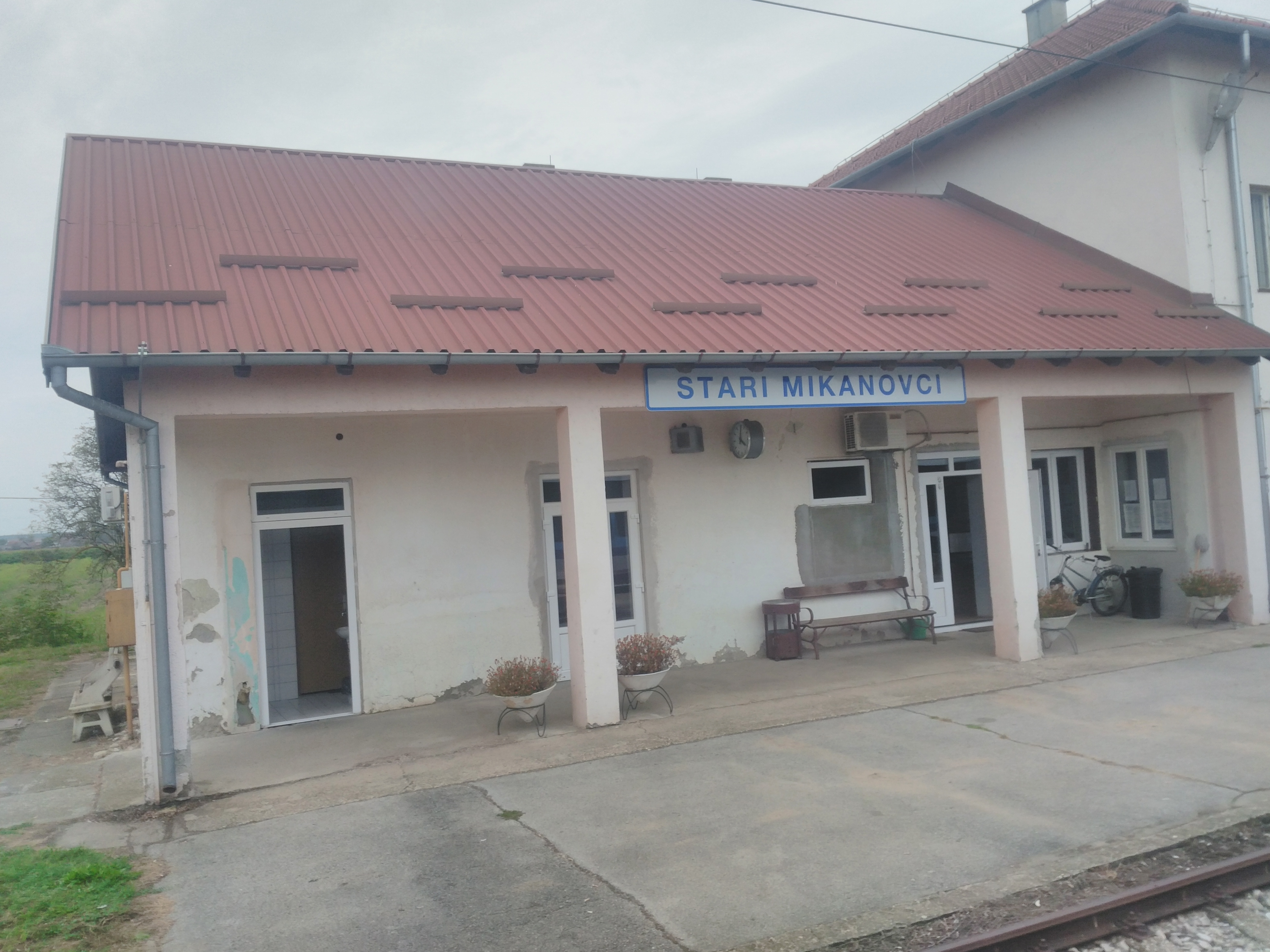

General information
- Location: Croatia
- Tracks: 5
Location

Stari Mikanovci railway station (Croatian: Željeznička stanica Stari Mikanovci) is a railway station on Novska–Tovarnik railway. Located in Stari Mikanovci. Railroad continued to Strizivojna–Vrpolje in one and the other direction to Ivankovo. Stari Mikanovci railway station consists of 5 railway track.

== See also ==
- Croatian Railways
- Zagreb–Belgrade railway
