= Bartolovci =

Coordinates: 45°11′N 17°56′E

- Village
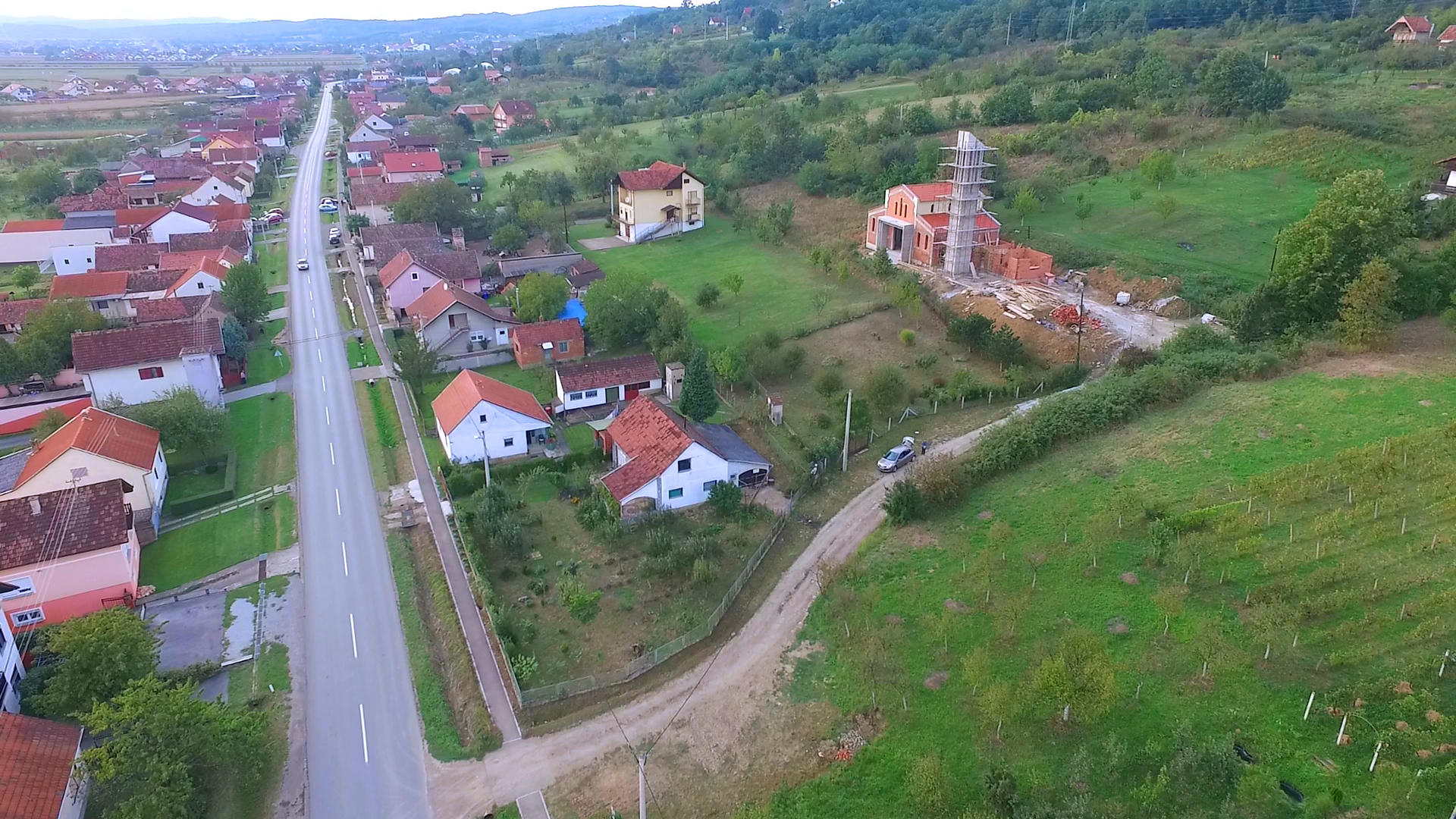
- Interactive map of Bartolovci
- Country: Croatia
- County: Brod-Posavina County

Area
  - Total: 3.2 km^{2} (1.2 sq mi)

Population (2021)
  - Total: 637
  - Density: 200/km^{2} (520/sq mi)
- Time zone: UTC+1 (CET)
  - Summer (DST): UTC+2 (CEST)

Bartolovci is a village in Croatia.
