= Retkovci =

Coordinates: 45°14′N 18°39′E

- Village
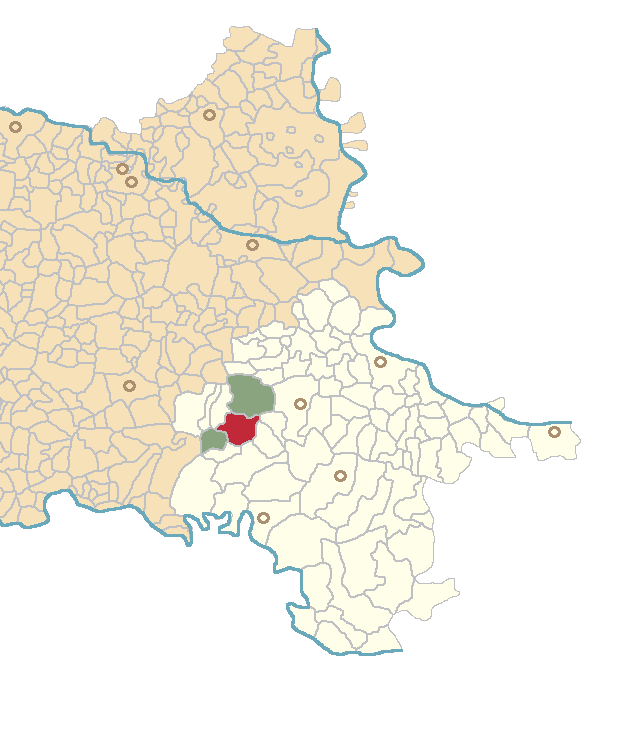
- Country: Croatia
- County: Vukovar-Syrmia
- Municipality: Ivankovo

Area
  - Total: 12.5 sq mi (32.5 km^{2})

Population (2021)
  - Total: 1,011
  - Density: 80.6/sq mi (31.1/km^{2})
- Time zone: UTC+1 (CET)
  - Summer (DST): UTC+2 (CEST)
- Vehicle registration: VK

Retkovci is a village in Croatia.

== Name ==
The name of the village in Croatian is plural.
