= D57 road =

Road in Croatia

D57 state road

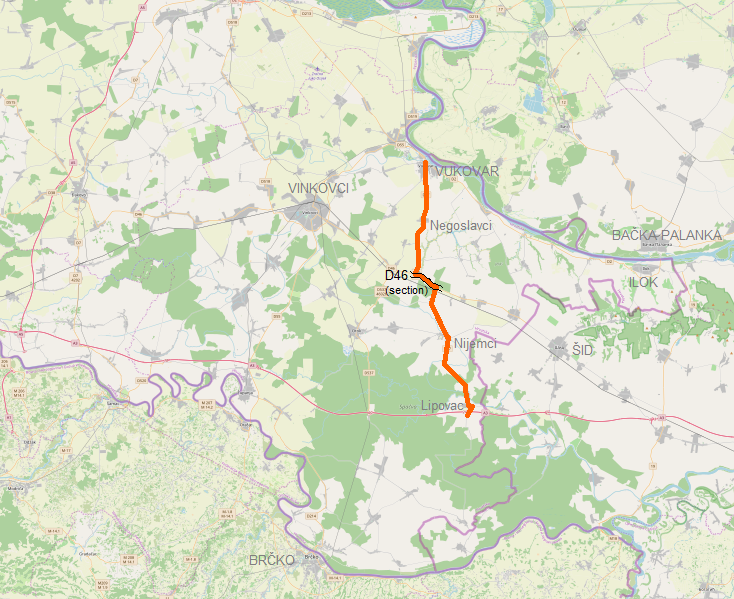

Route information
- Length: 36.1 km (22.4 mi)

Major junctions
- From: D2 in Vukovar
- D46 in Orolik
- To: A3 in Lipovac interchange

Location
- Country: Croatia
- Counties: Vukovar-Srijem
- Major cities: Vukovar

Highway system
- Highways in Croatia

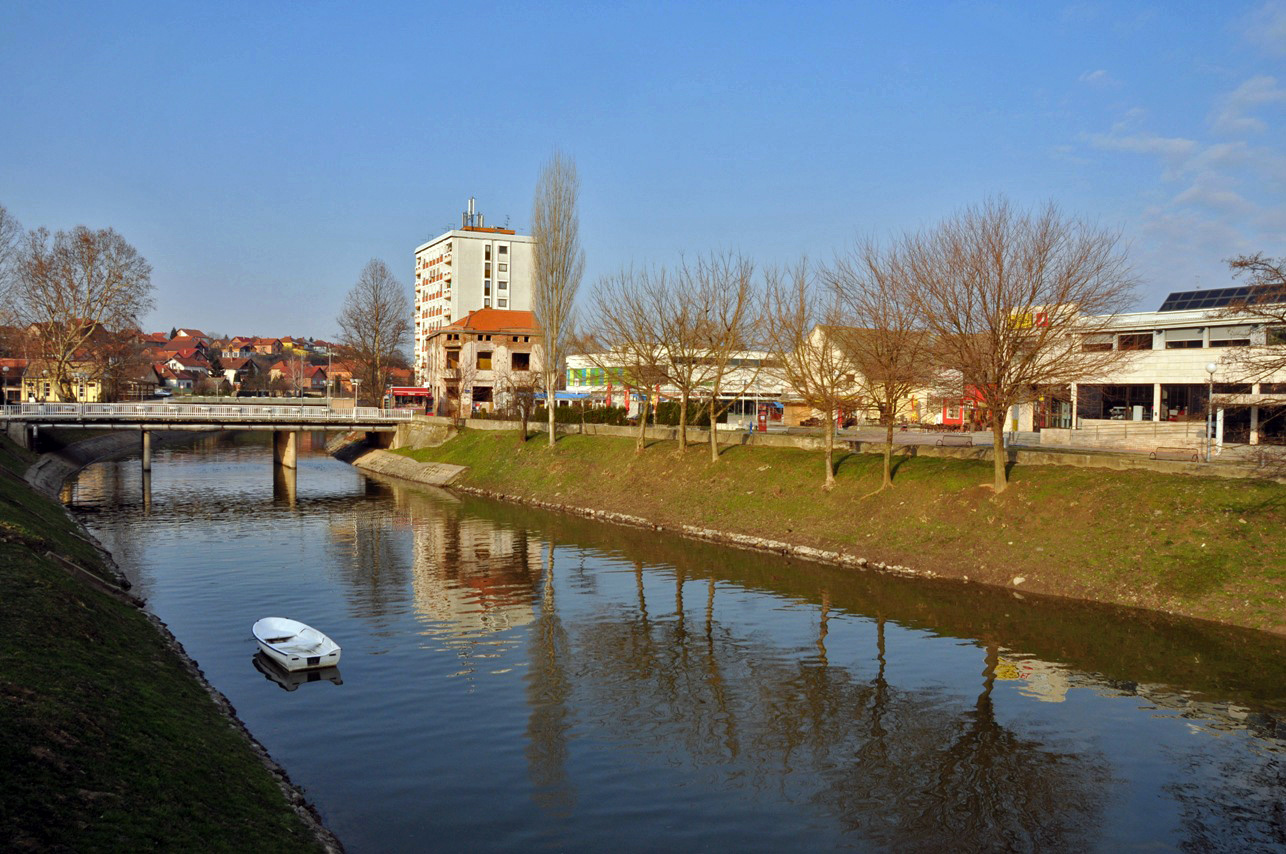
Vukovar, at the northern terminus of the D57 road

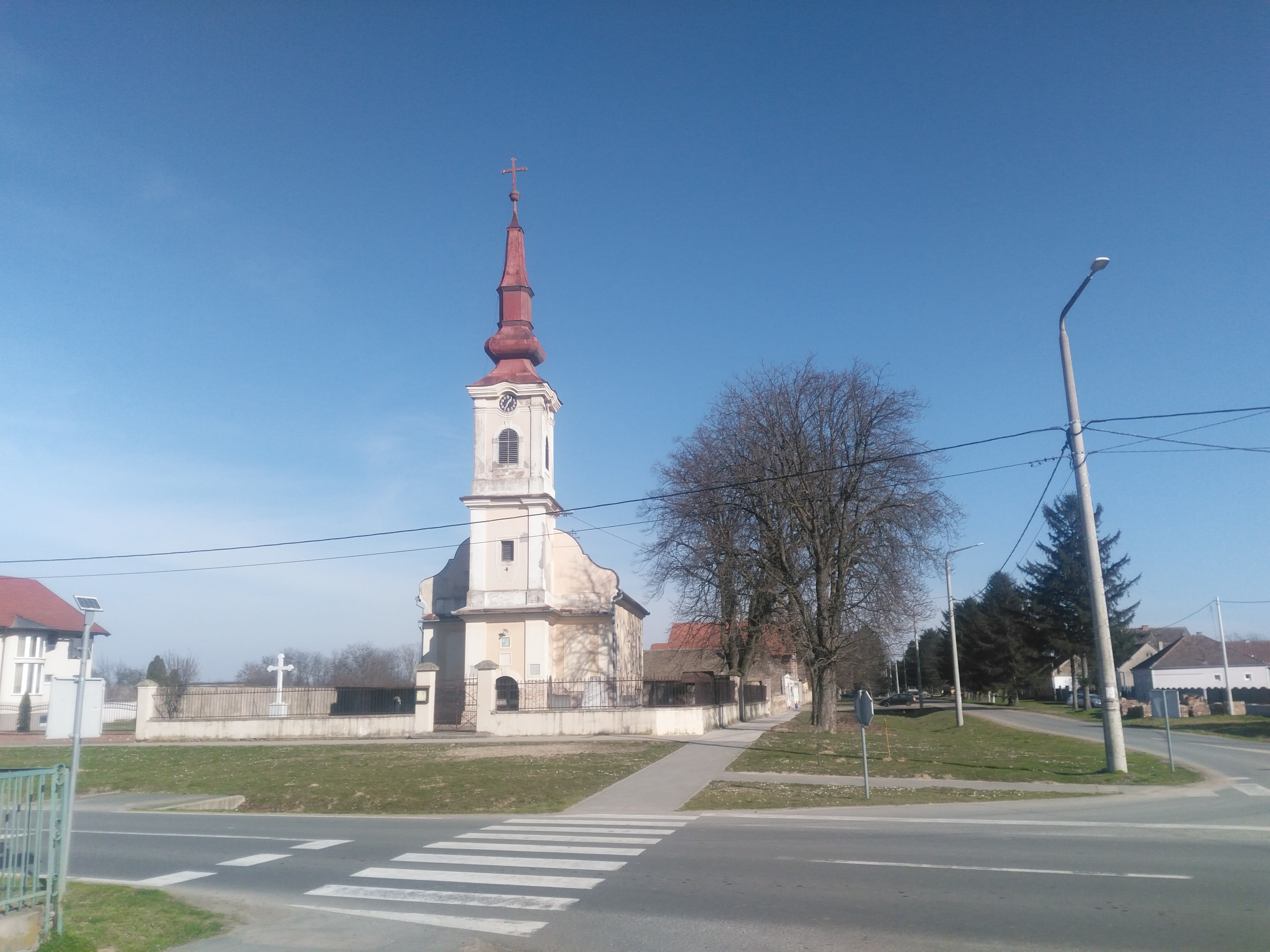
Church of the Dormition of the Theotokos, Negoslavci

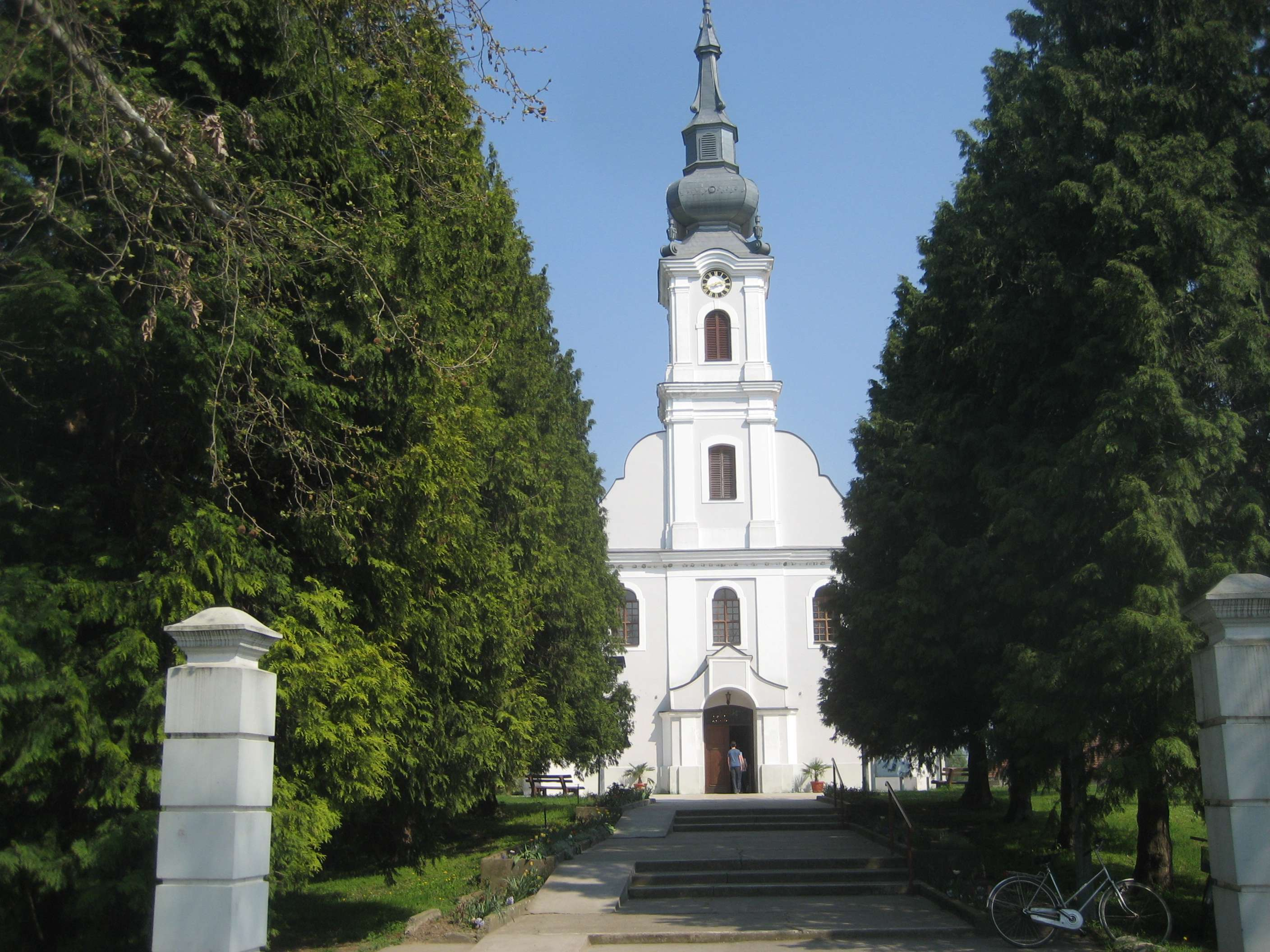
Nijemci, located on the D57 route

D57 state road in the eastern part of Croatia connects the city of Vukovar to the state road network of Croatia, and to the A3 motorway in Lipovac interchange. The road is 36.1 km (22.4 mi) long. The route comprises some urban intersections, mostly in the city of Vukovar.

The road, as well as all other state roads in Croatia, is managed and maintained by Hrvatske ceste, a state-owned company.

== Traffic volume ==
Traffic is regularly counted and reported by Hrvatske ceste, operator of the road.

D57 traffic volume
Road	Counting site	AADT	ASDT	Notes
D57	3802 Negoslavci south	1,154	1,362	Adjacent to the Ž4195 junction.
D57	3805 Lipovac north	310	476	Adjacent to the L46061 junction.

== Road junctions and populated areas ==
D57 junctions/populated areas
Type	Slip roads/Notes
	Vukovar; D2 to Osijek (to the west) and to Ilok (to the east). The northern terminus of the road.
	Negoslavci; Ž4150 to Petrovci and Stari Jankovci
	Ž4195 to Svinjarevci
	Ž4196 to Berak, Čakovci and Mikluševci
	Orolik; D46 to Vinkovci (to the west). The D57 and the D46 are concurrent to the east.
	D46 to Tovarnik (to the east). The D57 and the D46 are concurrent to the west.
	Đeletovci
	Nijemci; Ž4224 to Otok. Ž4233 to Tovarnik.
	Podgrađe
	Apševci
	Lipovac; L46061 looping from the D57 road, forming two intersections.
	A3 to Zagreb and Slavonski Brod (to the west) and to Belgrade, Serbia (to the east). The southern terminus of the road.
