= Ivankovo, Croatia =

Ivankovo
- Municipality
- Municipality of Ivankovo; Općina Ivankovo
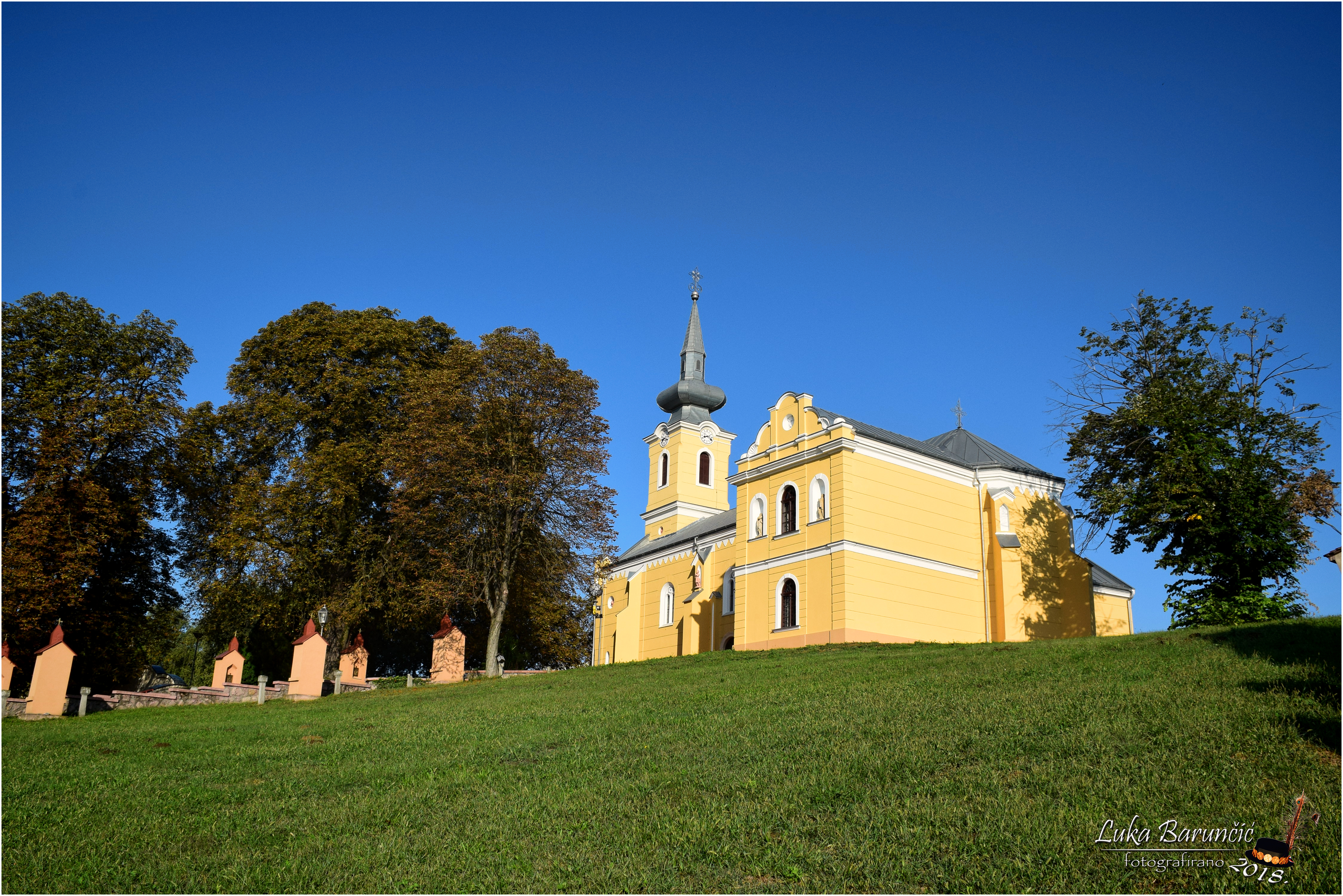

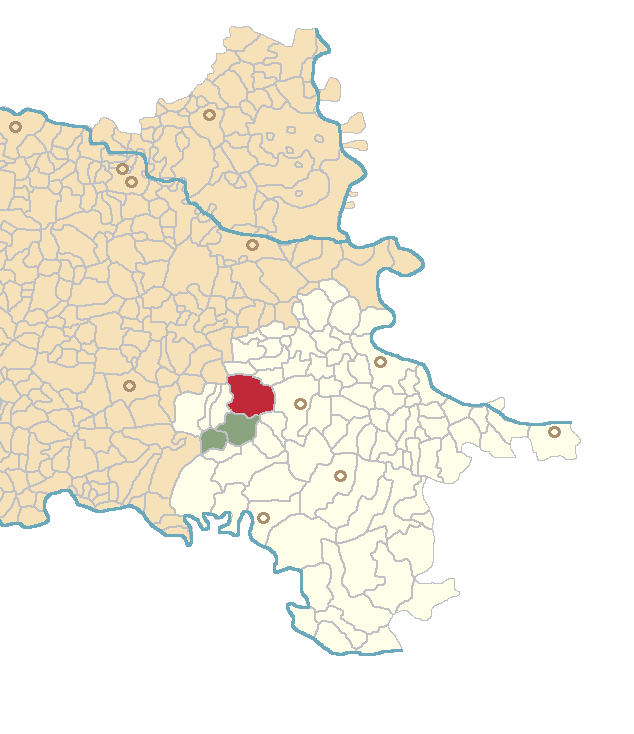

- Location in Croatia Ivankovo (Croatia) Ivankovo (Europe)
- Coordinates: 45°17′N 18°41′E
- Country: Croatia
- County: Vukovar-Syrmia County

Area
  - Municipality: 103.6 km^{2} (40.0 sq mi)
  - Urban: 54.6 km^{2} (21.1 sq mi)

Population (2021)
  - Municipality: 6,543
  - Density: 63.16/km^{2} (163.6/sq mi)
  - Urban: 5,076
  - Urban density: 93.0/km^{2} (241/sq mi)
- Time zone: UTC+1 (CET)
  - Summer (DST): UTC+2 (CEST)
- Postal code: 32281
- Area code: +385 32
- Vehicle registration: VK
- Website: opcina-ivankovo.hr

Ivankovo (Hungarian: Ivánkaszentgyörgy) is a village and a municipality in the Vukovar-Syrmia County, Slavonia in Croatia. It is located approximately 10 kilometres (6 miles) west of Vinkovci.

The total population is 8,006 (census 2011), in the following settlements:

- Ivankovo, population 6,194
- Prkovci, population 549
- Retkovci, population 1,263

In the 2011 census, of the 8,006 inhabitants, 99.66% were Croats.

== See also ==
- Ivankovo railway station
