= Stari Mikanovci =

- Municipality
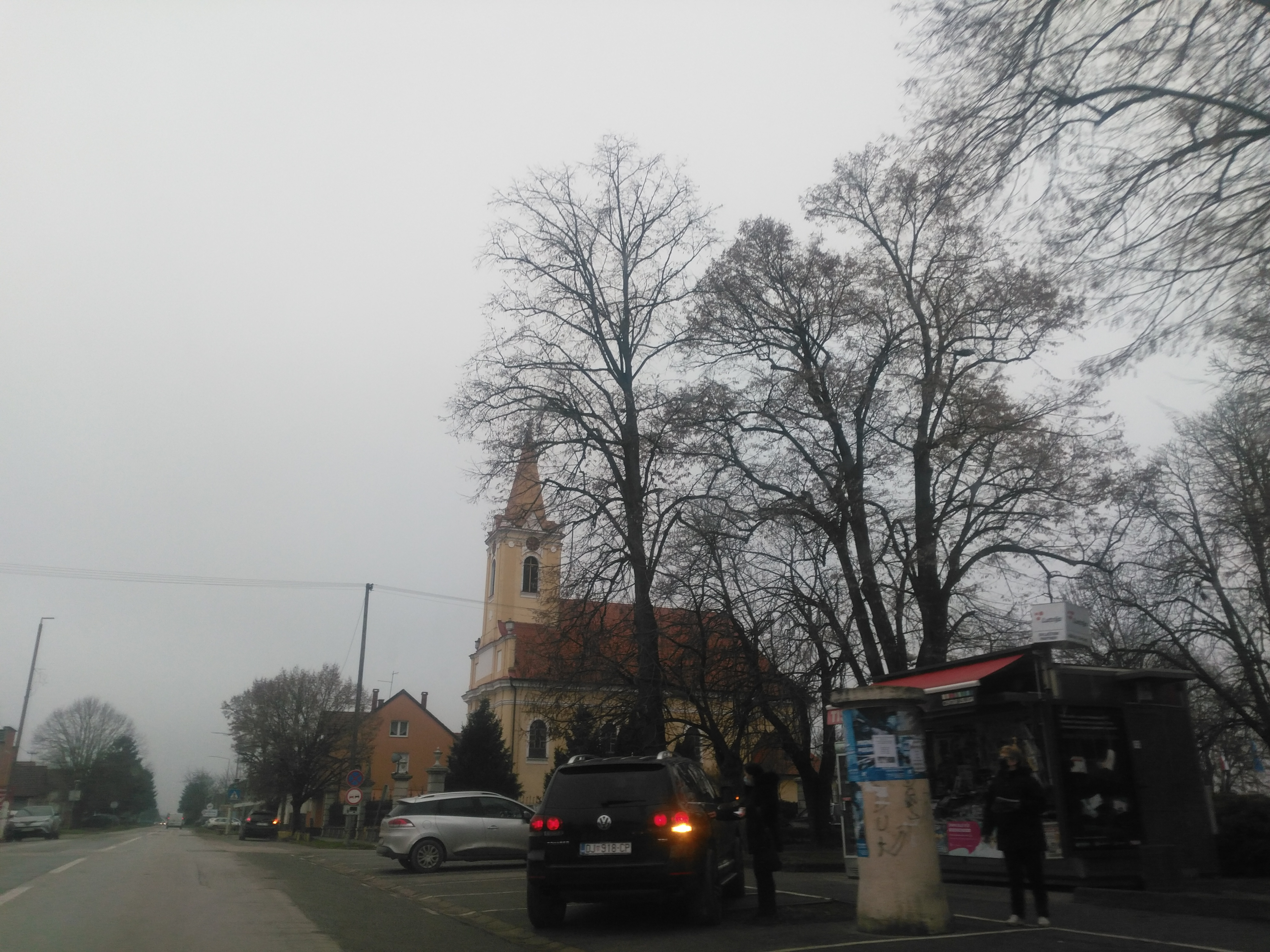
- Stari Mikanovci

- Flag Seal

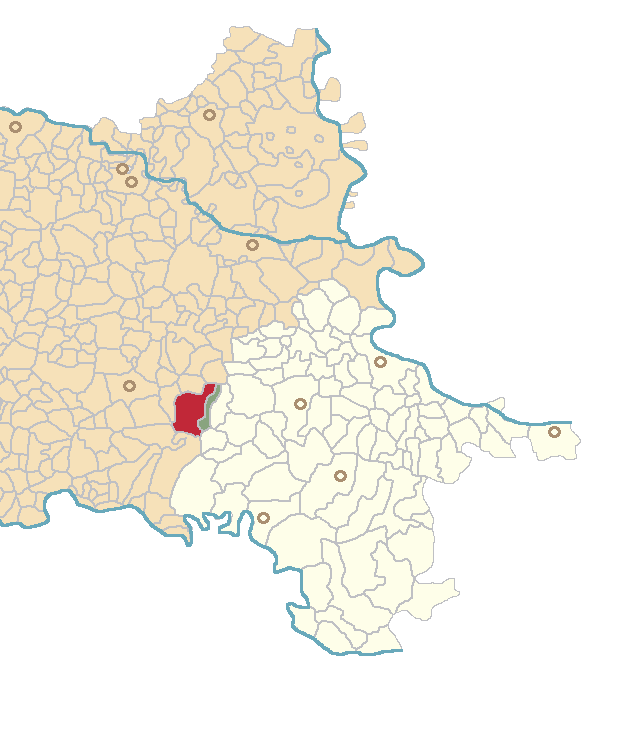

- Location in Croatia Stari Mikanovci (Croatia) Stari Mikanovci (Europe)
- Coordinates: 45°17′N 18°33′E
- Country: Croatia
- County: Vukovar-Syrmia County

Government
  - Municipal Council: SDP 5 (representatives), HDZ 4, HSS 2, NL 1

Area
  - Municipality: 54.4 km^{2} (21.0 sq mi)
  - Urban: 44.1 km^{2} (17.0 sq mi)

Population (2021)
  - Municipality: 2,419
  - Density: 44.5/km^{2} (115/sq mi)
  - Urban: 1,883
  - Urban density: 42.7/km^{2} (111/sq mi)
- Time zone: UTC+1 (CET)
  - Summer (DST): UTC+2 (CEST)
- Postal code: 32284
- Area code: 032
- Vehicle registration: VK
- Website: mikanovci.hr

Stari Mikanovci (Hungarian: Horváti, German: Sankt Michael) is a village in Croatia, located in the eastern part of the large Croatian historic and geographic region of Slavonia, situated in the westernmost part of the smaller Croatian historic and geographic region of Srijem.

== Name ==
The name of the village in Croatian is plural.

== Geography ==
Geographic coordinates of Stari Mikanovci: +45° 17' 8.43" (or 45.285674), +18° 33' 28.83" (or 18.558009).

Stari Mikanovci is a middle-size Slavonian village with specific rur-urban physiognomy. Village physio-morphologic features are characteristic for the geo-historic region of Srijem (so called "ušorena sela") and other parts of lowland Croatia such as Turopolje, Posavina, Podravina and Međimurje.

Village name Stari Mikanovci literally means Old Mikanovci, while Novi Mikanovci means New Mikanovci.

== Administrative organisation ==
Stari Mikanovci is part of the Vukovarsko-srijemska županija (Vukovar-Syrmia County) located on the western part of the county and borders with Osječko-baranjska županija. The Municipality of Stari Mikanovci consists of two settlements: Stari Mikanovci and Novi Mikanovci. The municipality centers are the municipal council office and the municipal mayor office which are located within Stari Mikanovci.

== Population ==
Census	Municipality	Stari Mikanovci	Novi Mikanovci
1991	3400		
2001	3387		
2011	2956	2383	573

== History ==
One Scordisci archaeological site in Stari Mikanovci dating back to late La Tène culture was excavated in the 1970s and 1980s as a part of rescue excavations in eastern Croatia. Archaeological site was a part of the settlement network of Scordisci in the area of Vinkovci.

The village was a fief of the Order of St. John between the 13th and 15th century, and after that owned by the noble families Horvat and Gorjanski during the Ottoman wars in the region. After the Turks were pushed back, Mikanovci was owned by the Diocese of Đakovo and the village of Novi Mikanovci was built by the administration of the Military Frontier. The parish church of St. Claire in Stari Mikanovci is dated 1810 and the church of St. Bartholomew in Novi Mikanovci is from the early 13th century, it also was once at the cemetery of the old Mikanovci.

In July 1943, during the World War II in Yugoslavia, Nazi forces destroyed agricultural machinery, including threshers, across several villages, including Stari Mikanovci.

== See also ==
- Stari Mikanovci railway station
