= Prkovci =

Coordinates: 45°13′N 18°37′E

- Village
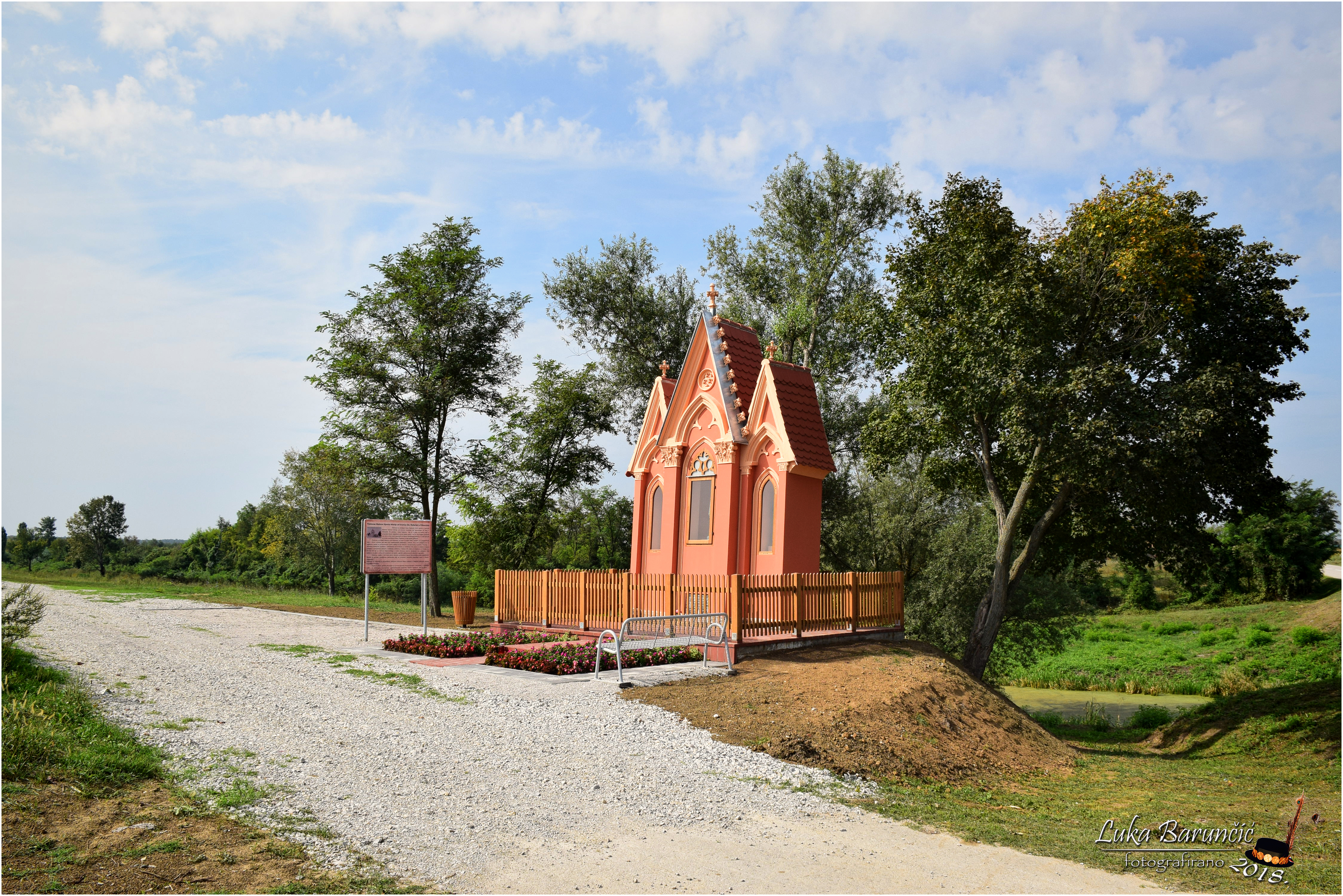

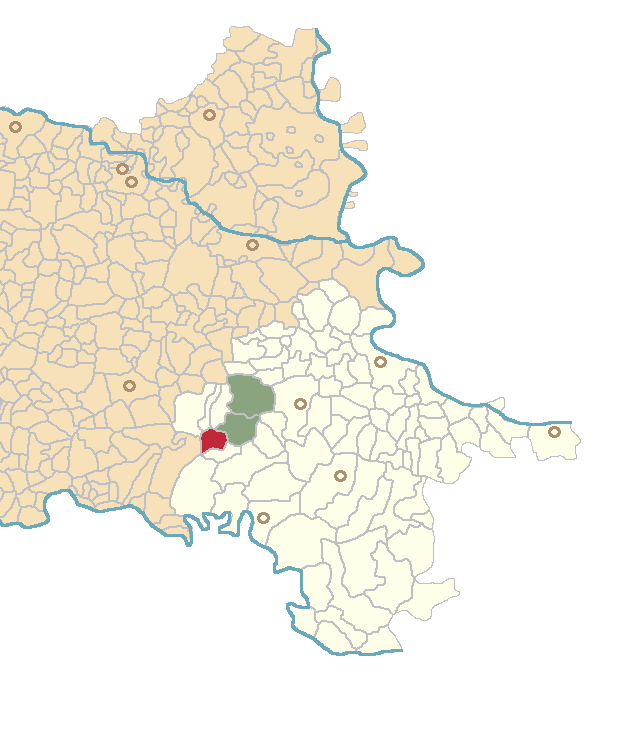
- Country: Croatia
- County: Vukovar-Syrmia
- Municipality: Ivankovo

Area
  - Total: 16.5 km^{2} (6.4 sq mi)

Population (2021)
  - Total: 456
  - Density: 27.6/km^{2} (71.6/sq mi)
- Time zone: UTC+1 (CET)
  - Summer (DST): UTC+2 (CEST)
- Vehicle registration: VK

Prkovci is a village in Croatia.

== Name ==
The name of the village in Croatian is plural.
