= List of Serbian Orthodox churches in Croatia =

As of 2021, the Records of Religious Communities in the Republic of Croatia listed 431 "organizational units" of the Serbian Orthodox Church in Croatia, many of which are local parishes with their own churches. Protection of the properties of cultural importance is among other general provisions defined by the Agreement between the Republic of Croatia and the Serbian Orthodox Church.

== Metropolitanate of Zagreb and Ljubljana ==
- Cathedral of the Transfiguration of the Lord, Zagreb
- Church of St. George, Varaždin
- Church of St. George, Grubišno Polje
- Church of St. George, Veliki Poganac
- Church of the Nativity of the Theotokos, Mali Zdenci
- Church of Lazarus of the Four Days, Plavšinac
- Church of St. George, Kutinica, Krajiška Kutinica
- Church of St. Nicolas, Velika Bršljanica
- Church of St. Demetrius, Stupovača
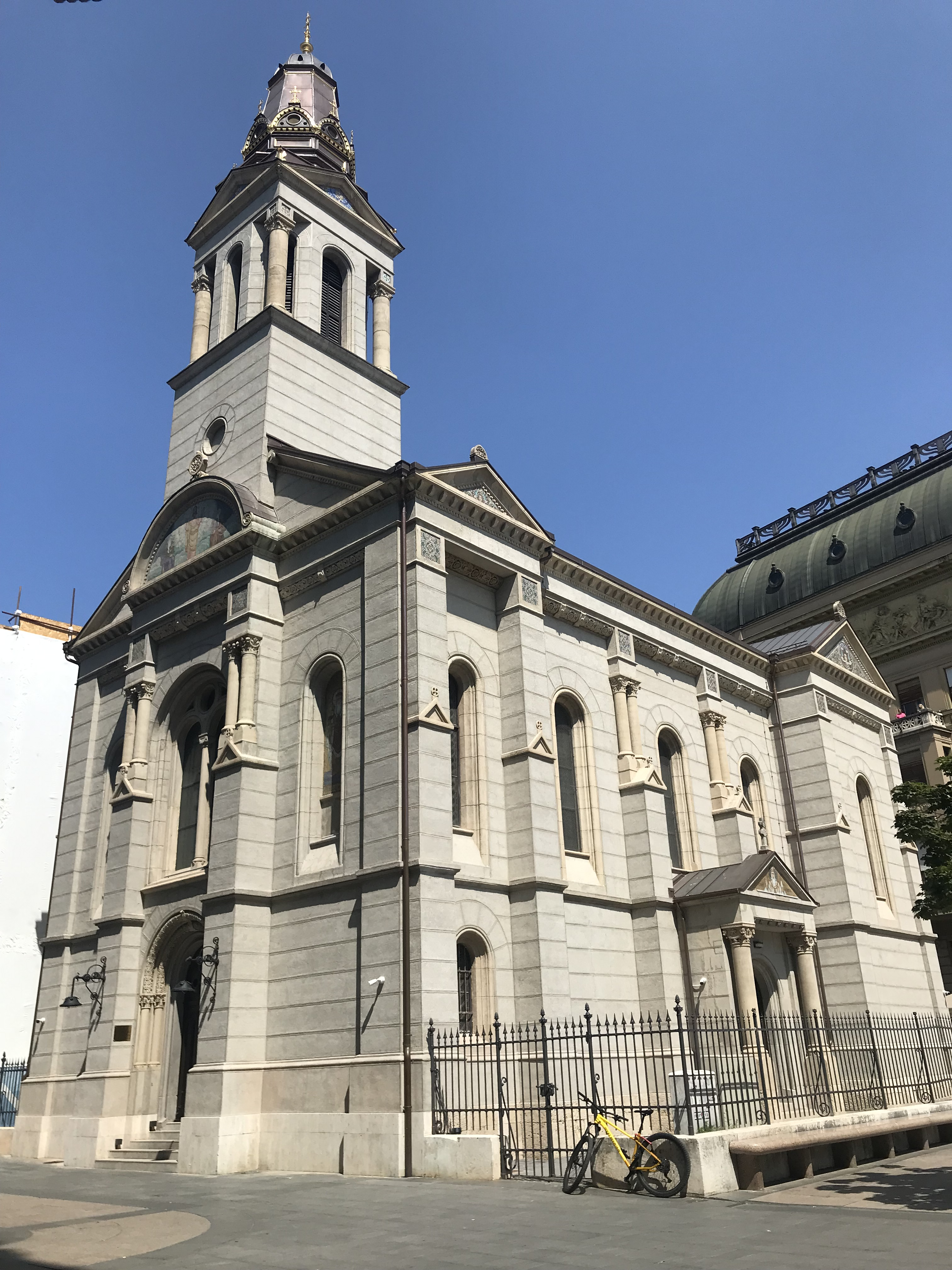
Cathedral of the Transfiguration of the Lord, Zagreb

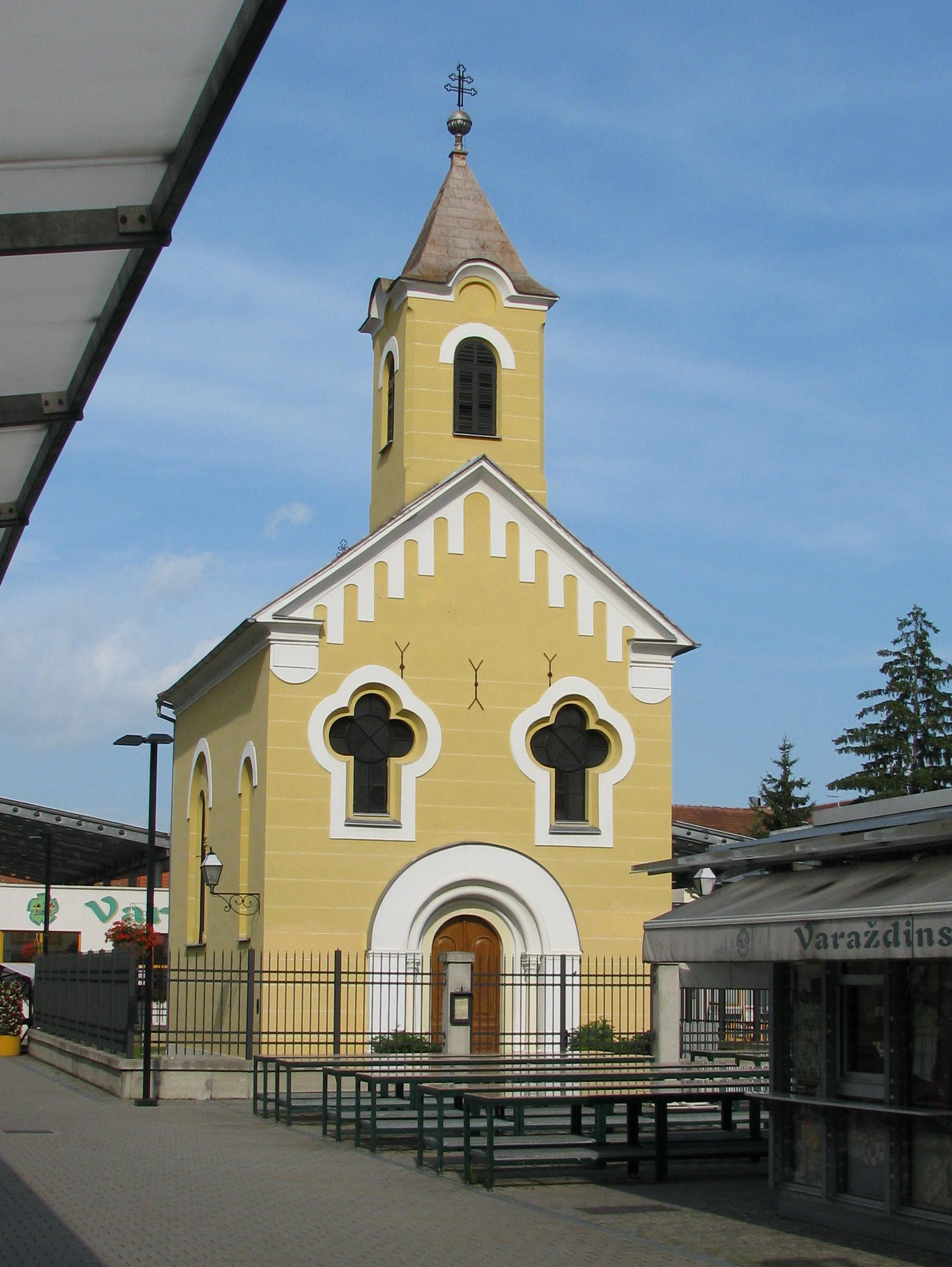
Church of St. George, Varaždin

== Eparchy of Dalmatia ==
- Cathedral of the Dormition of the Theotokos, Šibenik
- Church of the Intercession of the Theotokos, Knin
- Church of St. Nicholas, Vrlika
- Church of the Ascension of the Lord, Cetina
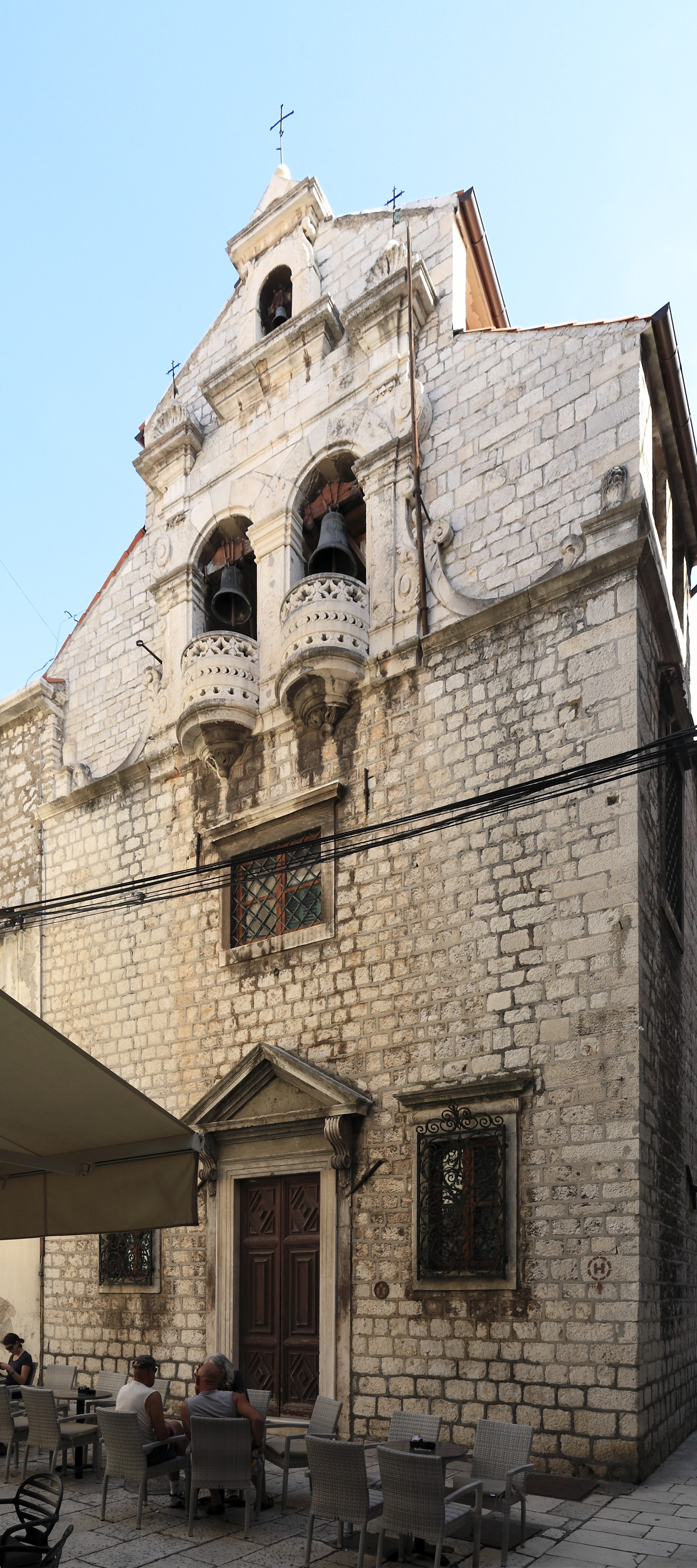
Cathedral of the Dormition of the Theotokos, Šibenik

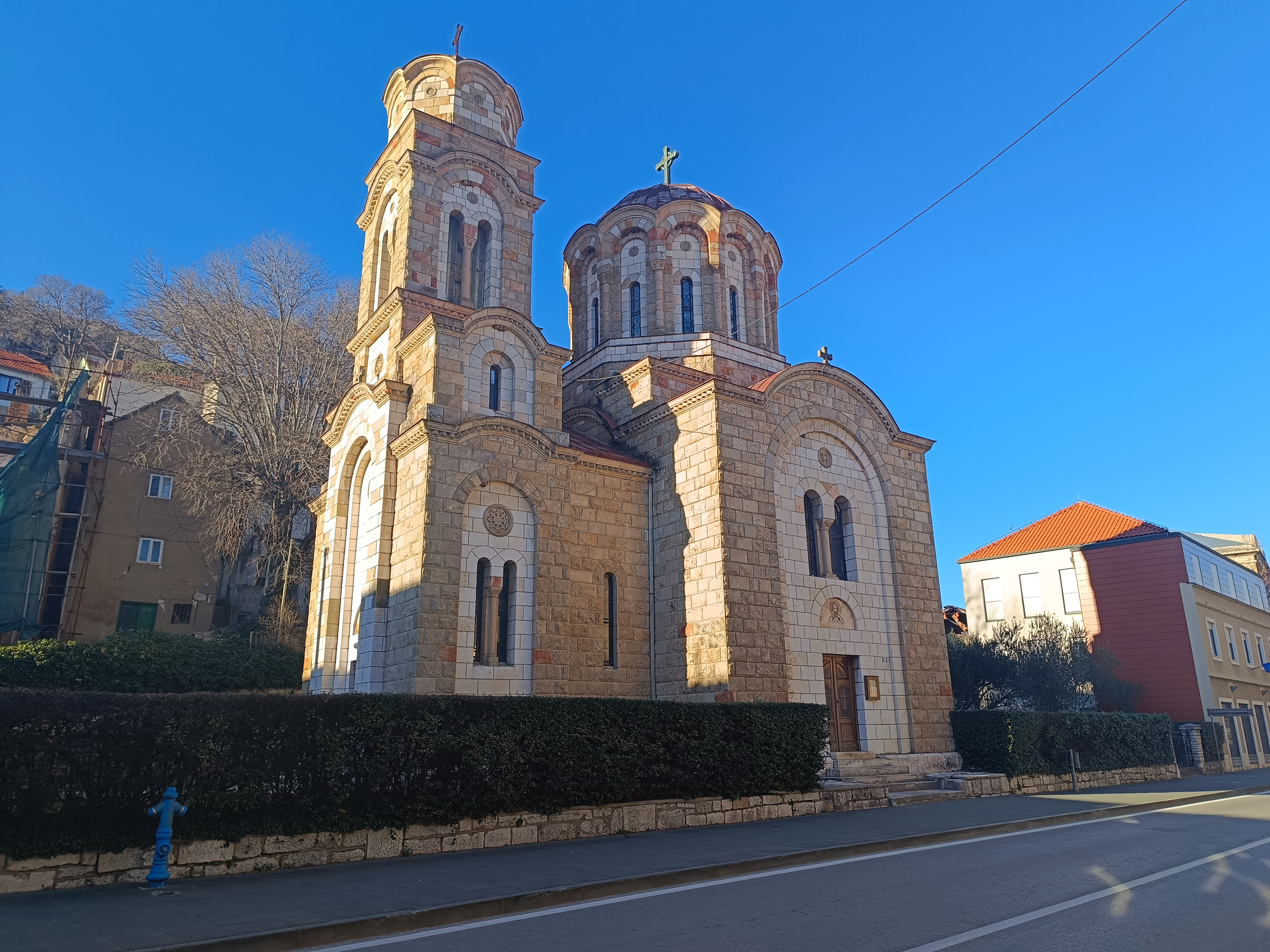
Church of the Intercession of the Theotokos, Knin

== Eparchy of Gornji Karlovac ==
- Saint Nicholas Cathedral, Karlovac
- Church of St. Nicholas, Rijeka
- Church of St. Spyridon, Peroj
- Church of Sts. Peter and Paul, Tepljuh
- Church of the Nativity of the Theotokos, Drežnica
- Church of Sts. Peter and Paul, Štikada
- Church of St. Petka, Slabinja
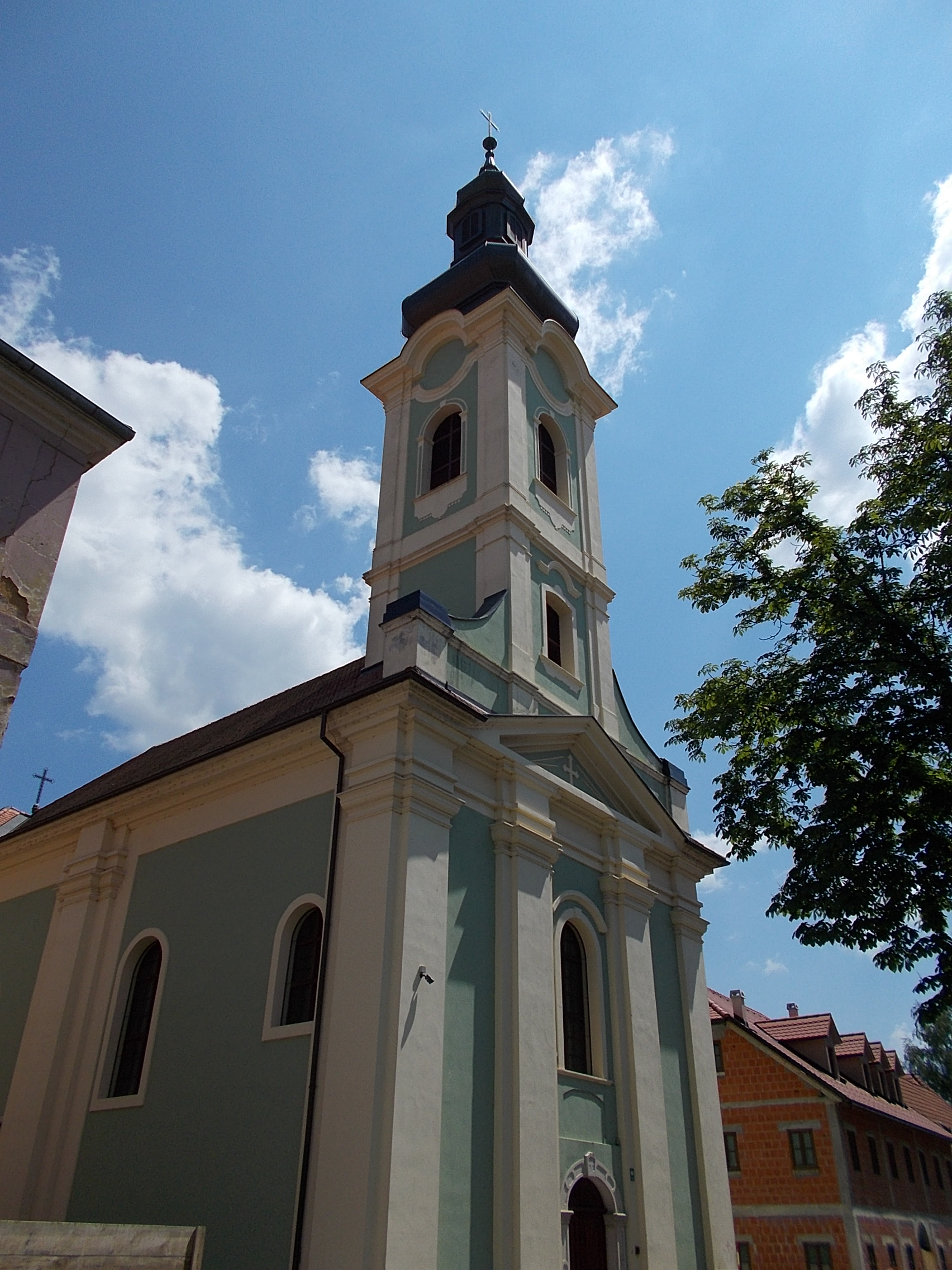
Saint Nicholas Cathedral, Karlovac

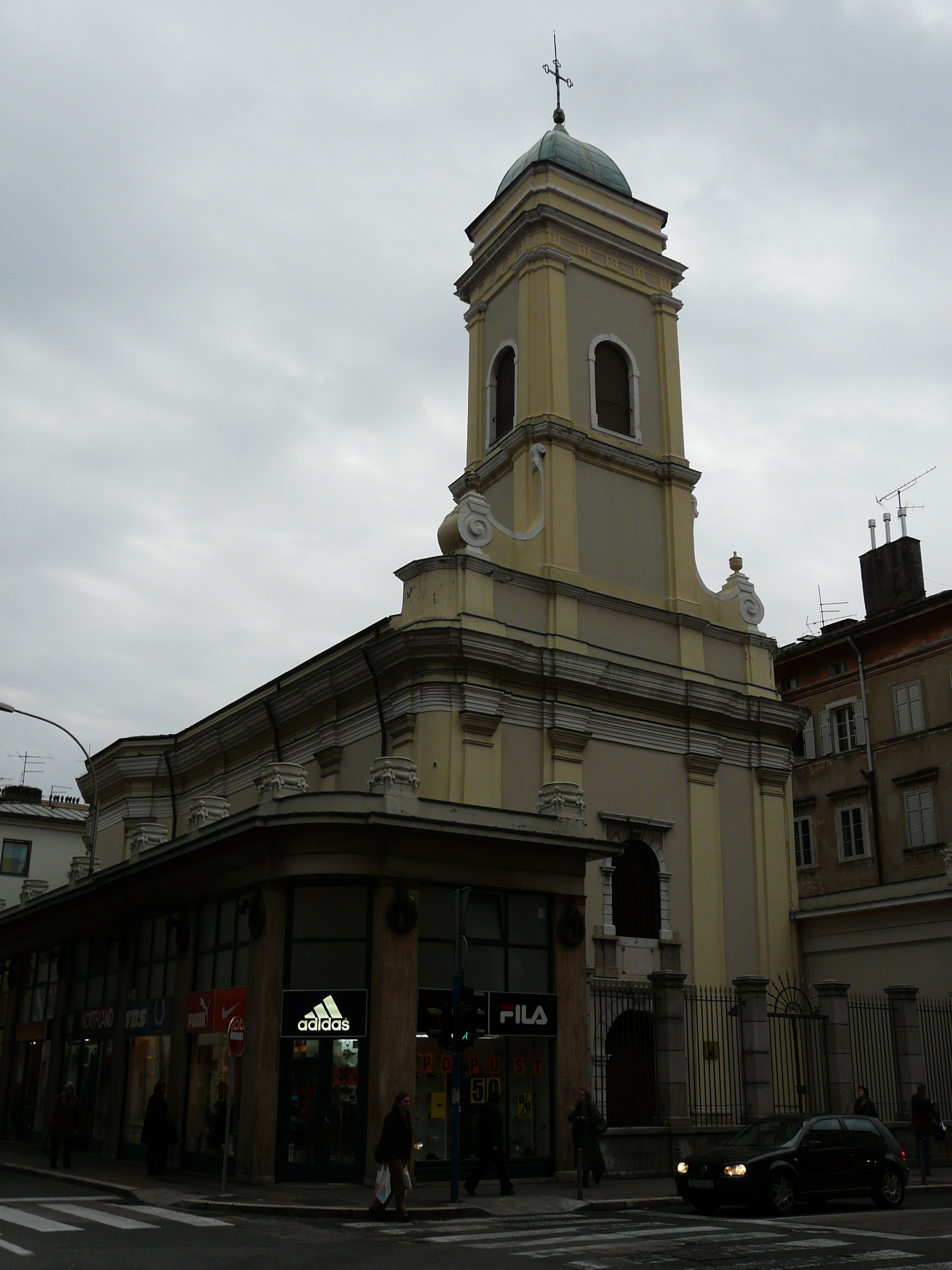
Church of St. Nicholas, Rijeka

== Eparchy of Osijek Plain and Baranya ==
- Saint Demetrius Cathedral, Dalj
- Church of the Saint Archangel Michael, Beli Manastir
- Church of the Transfer of the relics of the Holy Father Nicholas, Bijelo Brdo
- Church of the Dormition of the Theotokos, Bijelo Brdo
- Church of St. George, Bobota
- Church of Sts. Peter and Paul, Bolman
- Church of St. Stephen, Borovo
- Church of St. Stefan Dečanski, Borovo Naselje
- Church of the Transfer of the relics of the Holy Father Nicholas, Branjina
- Church of the Saint Archangel Gabriel, Bršadin
- Church of the Transfiguration of the Lord, Budimci
- Church of the Presentation of the Theotokos, Čakovci
- Church of the Saint Archangel Michael, Darda
- Church of the Saint Archangel Gabriel, Erdut
- Church of the Nativity of the Theotokos, Gaboš
- Church of St. Nicholas, Jagodnjak
- Church of St. Stefan Štiljanović, Karanac
- Church of the Presentation of Mary, Kneževi Vinogradi
- Church of St. George, Kneževo
- Church of St. George, Marinci
- Church of Pentecost, Markušica
- Church of St. Nicholas, Mikluševci
- Church of St. Nicholas, Mirkovci
- Church of St. Panteleimon, Mirkovci
- Church of the Transfiguration of the Lord, Mohovo
- Church of the Dormition of the Theotokos, Negoslavci
- Church of St. Elijah, Novi Jankovci
- Church of St. George, Opatovac
- Church of Sts. Peter and Paul, Orolik
- Church of the Dormition of the Theotokos, Osijek
- Church of the Nativity of St. John the Baptist, Ostrovo
- Church of the Nativity of the Theotokos, Petrova Slatina
- Church of the Transfiguration of the Lord, Petrovci
- Church of the Presentation of the Theotokos, Popovac
- Church of St. Procopius, Rajevo Selo
- Church of St. Elijah, Silaš
- Church of St. Nicholas, Sotin
- Church of the Nativity of the Theotokos, Srijemske Laze
- Church of the Transfiguration of the Lord, Šarengrad
- Church of St. Nicholas, Tenja
- Church of the Transfiguration of the Lord, Trpinja
- Church of the Nativity of the Theotokos, Vera
- Church of Pentecost, Vinkovci
- Church of Sts. Peter and Paul, Vladislavci
- Church of St. Nicholas, Vukovar
- Church of St. Petka, Vukovar
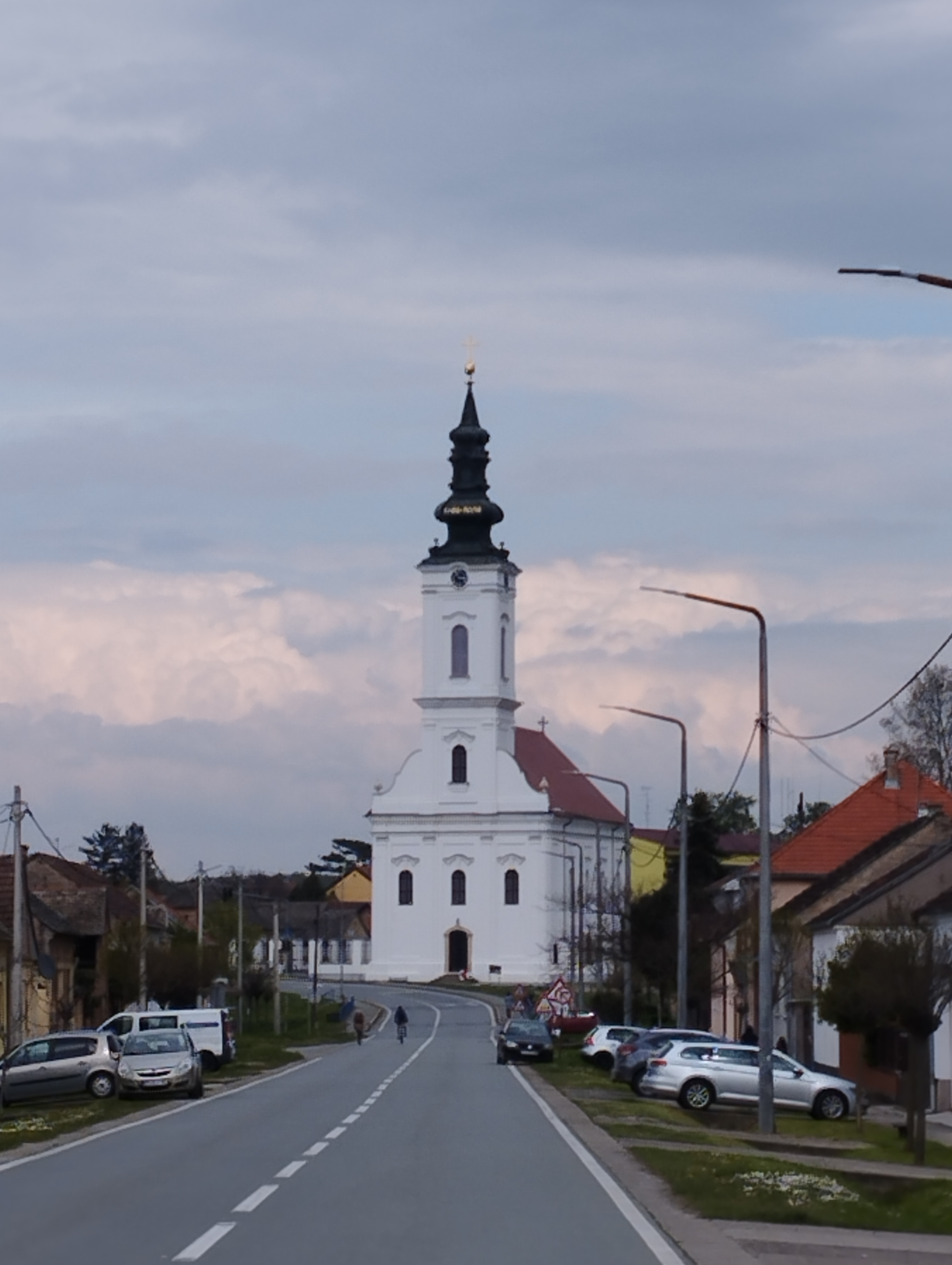
Saint Demetrius Cathedral, Dalj

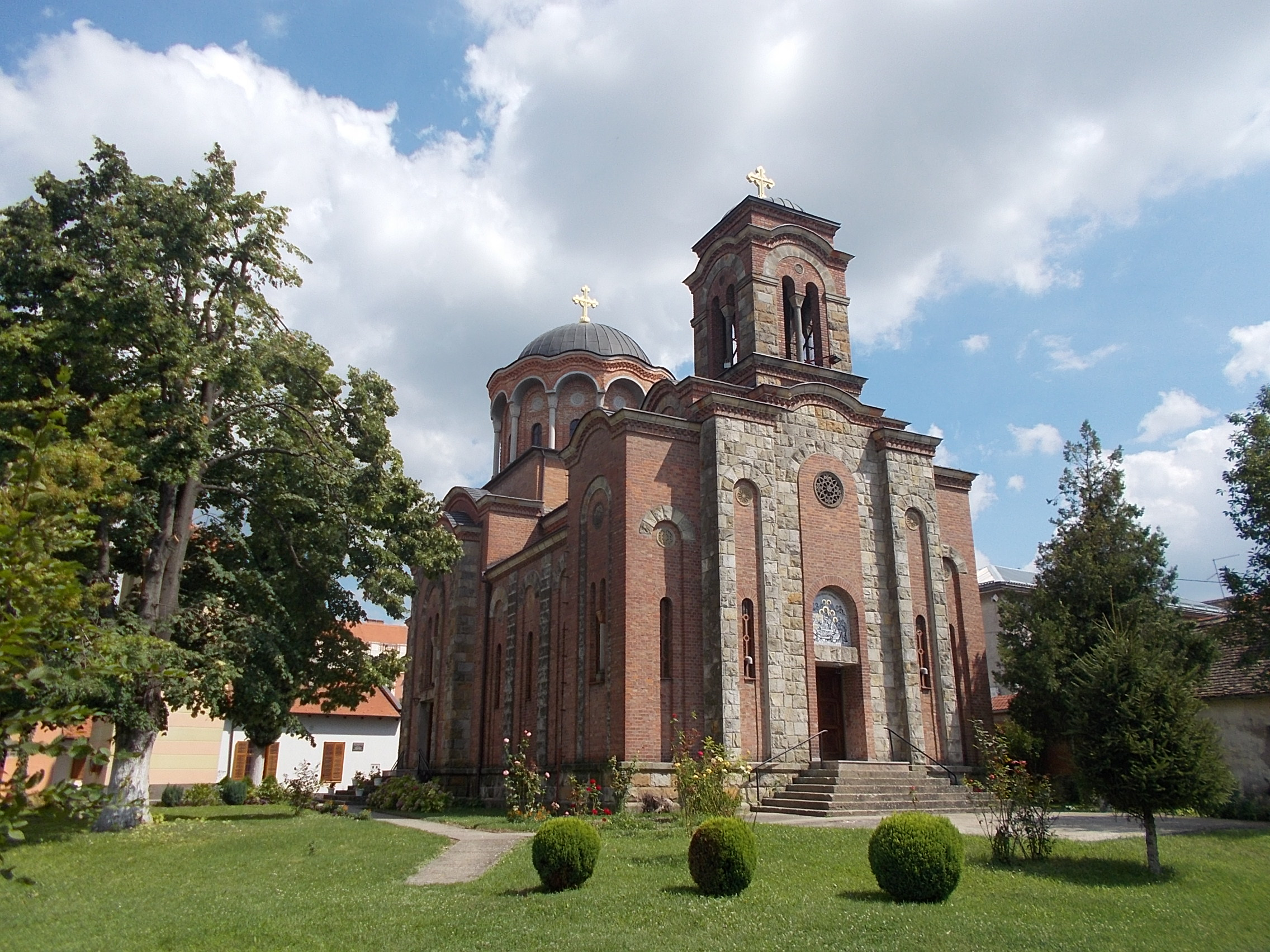
Church of the Dormition of the Theotokos, Osijek

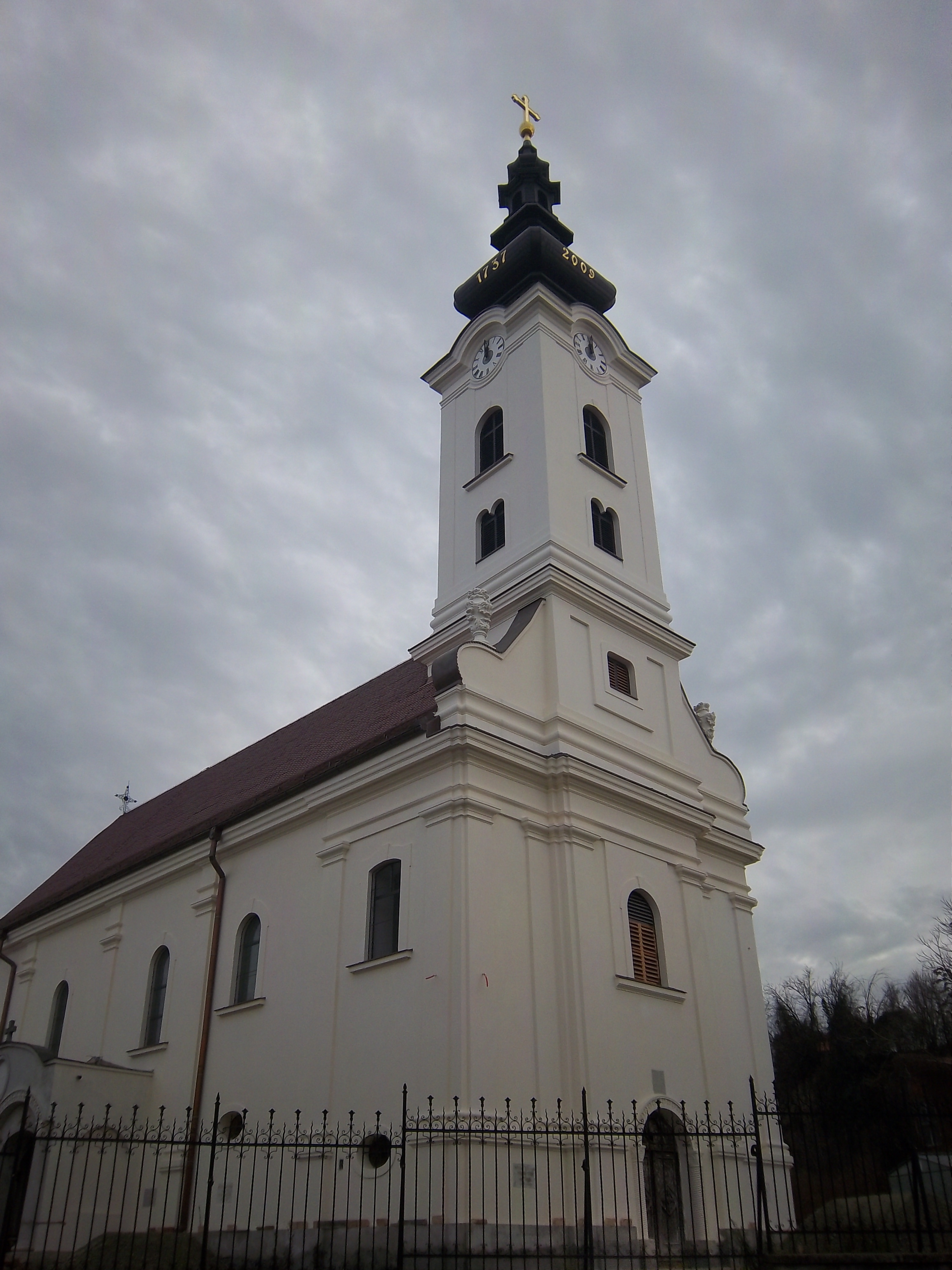
Church of St. Nicholas, Vukovar

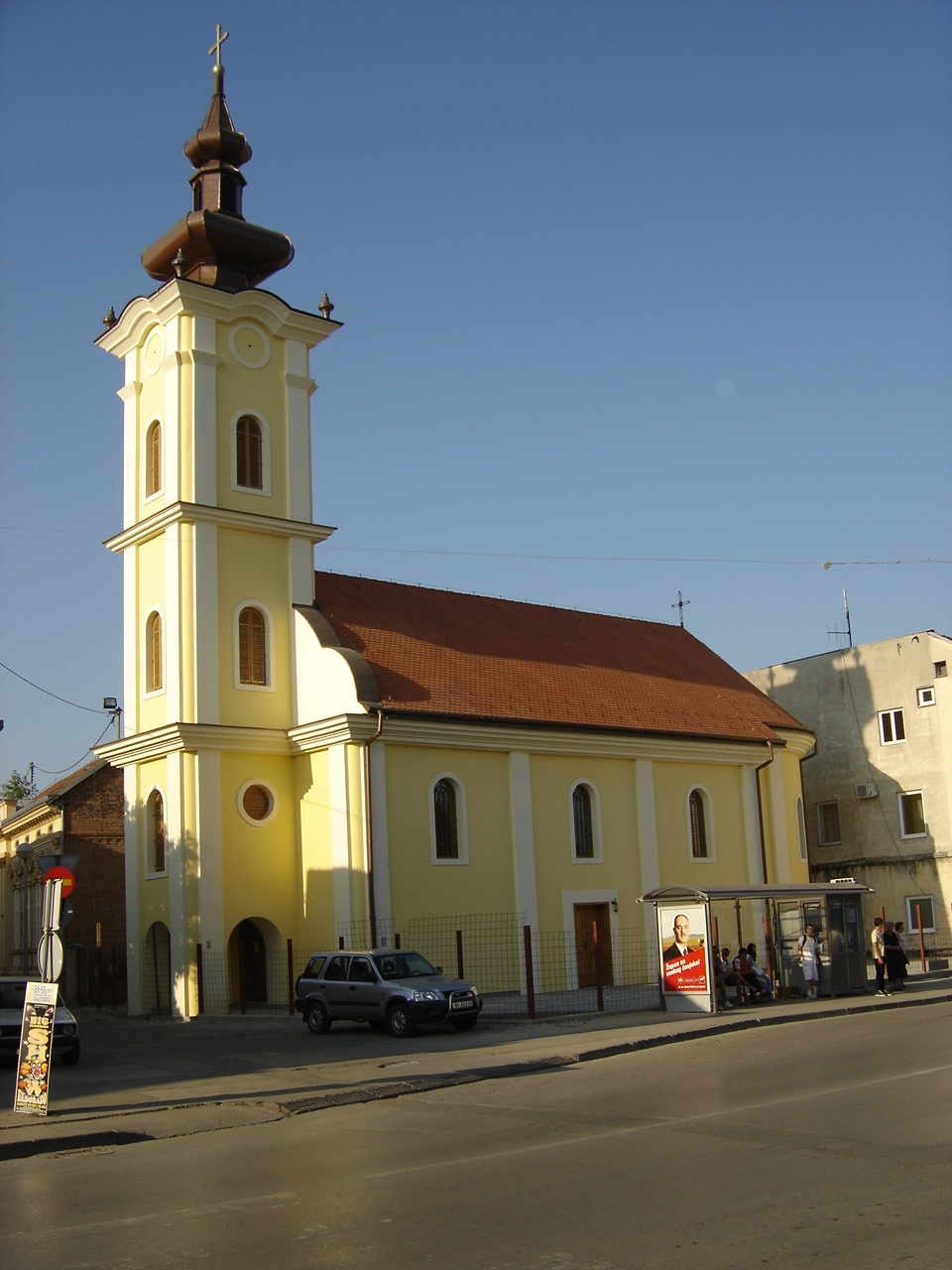
Church of Pentecost, Vinkovci

== Eparchy of Slavonia ==
- Holy Trinity Cathedral, Pakrac
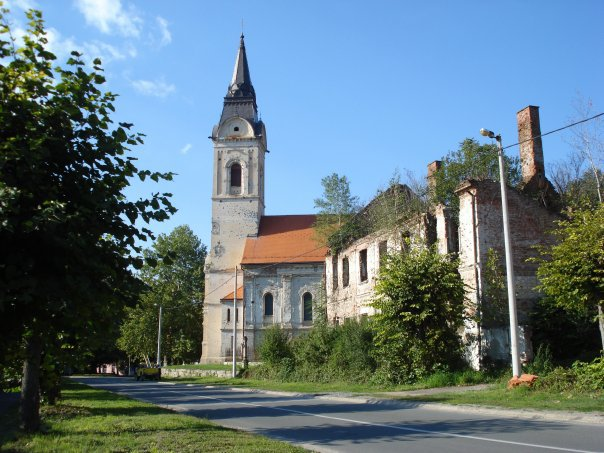
Holy Trinity Cathedral, Pakrac

== Eparchy of Srem ==
- Church of the Saint Archangel Michael, Ilok
- Church of St. George, Tovarnik
- Church of the Holy Venerable Mother Parascheva, Banovci
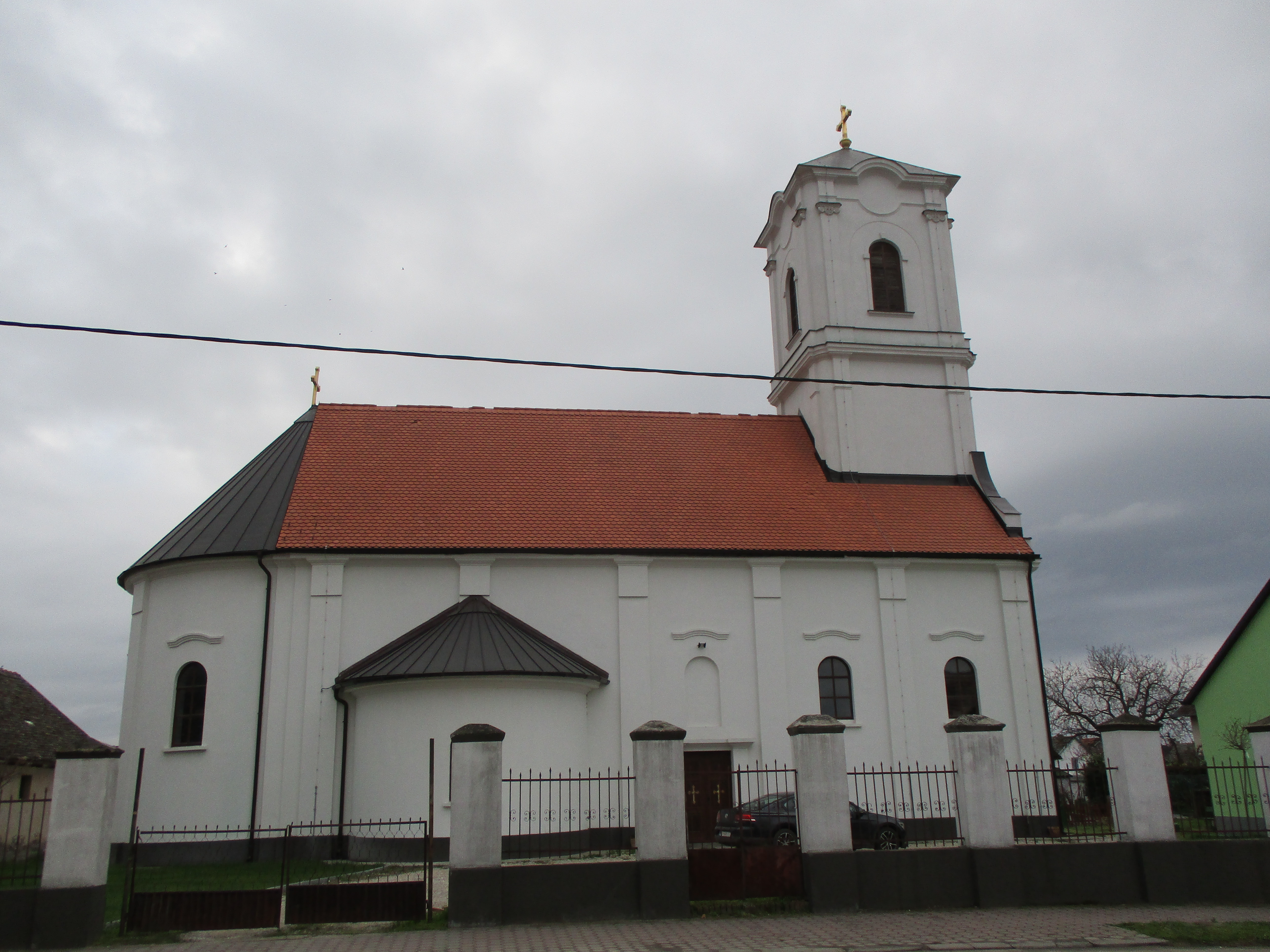
Church of the Saint Archangel Michael, Ilok

== Eparchy of Zachlumia, Herzegovina, and the Littoral ==
- Church of the Holy Annunciation, Dubrovnik
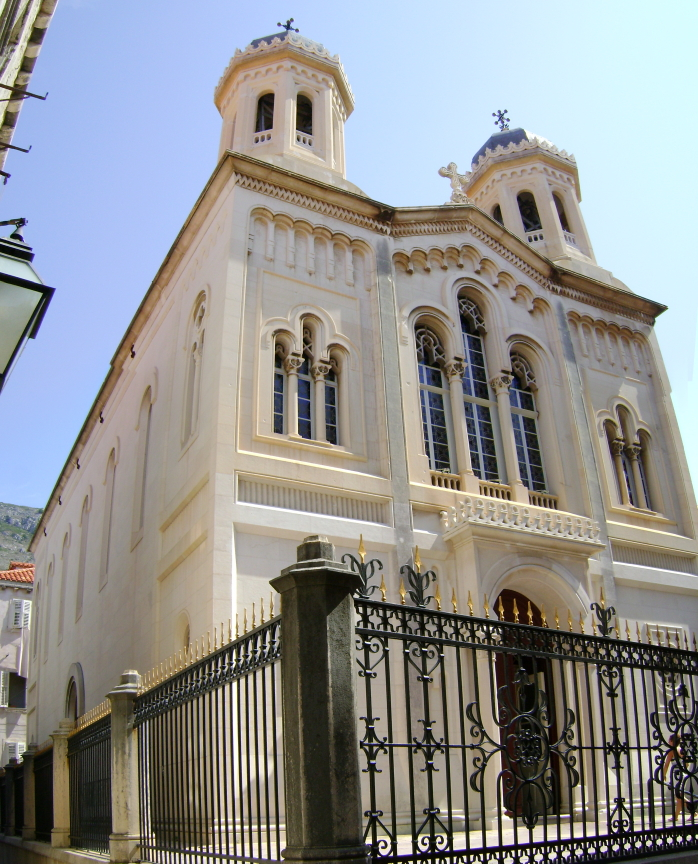
Church of the Holy Annunciation, Dubrovnik

== See also ==
- Eastern Orthodoxy in Croatia
- List of eparchies of the Serbian Orthodox Church
- Serbs of Croatia
