= Eastern Orthodoxy in Croatia =

Presence of Eastern Orthodox Christianity in Croatia

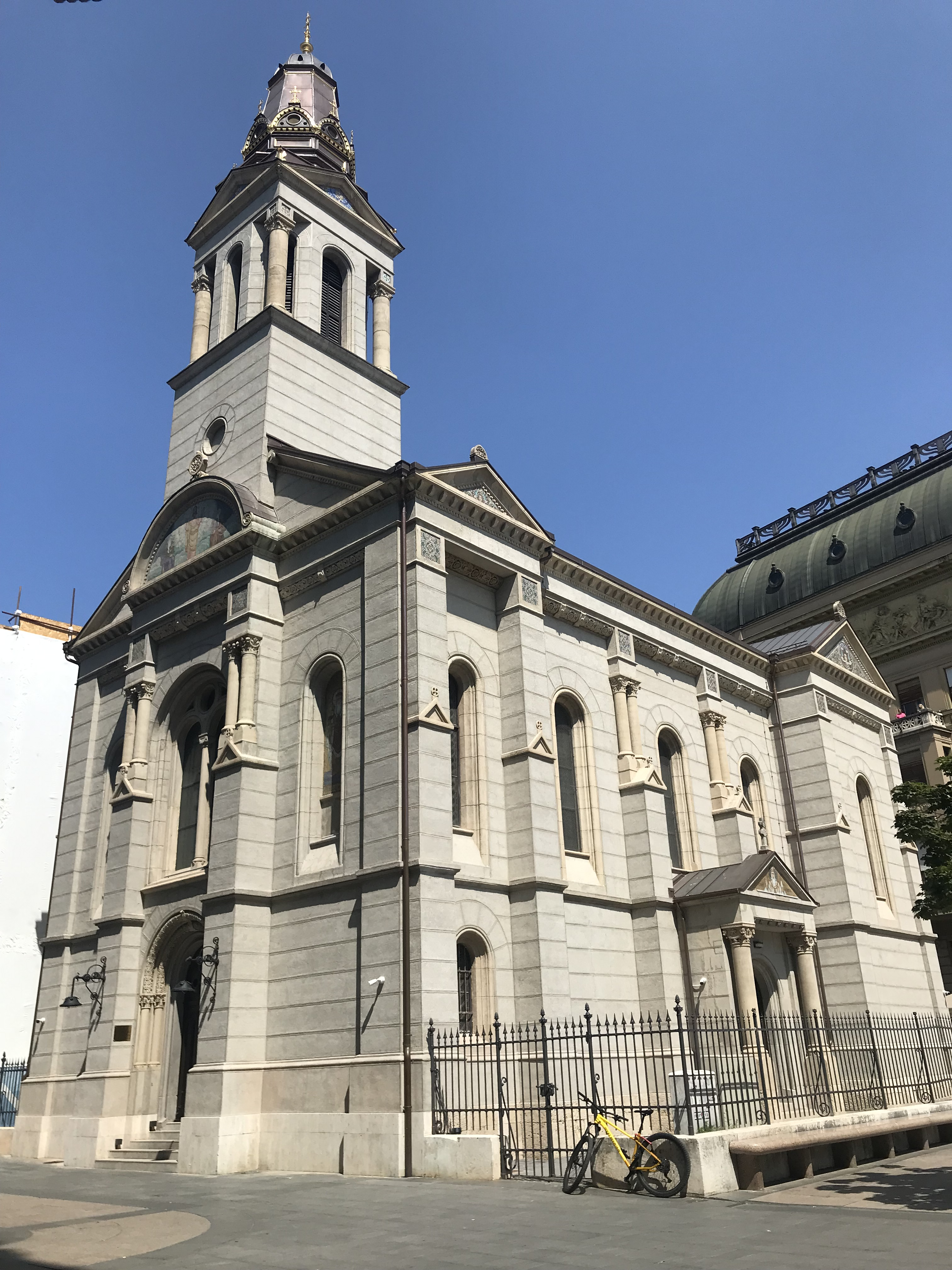
Cathedral of the Transfiguration of the Lord in Zagreb

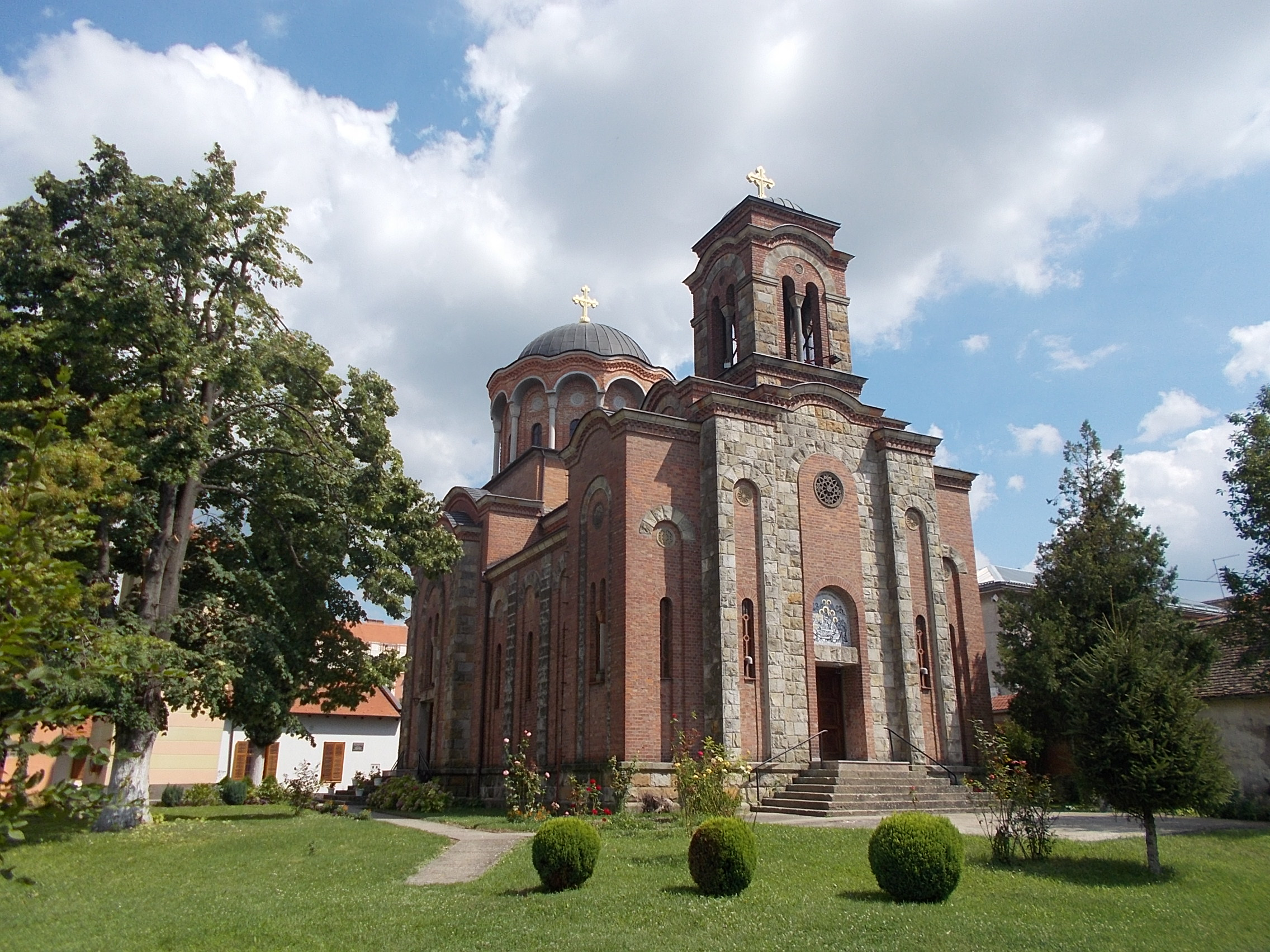
Church of the Dormition of the Theotokos in Osijek

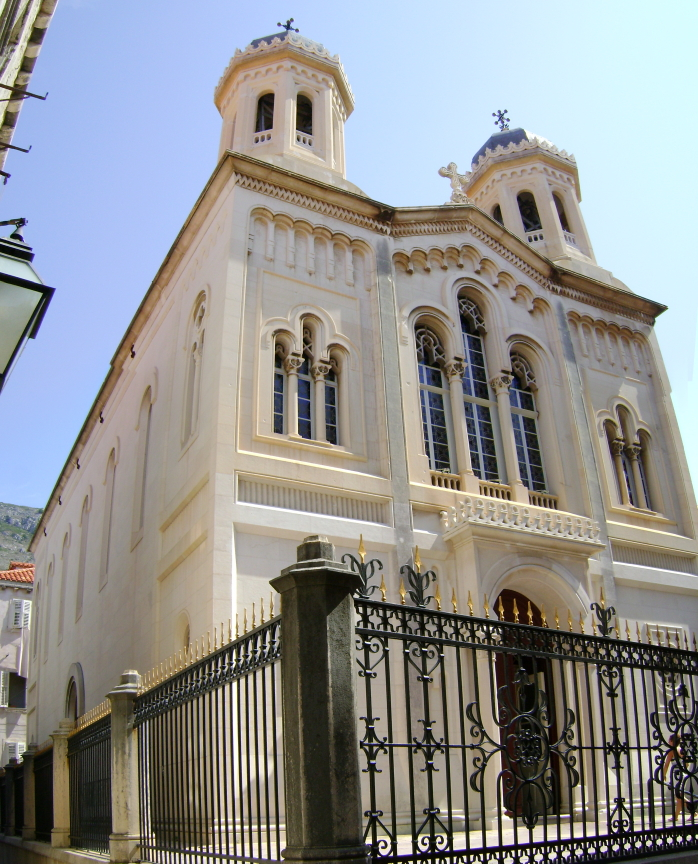
Church of the Holy Annunciation in Dubrovnik

The Eastern Orthodoxy is the second-largest religious denomination in Croatia, behind the Catholic Church. According to the 2021 census, there were 128,395 adherents of Eastern Orthodoxy in Croatia, making up 3.3% of the population.

The Serbian Orthodox Church is the sole Eastern Orthodox canonical jurisdiction in the territory of Croatia, although Bulgarian Orthodox Church and Macedonian Orthodox Church are also recognized by the state. During the World War II Nazi puppet Independent State of Croatia promoted the Croatian Orthodox Church, canonically unrecognized religious body, established as a part the genocide of Serbs policies in that state.

== Demographics ==
The published data from the 2021 Croatian census included a crosstab of ethnicity and religion, which showed that Eastern Orthodox believers were divided between the following ethnic groups:

- 101,250 Serbs (78.8%)
- 15,980 Croats (12.4%)
- 2,406 Romani (1.8%)
- 1,266 Macedonians (1.4%)
- 7,493 others, undeclared or unknown (5.8%)

== Serbian Orthodox Church in Croatia ==
The Serbian Orthodox Church, to which the overwhelming majority of Eastern Orthodox Christians in the country adhere, exercise its jurisdiction in the territory of Croatia through the following dioceses:

- Metropolitanate of Zagreb and Ljubljana; seat in Zagreb and the episcopal see at the Cathedral of the Transfiguration of the Lord.
- Eparchy of Osijek Plain and Baranya; seat in Dalj and the episcopal see at the Saint Demetrius Cathedral.
- Eparchy of Gornji Karlovac; seat in Karlovac and the episcopal see at the Saint Nicholas Cathedral.
- Eparchy of Slavonia; seat at Jasenovac Monastery and the episcopal see at the Holy Trinity Cathedral in Pakrac.
- Eparchy of Dalmatia; seat at Krka Monastery and the episcopal see at the Cathedral of the Dormition of the Theotokos in Šibenik.
- Eparchy of Zachlumia, Herzegovina, and the Littoral; partially covering Dalmatia, corresponding to Dubrovnik-Neretva County.
- Eparchy of Srem; partially covering Syrmia, corresponding to municipalities of Ilok, Tovarnik, and Nijemci.

There are over 600 Serbian Orthodox churches and other religious buildings in Croatia. During the Croatian War of Independence, 84 of these churches were damaged or destroyed. Of that number, 21 were completely demolished by explosives, 4 wooden churches were burned, 56 masonry churches were damaged or burned during and after the war and 3 churches were removed during or shortly after the conflict. By 2025, 42 of the 84 affected buildings had been reconstructed or rebuilt.

== See also ==
- Religion in Croatia

== Sources ==
- Bataković, Dušan T., ed. (2005). Histoire du peuple serbe [History of the Serbian People] (in French). Lausanne: L’Age d’Homme.
- Ćirković, Sima (2004). The Serbs. Malden: Blackwell Publishing.
- Krestić, Vasilije (1997). History of the Serbs in Croatia and Slavonia 1848-1914. Belgrade: BIGZ.
- Mileusnić, Slobodan (1997). Spiritual Genocide: A survey of destroyed, damaged and desecrated churches, monasteries and other church buildings during the war 1991-1995 (1997). Belgrade: Museum of the Serbian Orthodox Church.
- Miller, Nicholas J. (1997). Between Nation and State: Serbian Politics in Croatia Before the First World War. Pittsburgh: University of Pittsburgh Press.
- Raković, Aleksandar (2013). "Short Existence of the Faculty of Eastern Orthodox Theology at the University of Zagreb 1920-1924" (PDF). Теолошки погледи. 46 (3): 951–956. Archived from the original (PDF) on 2019-10-07.
