= Eparchy of Osijek Plain and Baranya =

Diocese of the Serbian Orthodox Church

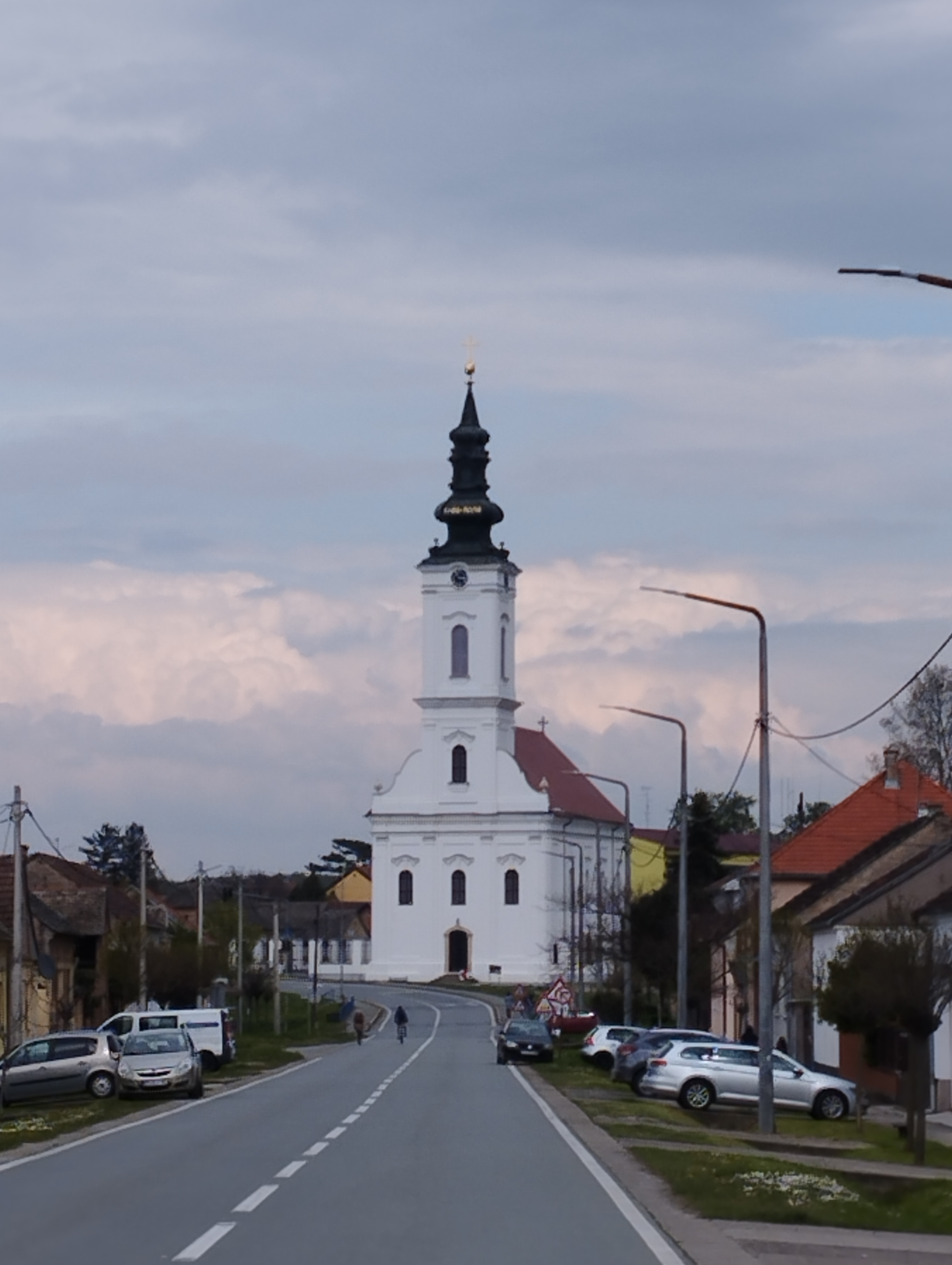
- Saint Demetrius Cathedral, Dalj

Location
- Territory: eastern Croatia
- Headquarters: Dalj, Croatia

Information
- Denomination: Eastern Orthodox
- Sui iuris church: Serbian Orthodox Church
- Established: 1991
- Cathedral: Saint Demetrius Cathedral, Dalj
- Language: Church Slavonic, Serbian

Current leadership
- Bishop: Heruvim Đermanović

Map

Website
- Eparchy of Osijek Plain and Baranya

The Eparchy of Osijek Plain and Baranya (Serbian: Епархија осјечкопољска и барањска; Croatian: Eparhija osječkopoljska i baranjska) is a diocese (eparchy) of the Serbian Orthodox Church, covering eastern part of Slavonia and Croatian part of Baranya, in eastern Croatia.

The episcopal see is located at the Saint Demetrius Cathedral, Dalj. Its headquarters and bishop's residence are also in Dalj.

== History ==
During the period of Ottoman rule (16th and 17th centuries), Eastern Orthodox Christians in the region were under ecclesiastical jurisdiction of the Serbian Patriarchate of Peć, with local eparchies on both sides of the river Drava, including Baranya to the north and Osijek Plain to the south. The term "Osijek Plain" (Osječko polje) is an archaic name, created in the first years of the 18th century, designating the area that included the entire vicinity of the city of Osijek and the region between the lower course of the Drava and Danube rivers, up to the river Vuka.

During the Great Migration of the Serbs, those regions were also inhabited by new Serb settlers, who were also included in collective privileges granted by Habsburg rulers to their Eastern Orthodox population.

Since the Osijek Plain lies at the intersection of Syrmia, Baranya, and Slavonia, it was at various times attached to one or another of the three neighboring eparchies, and at other times maintained its own bishop. In 1710, at the Church Council at Krušedol Monastery, Nicanor Melentijević was elected bishop for the eparchy that was encompassing the entire Baranya, and also the Osijek Plain.

In 1733, the eparchy was divided, with northern part (Baranya) being attached to the Eparchy of Buda, while Osijek Plain was incorporated into the Eparchy of Srem. Patriarch Arsenije IV Jovanović Šakabenta assigned the Eparchy of Osijek Plain in 1746 to Bishop Jovan Georgijević. The residence of Bishop Jovan was in Osijek, where Eparchy then had two houses. In 1748, it was once again united with the Eparchy of Slavonia. From 1758 until 1991, the eparchy remained firmly within the jurisdiction of the Eparchy of Srem. In 1991, by the decision of the Holy Assembly of the Serbian Orthodox Church, present eparchy was established in 1991.

== List of bishops ==
- Lukijan Vladulov (1991–2017)
- Irinej Bulović (administrator) (2017–2018)
- Heruvim Đermanović (2018–present)

== Notable churches ==
- Church of St. George, Bobota
- Church of Sts. Peter and Paul, Bolman
- Church of St. Stephen, Borovo
- Church of the Presentation of the Theotokos, Čakovci
- Church of the Saint Archangel Michael, Darda
- Church of the Nativity of the Theotokos, Gaboš
- Church of St. Nicholas, Jagodnjak
- Church of St. Stefan Štiljanović, Karanac
- Church of St. George, Kneževo
- Church of Pentecost, Markušica
- Church of St. Nicholas, Mikluševci
- Church of St. Nicholas, Mirkovci
- Church of St. Panteleimon, Mirkovci
- Church of the Transfiguration of the Lord, Mohovo
- Church of the Dormition of the Theotokos, Negoslavci
- Church of St. Elijah, Novi Jankovci
- Church of St. George, Opatovac
- Church of Sts. Peter and Paul, Orolik
- Church of the Dormition of the Theotokos, Osijek
- Church of the Nativity of Saint John the Baptist, Ostrovo
- Church of the Presentation of the Theotokos, Popovac
- Church of the Nativity of the Theotokos, Srijemske Laze
- Church of the Transfiguration of the Lord, Šarengrad
- Church of the Transfiguration of the Lord, Trpinja
- Church of Pentecost, Vinkovci
- Church of St. Nicholas, Vukovar

== Gallery ==
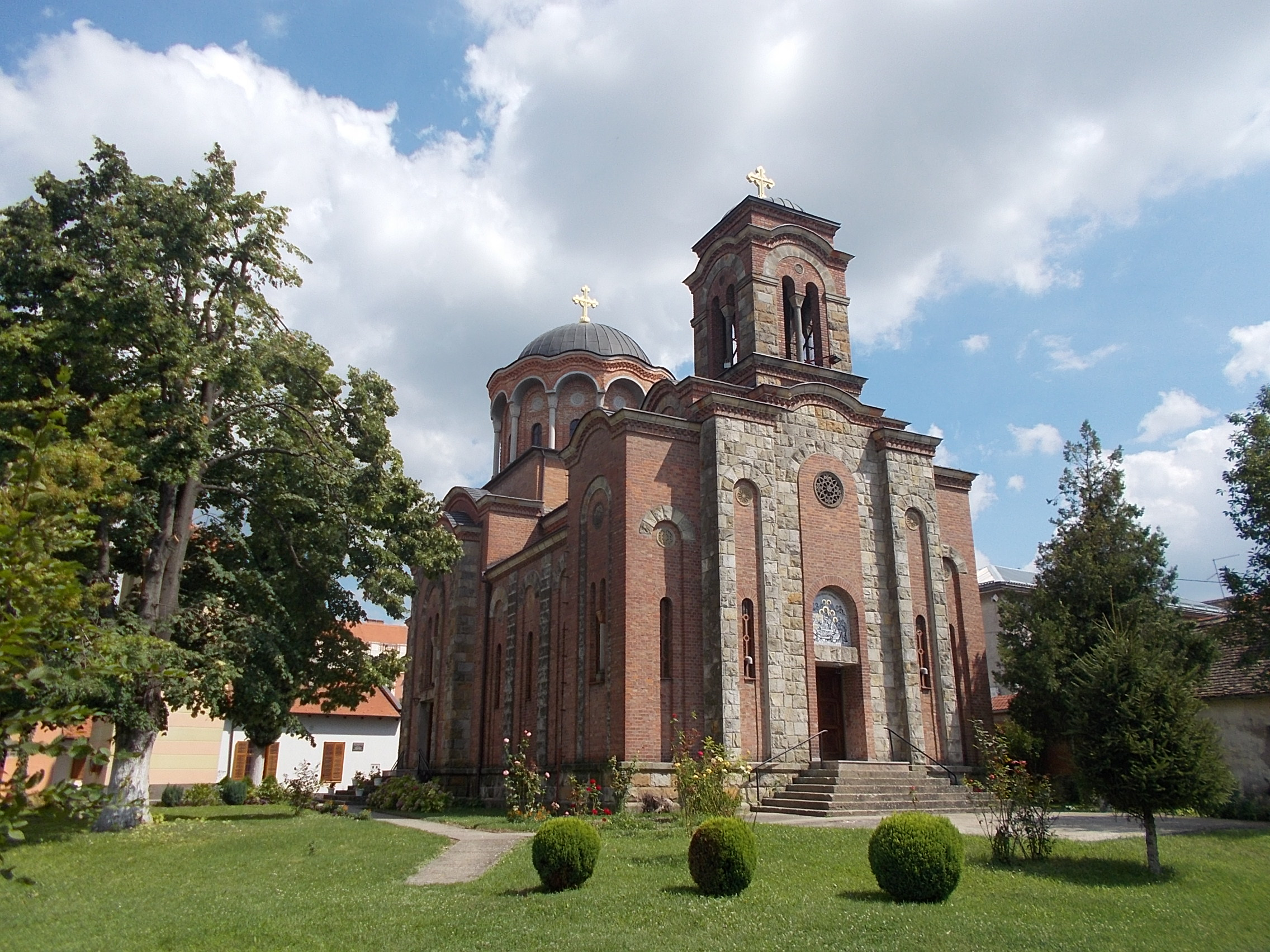
Church of the Dormition of the Theotokos, Osijek

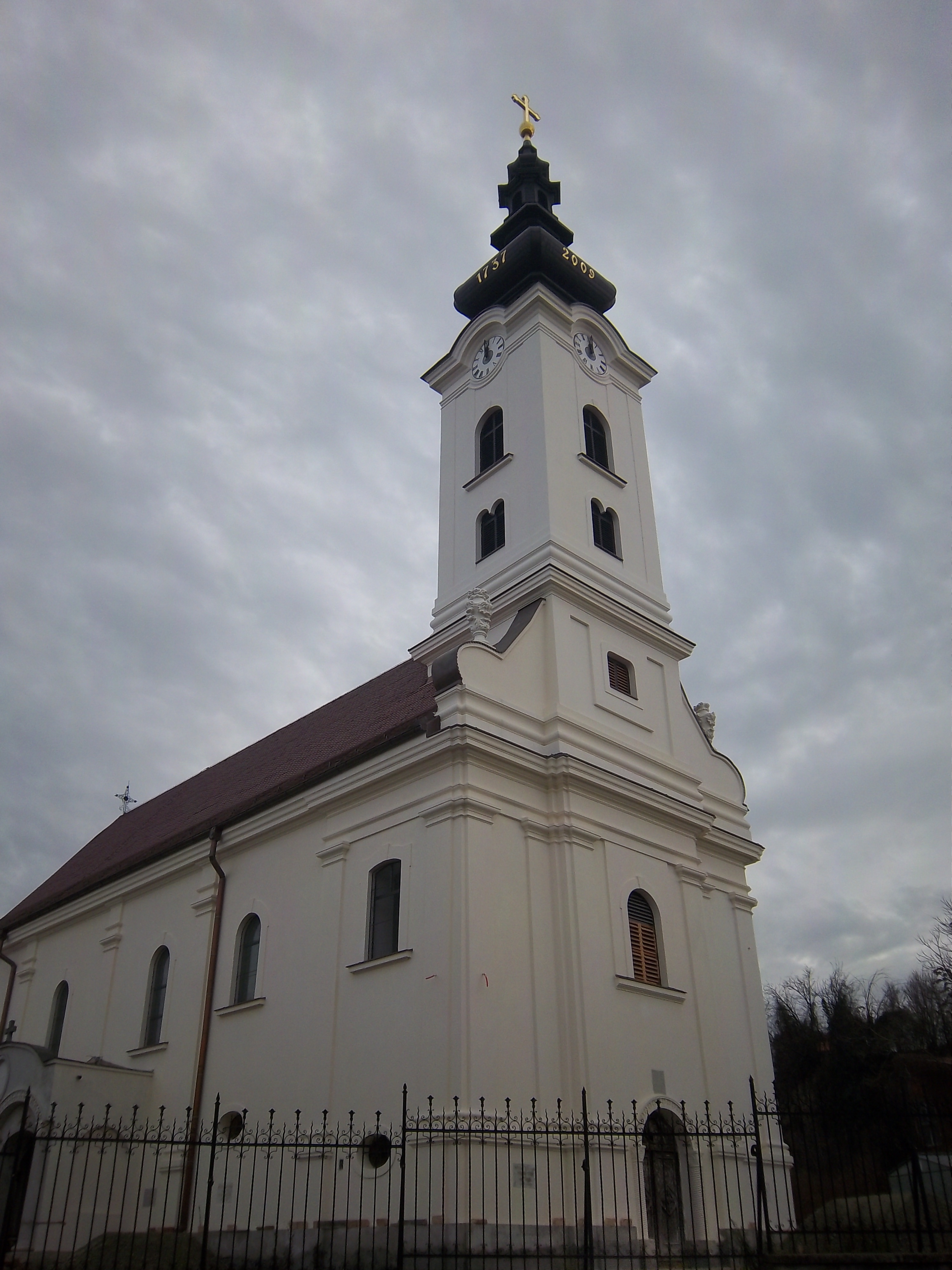
Church of St. Nicholas, Vukovar

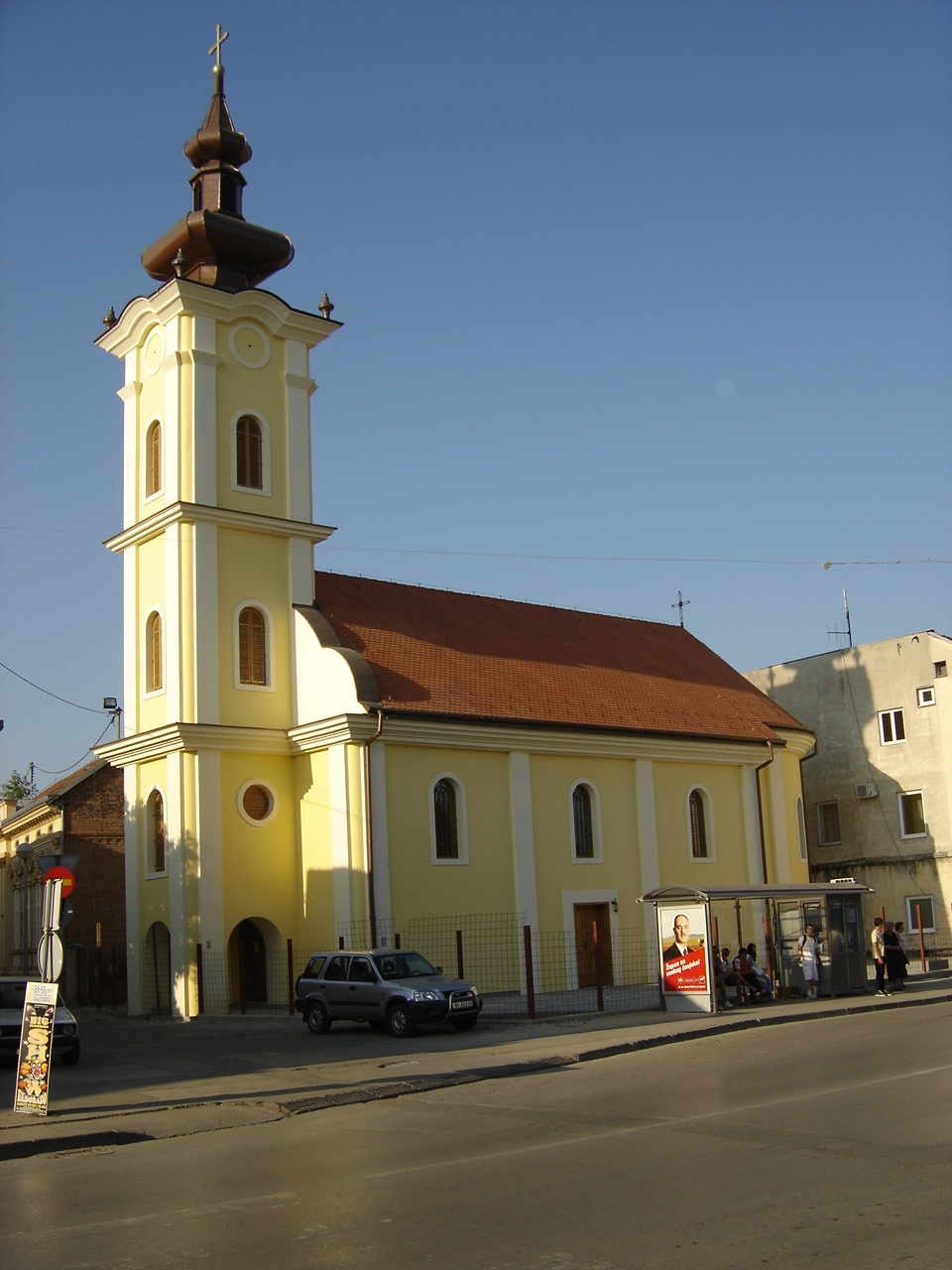
Church of Pentecost, Vinkovci

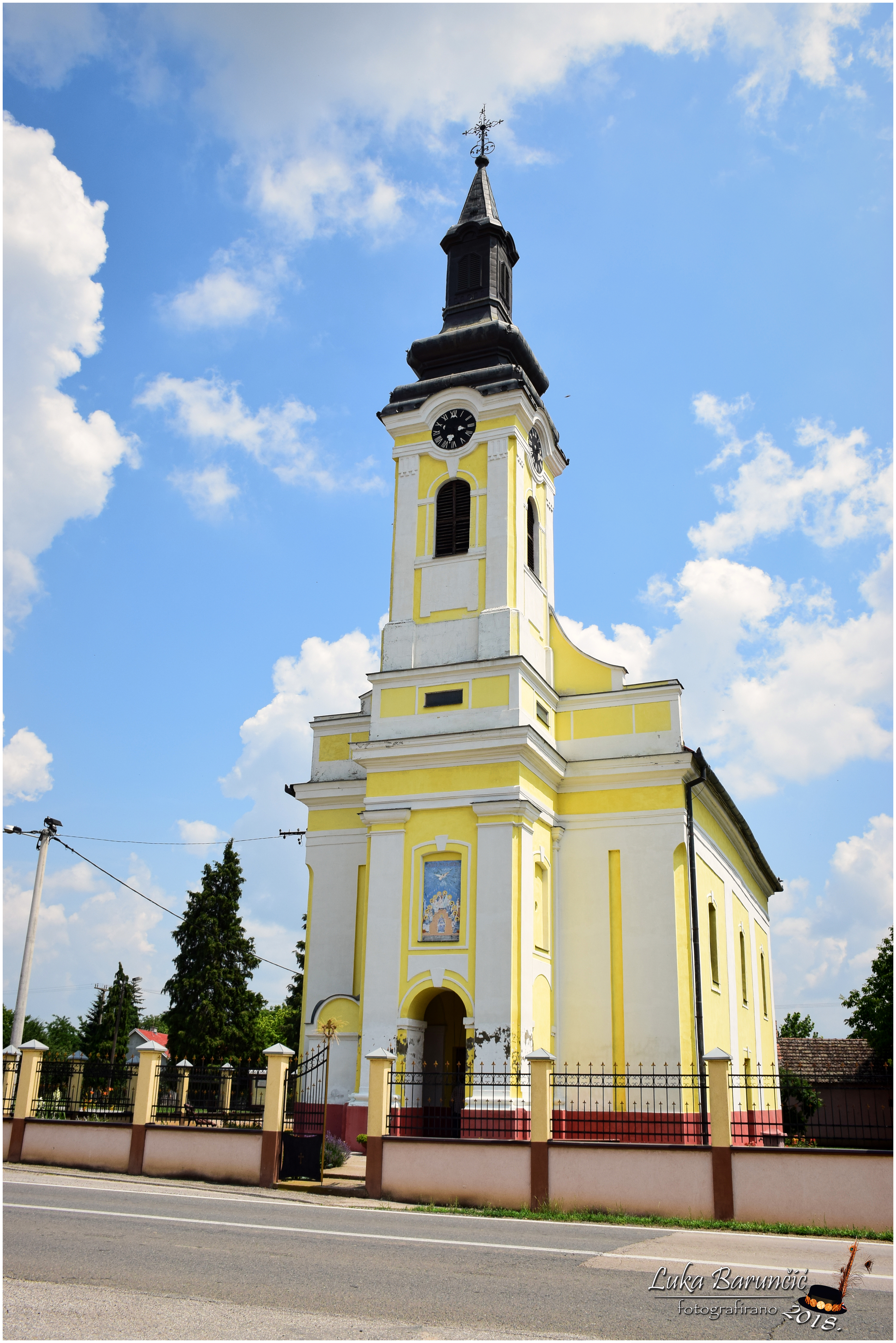
Church of Pentecost, Markušica

== See also ==
- Eastern Orthodoxy in Croatia
- Eparchies and metropolitanates of the Serbian Orthodox Church
- Lordship of Dalj
- Serbs of Vukovar
- Serbs of Croatia

== Sources ==
- Bataković, Dušan T., ed. (2005). Histoire du peuple serbe [History of the Serbian People] (in French). Lausanne: L’Age d’Homme. ISBN 978-2-8251-1958-7.
- Ćirković, Sima (2004). The Serbs. Malden: Blackwell Publishing. ISBN 9781405142915.
- Gavrilović, Slavko (1993). "Serbs in Hungary, Slavonia and Croatia in struggles against the Turks (15th–18th centuries)". Serbs in European Civilization. Belgrade: Nova, Serbian Academy of Sciences and Arts, Institute for Balkan Studies. pp. 41–54. ISBN 978-86-7583-015-3.
- Mileusnić, Slobodan (1997). Spiritual Genocide: A survey of destroyed, damaged and desecrated churches, monasteries and other church buildings during the war 1991–1995 (1997). Belgrade: Museum of the Serbian Orthodox Church.
- Molnár, Antal (2019). "Szerb ortodox egyházszervezet a hódolt Magyarországon". Szerb székesegyház a Tabánban: Az eltűnt Rácváros emlékezete. Budapest: Budapesti Történeti Múzeum. pp. 33–63.
- Sotirović, Vladislav B. (2011). "The Serbian Patriarchate of Peć in the Ottoman Empire: The First Phase (1557–94)" (PDF). Serbian Studies. 25 (2): 143–169. Archived from the original (PDF) on 10 August 2016.
- Točanac-Radović, Isidora (2018). "Belgrade - Seat of the Archbishopric and Metropolitanate (1718–1739)". Belgrade 1521-1867. Belgrade: The Institute of History. pp. 155–167. ISBN 978-86-7743-132-7.
- Točanac-Radović, Isidora (2022). "The Great Migration of Serbs and the Question of the Serbian Ethnic and Religious Community in the Habsburg Monarchy". Migrations in the Slavic Cultural Space: From the Middle Ages to the Present Day. Łódź: Łódź University Press. pp. 15–27. ISBN 978-83-8331-033-6.
