= Church of the Presentation of the Theotokos, Čakovci =

Serbian Orthodox church in Čakovci, Croatia

Church of the Presentation of the Theotokos
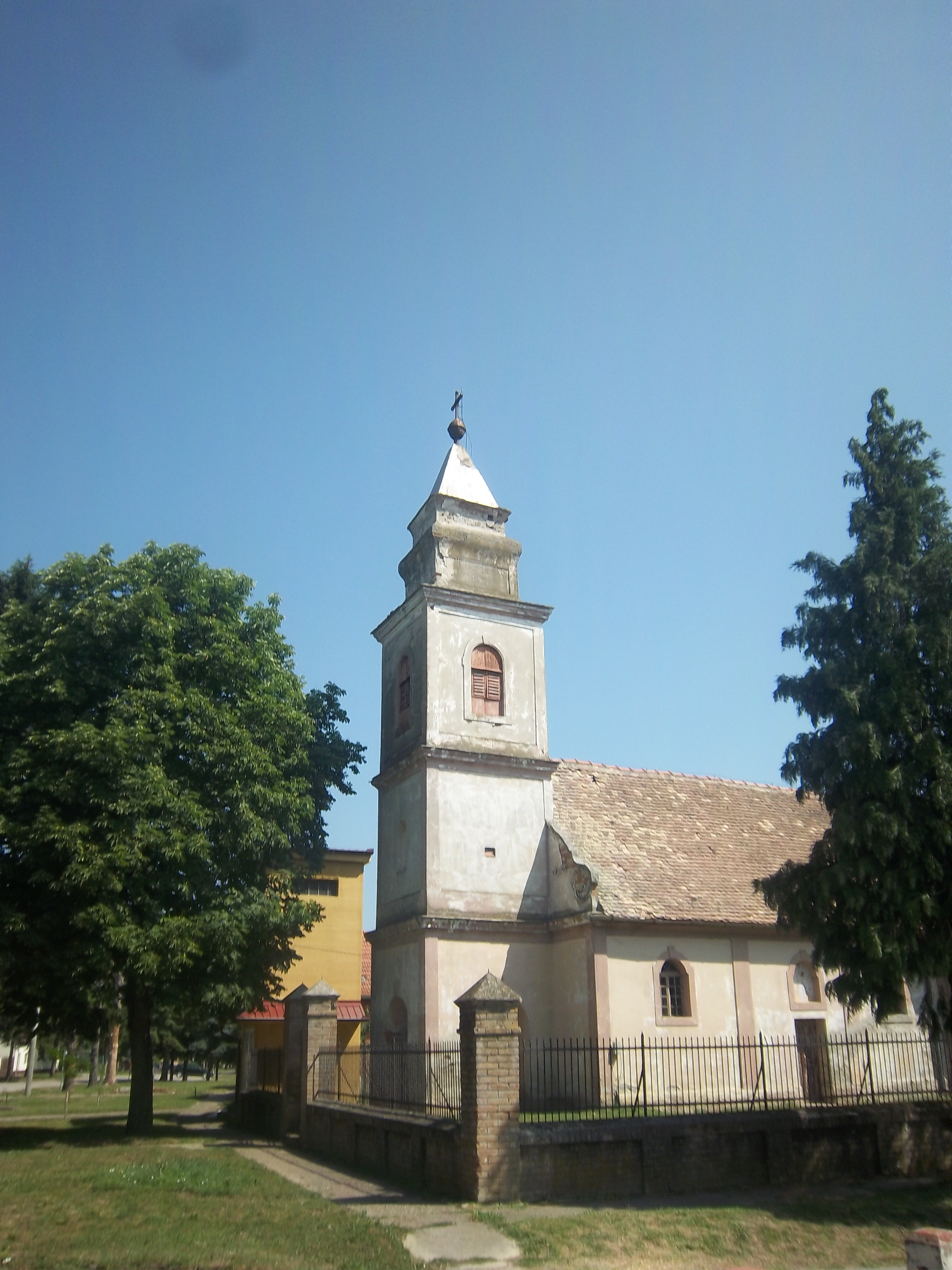
- Church of the Presentation of Theotokos
- Church of the Presentation of the Theotokos
- 45°14′10″N 19°03′31″E
- Country: Croatia
- Denomination: Serbian Orthodox

History
- Dedication: Presentation of Mary

Architecture
- Years built: 1762

Administration
- Archdiocese: Eparchy of Osijek Plain and Baranya

The Church of the Presentation of the Theotokos (Serbian: Црква Ваведења пресвете Богородице; Croatian: Crkva Vavedenja presvete Bogorodice) in Čakovci is a Serbian Orthodox church in eastern Croatia. The first wooden church at the spot of contemporary church was constructed in 1732. The current church was completed in 1762. Despite being protected and inscribed in the Register of Cultural Goods of the Republic of Croatia, as of 2014 the church was not reconstructed for over 100 years. The lack of preservation activities and municipal funding for the object was criticized by the local Serb minority representative from the Independent Democratic Serb Party.

The first organized Eastern Orthodox settlement of Čakovci occurred during the Great Migrations of the Serbs led by Arsenije III Crnojević. The historical sources imply that in the 18th century Eastern Orthodox population constituted the majority of the local population. In 1786 court cartographer Gabriel Homer marked Eastern Orthodox cemetery as being significantly larger than the Roman Catholic one. In 1847 Roman Catholic (mostly ethnic Hungarians) were again majority of the population while Eastern Orthodox constituted 195 out of 690 inhabitants. The church was inscribed into regional map in 1888 by Miloš Radeljević while for unknown reason he missed to inscribe the Roman Catholic church which was built in the village in 1828.

== See also ==
- List of Serbian Orthodox churches in Croatia
- Eparchy of Osijek Plain and Baranya
- Serbs of Croatia
