= Church of the Saint Archangel Michael, Darda =

Serbian Orthodox church in Darda, Croatia

Church of the Saint Archangel Michael
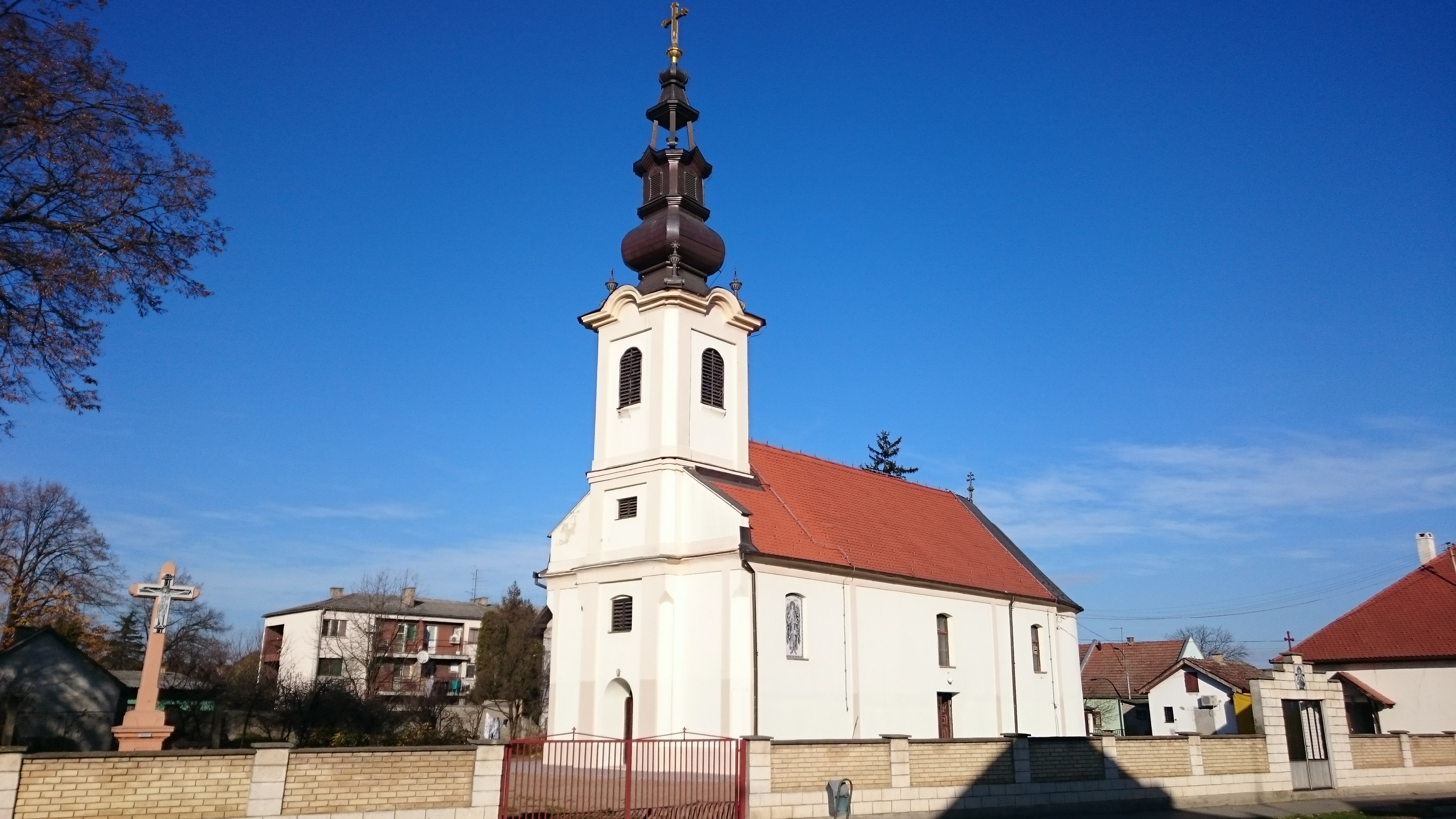
- Church of the Saint Archangel Michael
- Church of the Saint Archangel Michael
- 45.6252°N 18.6879°E
- Location: Darda, Osijek-Baranja County
- Country: Croatia
- Denomination: Serbian Orthodox

History
- Status: Church
- Dedication: Archangel Michael

Architecture
- Functional status: Active
- Style: Baroque
- Years built: 1777

Administration
- Archdiocese: Eparchy of Osijek Plain and Baranya

Church of the Saint Archangel Michael (Serbian Cyrillic: Црква светог Архангела Михаила, Croatian: Crkva svetog Arhangela Mihaila) in Darda is a Serbian Orthodox church in eastern Croatia. The first orthodox church at the site of contemporary church was constructed in 1726, while the current building was completed in 1777. The local Eastern Orthodox parish in Darda was formally established in 1742. The church is a single-nave building with a semicircular apse and a bell tower on the first floor. The bell tower is covered with a late baroque bulb with two lanterns. It was consecrated by the Bishop of the Eparchy of Buda Dionisije Popović in 1794. The three church bells, which cumulatively weighed 670 kilograms (1,480 lb), were made in Ljubljana in 1925.

== See also ==
- List of Serbian Orthodox churches in Croatia
- Eparchy of Osijek Plain and Baranya
- Serbs of Croatia
