= Church of the Dormition of the Theotokos, Osijek =

Serbian Orthodox church in Osijek, Croatia

Coordinates: 45.55931°N 18.71858°E

Church of the Dormition of the Theotokos
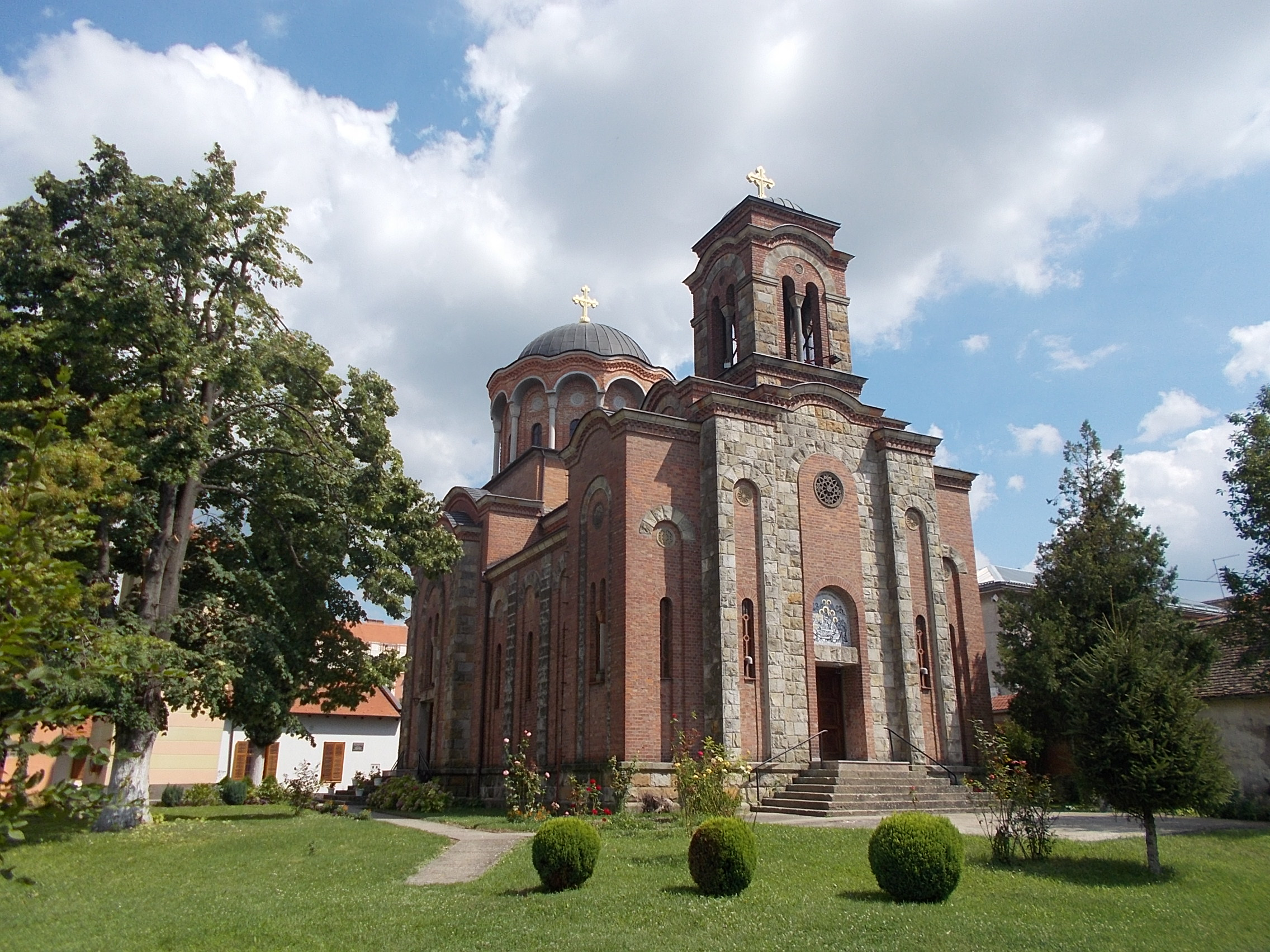
- Church of the Dormition of the Theotokos
- Location: Jova Jovanović Zmaj Street, Osijek
- Country: Croatia
- Denomination: Serbian Orthodox

History
- Dedication: Dormition of the Mother of God

Architecture
- Architect: Dragomir Tadić
- Style: Byzantine Revival (Serbo-Byzantine Revival)

Administration
- Archdiocese: Eparchy of Osijek Plain and Baranya

The Church of the Dormition of the Theotokos (Serbian: Црква успења пресвете Богородице; Croatian: Crkva uspenja presvete Bogorodice) is a Serbian Orthodox church located in Donji grad, Osijek in eastern Croatia. The modern day church was completed in 1979 at the site of an earlier Serbian Orthodox church which was destroyed by the Ustashe regime in 1942 during the World War II Genocide of Serbs in the Independent State of Croatia.

The new building was designed by Dragomir Tadić who was inspired by Serbo-Byzantine Revival style. Due to this architectural style, the building is commonly known as Slavonian Lazarica after famous medieval Lazarica Church in Kruševac, Serbia.

== History ==
The wooden Eastern Orthodox church in Osijek was constructed at the time of the Great Migrations of the Serbs. The new brick building dedicated to Paraskeva of the Balkans was erected at the same site in 1719. The main church of Transfiguration of the Lord at the site of contemporary church was completed in 1743 as an grandiose building modeled after the Church of Saint Demetrius in Budapest (itself destroyed in 1940's). As there was no goldsmith trained to build gilded dome of the church, some of the most prominent merchants in local Eastern Orthodox community collected 135 Gold ducat of Venice which were embedded into the dome to create the desired effect.

In 2020 the parish initiated construction of the new cultural center.

== Gallery ==
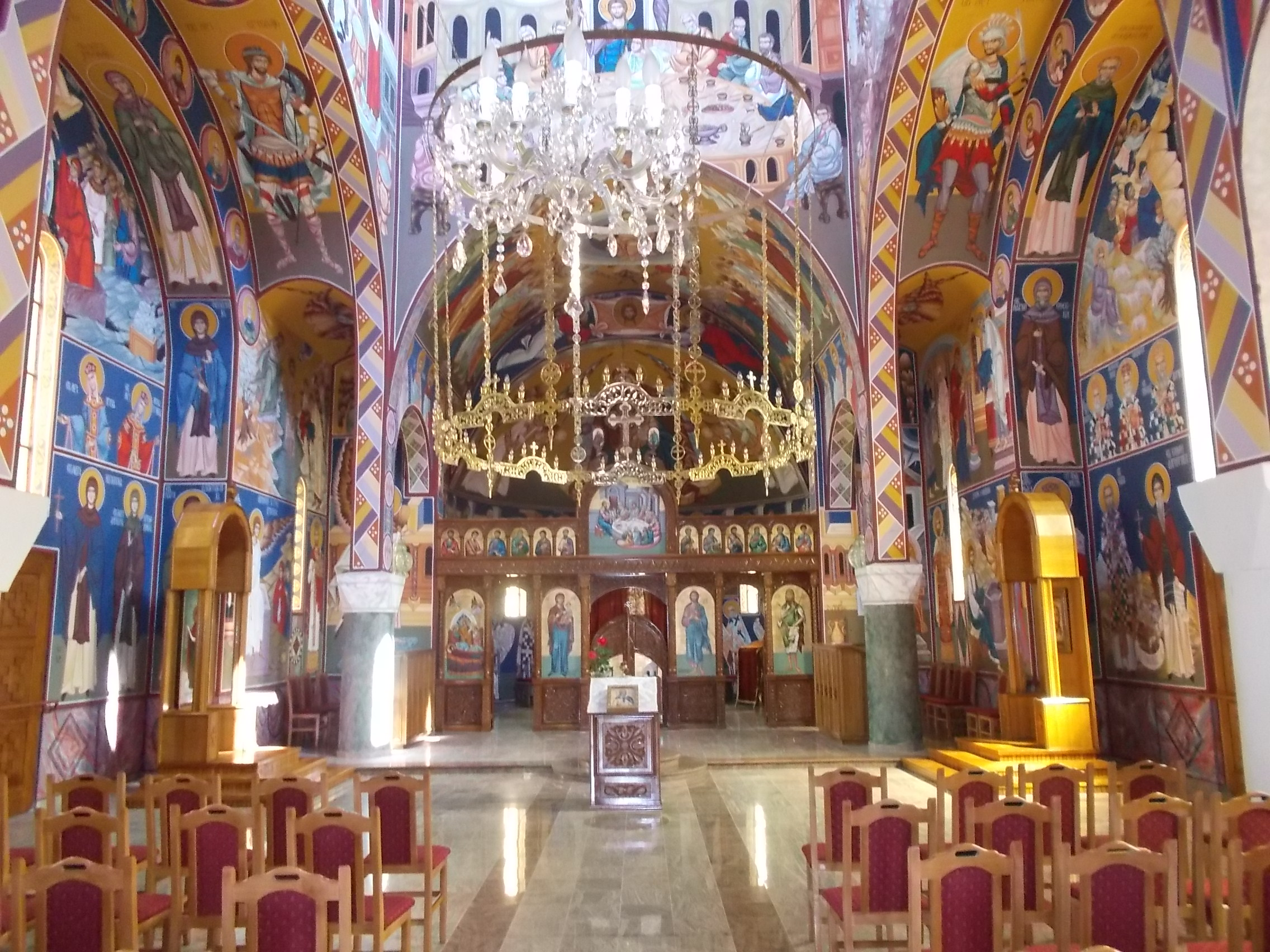
Interior

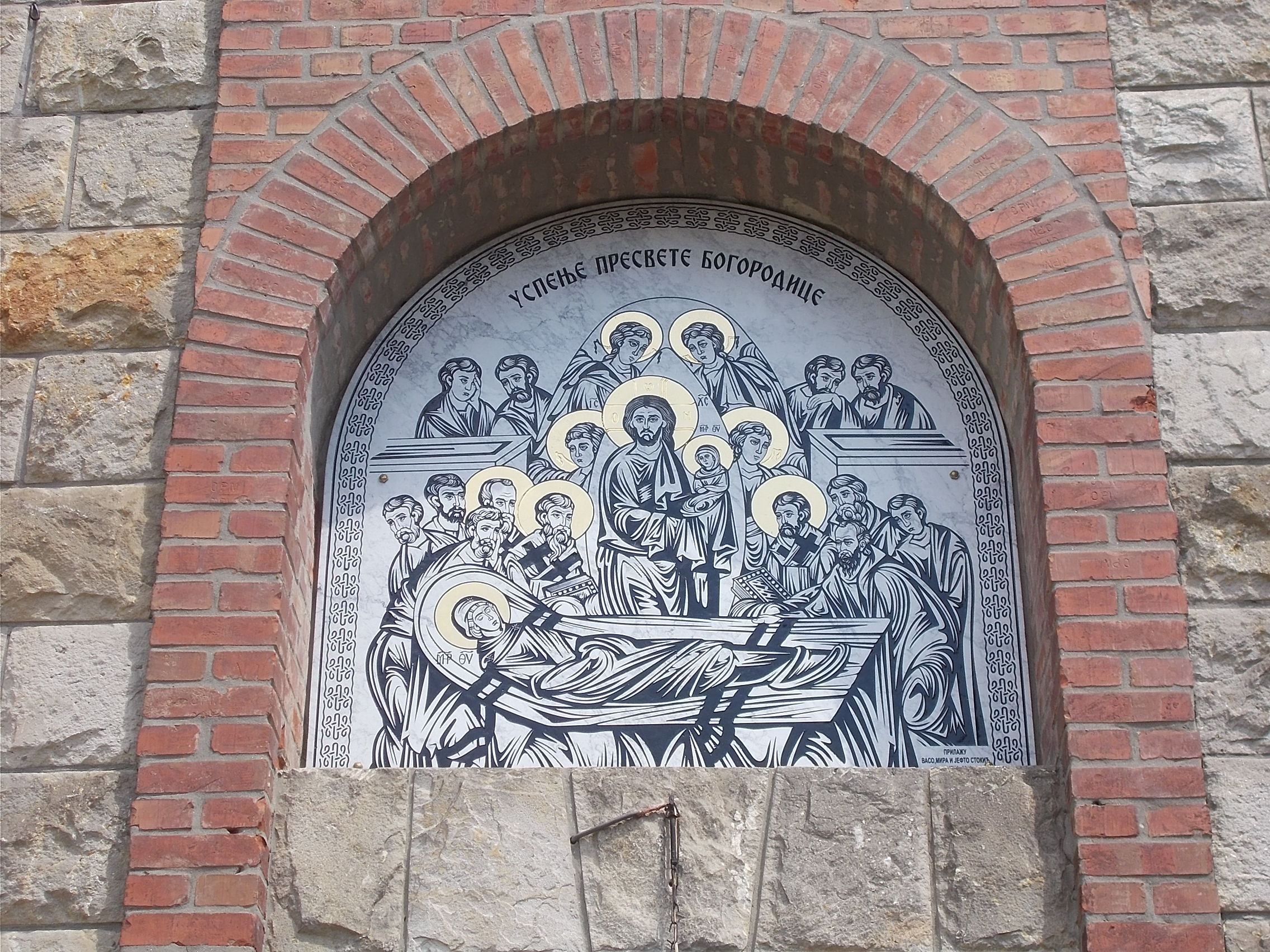
External wall

== See also ==
- List of Serbian Orthodox churches in Croatia
- Church of Saint Prince Lazar
- Eparchy of Osijek Plain and Baranya
- Serbs of Croatia
