= Church of Pentecost, Markušica =

Serbian Orthodox church in Markušica, Croatia

Church of Pentecost
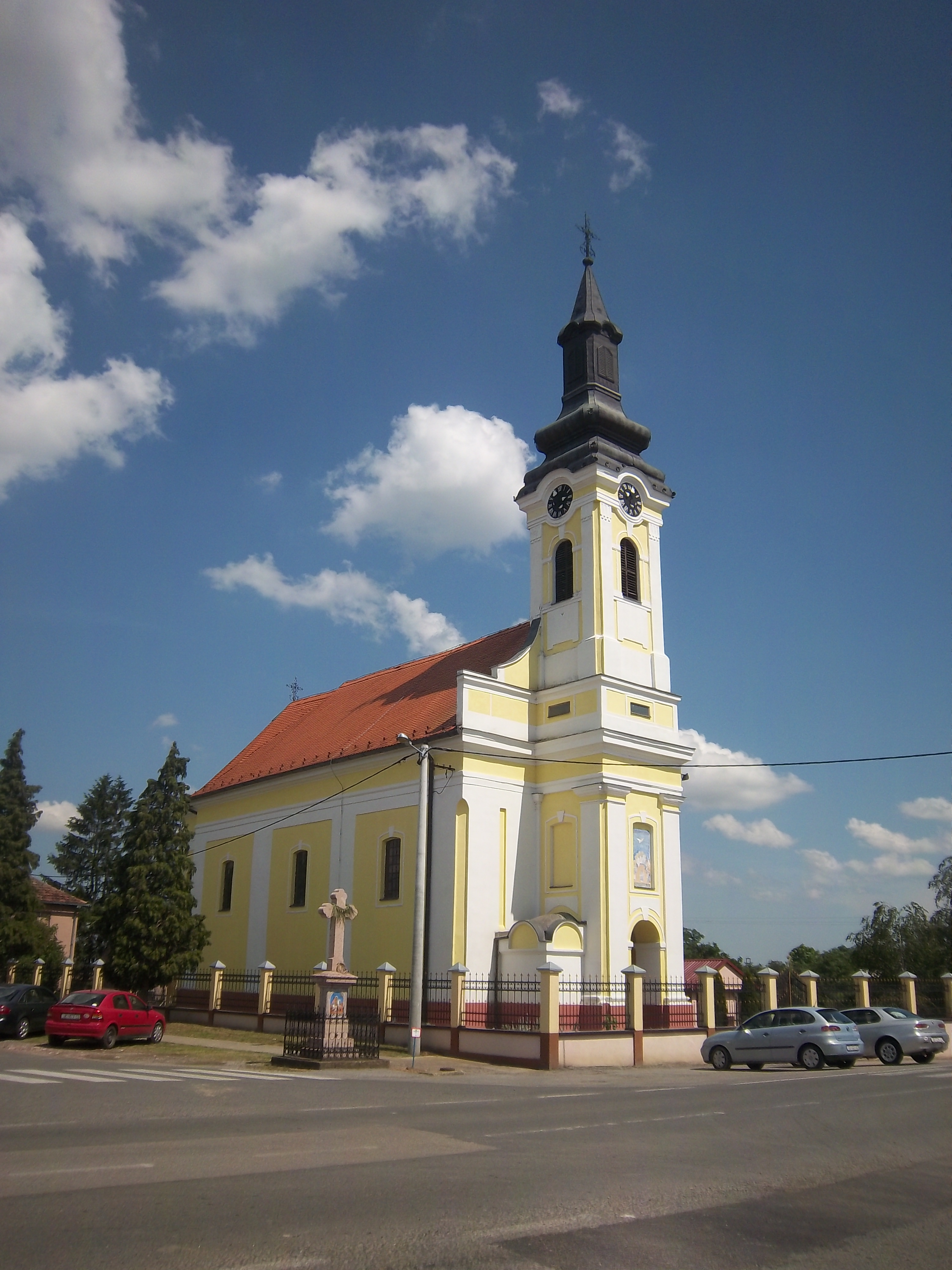
- Church of Pentecost
- Church of Pentecost
- 45°22′25.5″N 18°42′24″E
- Location: Markušica
- Country: Croatia
- Denomination: Serbian Orthodox

History
- Dedication: Pentecost

Architecture
- Style: Baroque and Classicism

Administration
- Archdiocese: Eparchy of Osijek Plain and Baranya

Church of Pentecost (Croatian: Crkva silaska Duha svetoga,Serbian: Црква силаска Духа светога) in Markušica is Serbian Orthodox church in eastern Croatia. The church is one of two in the Eparchy of Osijek Plain and Baranya that is dedicated to Pentecost. The church was built in the period between 1795 and 1810 at the site of an earlier wooden church dedicated in 1698.

== History ==
Alongside the wooden church in the village, up until the 1796 there was a Serbian Orthodox monastery close to the village, in Mali Antin, as well. The new church in Markušica inherited 1777 iconostasis from the wooden church. During the World War II in Yugoslavia and Genocide of Serbs in the Independent State of Croatia the church was converted into the Roman Catholic one. The most recent icon on the wall were painted in 1989 by Belgrade artist Zoran Đorđević. The church was damaged during the Croatian War of Independence in 1991 when the village of Markušica was a part of the self-proclaimed Eastern Slavonia, Baranja, and Western Syrmia. The general restoration works took place after the war in the 1999-2002 period.

== See also ==
- List of Serbian Orthodox churches in Croatia
- Eparchy of Osijek Plain and Baranya
- Serbs of Croatia
