= Church of St. Nicholas, Jagodnjak =

Serbian Orthodox church in Jagodnjak, Croatia

Church of St. Nicholas
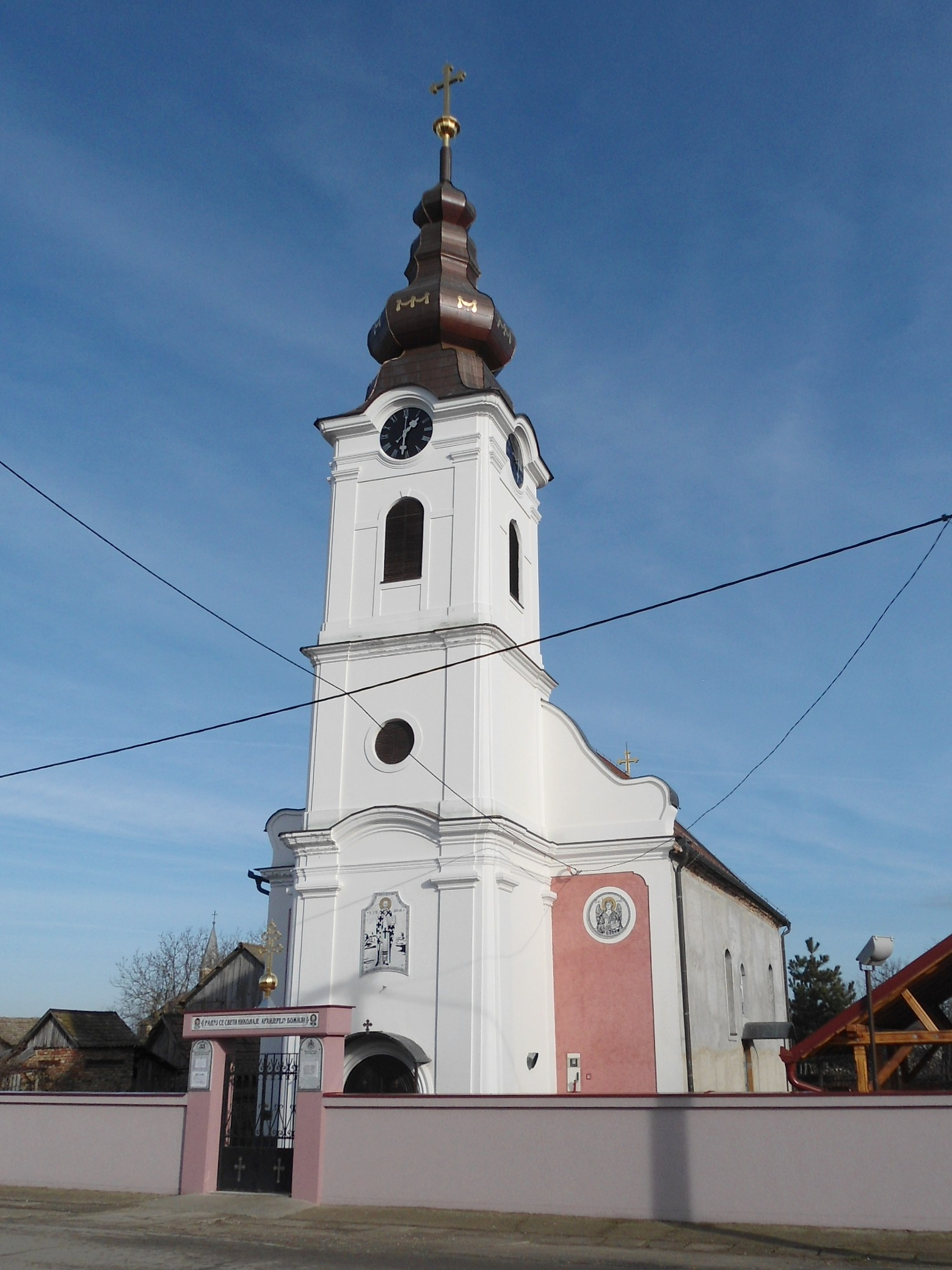

- Shown within Osijek-Branja County
- 45°42′N 18°35′E
- Location: Jagodnjak, Osijek-Baranja County
- Country: Croatia
- Denomination: Serbian Orthodox

History
- Status: Church
- Dedication: St. Nicholas

Architecture
- Functional status: Active
- Style: Baroque

Administration
- Archdiocese: Eparchy of Osječko polje and Baranja

Church of St. Nicholas (Serbian: Crkva svetog Nikole, Serbian Cyrillic: Црква светог Николе) in Jagodnjak is Serbian Orthodox church in eastern Croatia. The church was built in 1725. Church gain attention in 2012 when local believer claimed apparation of Nectarios of Aegina in her dream. In 2013 special place in church with saint's icon was built, and pilgrimage to Aegina was organized. In 2015 Eparchy of Osijek Plain and Baranya initiated building of smaller church dedicated to Nectarios of Aegina.

== See also ==
- List of Serbian Orthodox churches in Croatia
- Eparchy of Osijek Plain and Baranya
- Serbs of Croatia
