= Church of the Presentation of the Theotokos, Popovac =

Serbian Orthodox church in Popovac, Croatia

Church of the Presentation of the Theotokos
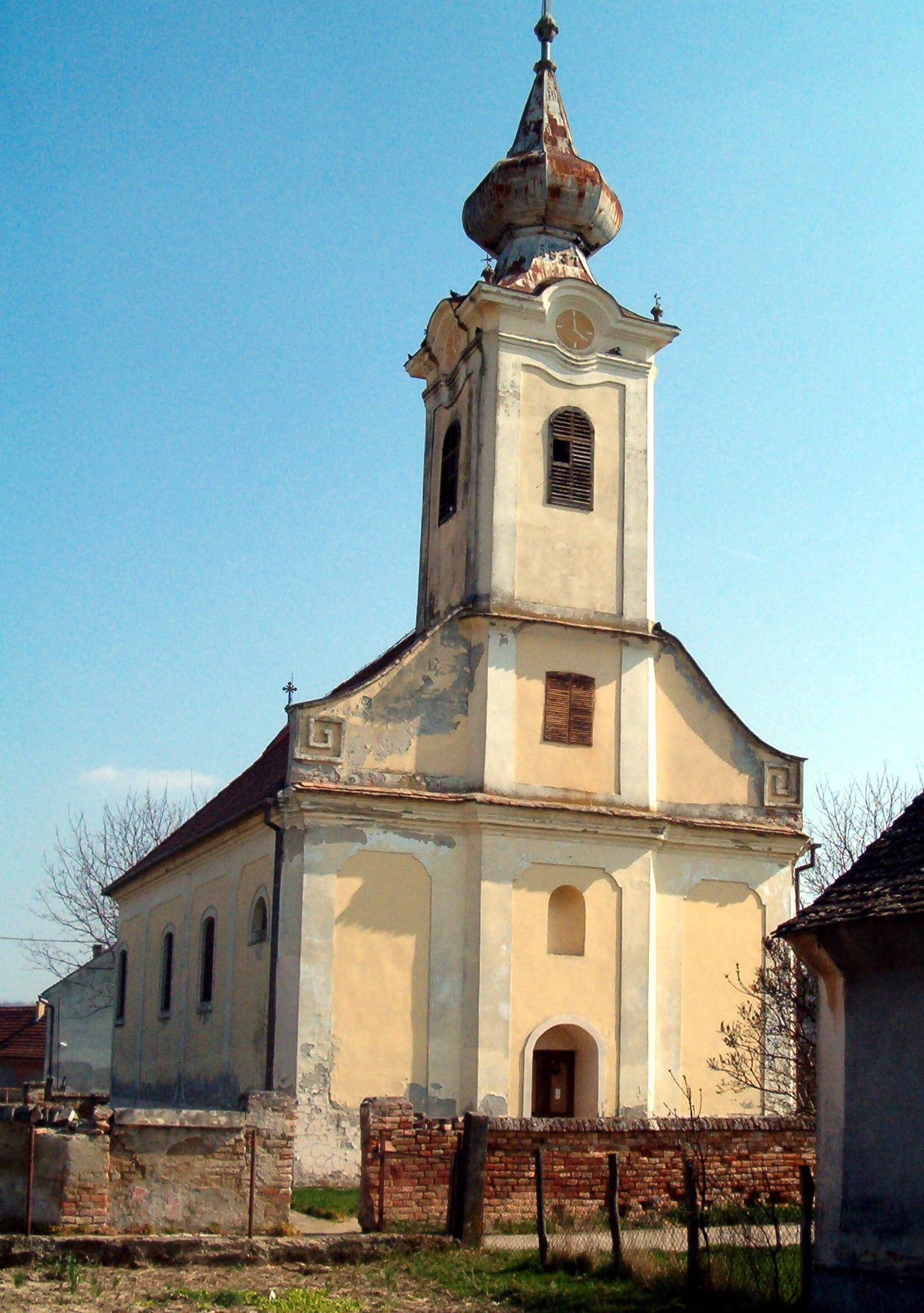
- Church of the Presentation of Mary
- Country: Croatia
- Denomination: Serbian Orthodox

History
- Dedication: Presentation of Mary

Architecture
- Years built: date unknown (18th century)

Administration
- Archdiocese: Eparchy of Osijek Plain and Baranya

The Church of the Presentation of the Theotokos (Serbian: Црква Ваведења пресвете Богородице; Croatian: Crkva Vavedenja presvete Bogorodice) in Popovac is a Serbian Orthodox church in eastern Croatia. The exact date of the construction of the church is unknown with dates ranging from 1726 (wooden inscription kept at the church), local judge report noting that the foundations were built in 1767 and Baranya County statistical report in 1757 mention the church in the village. The building was reconstructed between 1905 and 1912. Today, it is one of the three Serbian Orthodox churches in the municipality.

== See also ==
- List of Serbian Orthodox churches in Croatia
- Eparchy of Osijek Plain and Baranya
- Serbs of Croatia
