= Donji grad, Osijek =

Donji grad Gradska četvrt Donji grad
- City district of Osijek
- Donji Grad City District
- Location within Osijek-Baranja County Location within Croatia
- Coordinates: 45.557°N 18.722°E
- Country: Croatia
- Region: Slavonia
- County: Osijek-Baranja
- City: Osijek

Government
  - President of Council: Marko Bagarić (HDSSB)

Population (2001)
  - Total: 11,020

Donji grad (Croatian for Lower Town) is a city district in the eastern part of Osijek, Croatia. In 2001 it had 11,020 inhabitants distributed across 5,100 households.

Day of the city district is on 12 September, on feast of Glorious Name of Mary.
