= Saint Demetrius Cathedral, Dalj =

Serbian Orthodox cathedral in Dalj, Croatia

Saint Demetrius Cathedral
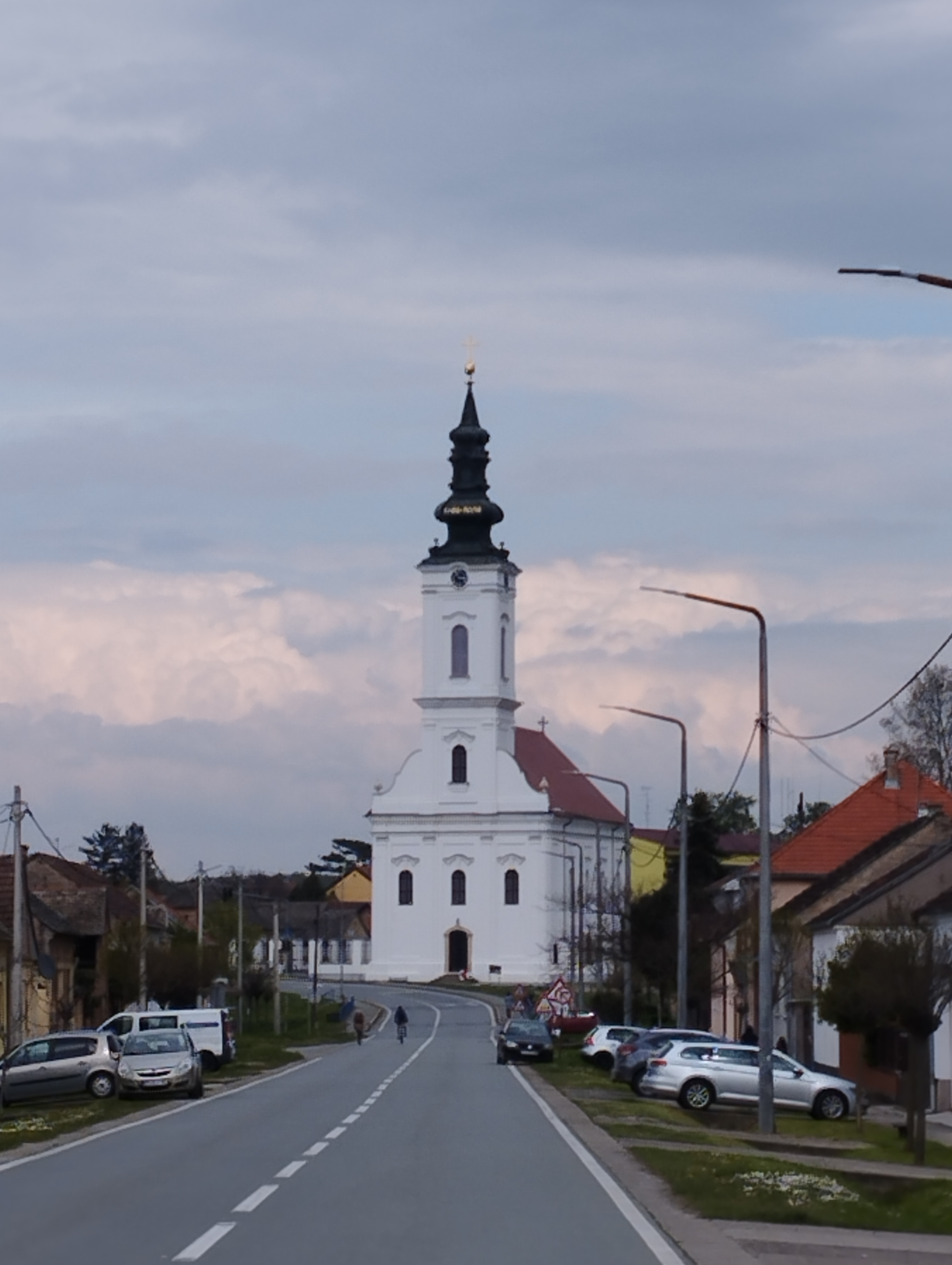
- Saint Demetrius Cathedral, pictured in 2023
- Saint Demetrius Cathedral
- 45.4840°N 18.9870°E
- Location: Dalj
- Country: Croatia
- Denomination: Serbian Orthodox Church

History
- Status: Church
- Dedication: Demetrius of Thessaloniki

Architecture
- Functional status: Active
- Style: Baroque

Specifications
- Height: 50 m

Administration
- Archdiocese: Eparchy of Osijek Plain and Baranya

The Saint Demetrius Cathedral (Serbian: Саборна црква Светог Димитрија; Croatian: Saborna crkva Svetog Dimitrija) is an Eastern Orthodox church located in Dalj, Croatia. It is under jurisdiction of the Eparchy of Osijek Plain and Baranya of the Serbian Orthodox Church and serves as its cathedral church.

Over the years, the church has been a central place of worship for the Serbian Orthodox community in the Podunavlje region, enduring multiple restorations and reconstructions, particularly after damage sustained during both world wars.

== History ==
The church was built in the period after the Great Migration of the Serbs. The first church on the site was a small wooden structure built in 1715. The current, more substantial church was completed in 1799, with its interior decoration and iconostasis added later, in 1824. The church's iconostasis was completed in 1824, and the church was consecrated in 1840. It has undergone several renovations throughout its history, including in 1837, 1866, 1901, 1931, 1949, and 2004.

During World War II, the church suffered severe damage under the quisling Ustaše regime of the Independent State of Croatia. It was closed on 12 July 1941, after which the church bells were removed, the iconostasis was demolished (although most of the icons were preserved), the roof tiles were taken off, the tower was dynamited, and parts of the church walls were destroyed.

The church became the cathedral of the newly-established Eparchy of Osijek Plain and Baranya in 1991. Prior to this, the area was part of the Eparchy of Srem, headquartered in Sremski Karlovci, Serbia.

On March 25, 1997, at the time when a short-lived Serb parallel entity of Eastern Slavonia, Baranja, and Western Syrmia was still governed by the United Nations UNTAES administration in the immediate aftermath of the Croatian War of Independence, the Holy Synod of the Serbian Orthodox Church organized its regular session in Dalj. During this session, Serbian Patriarch Pavle addressed the clergy and faithful, acknowledging the new reality by stating, "This is now the state of Croatia," and emphasized the importance of respecting this fact. Both Patriarch Pavle and the Holy Synod urged the Serb community to remain in their homes, encouraging them to stay in the region. Patriarch Pavle expressed optimism for the future but acknowledged the complex situation, encouraging the Serb community to stay and contribute positively despite the challenging circumstances. Following the Synod's meeting, Vojislav Stanimirović conveyed the Patriarch's greetings and blessings to the members of the Regional Assembly, along with a message encouraging the Serb community to obtain Croatian personal documents and to participate in the upcoming elections.

On April 8, 2005, the bells of the Saint Demtrius Cathedral rang in unison with Roman Catholic churches of the Roman Catholic Archdiocese of Đakovo–Osijek and around the world to mark the death and funeral of Pope John Paul II, reflecting a moment of global remembrance.

== Architecture ==
Originally built in 1715, the current church was completed in 1799, combining of Baroque and Classicist architectural styles. It is the largest Serbian Orthodox cathedral in Croatia and a protected cultural and historical monument. The height of the bell tower is 50 metres, church width is 16 meters and length 36 meters. The church's iconostasis, crafted in 1824, adds to its cultural prominence.

== Patriarchal Palace ==
The Patriarchal Palace in Dalj, also known as the Summer Residence of Serbian Patriarchs, is a building located next to the cathedral and nowadays is the seat of the Eparchy of Osijek Plain and Baranya serving as well as the bishop's residence.

It is constructed in 1754 under the patronage of Metropolitan Pavle Nenadović and originally served as the administrative center for the Lordship of Dalj, which managed 25,000 acres of arable land, meadows, pastures, forests, and fishponds. This extensive estate, established in 1706, included the villages of Borovo and Bijelo Brdo, in addition to Dalj. From 1920s up to the World War II it was used as a summer residence for Serbian patriarchs. Following World War II, the palace was temporarily repurposed for various functions, including a school, a cooperative, and as the residence of the managers of patriarchal properties. However, by the 1980s, the building had significantly deteriorated. Under the efforts of Bishop Lukijan, the Patriarchal Palace underwent a complete restoration between 1994 and 2004.

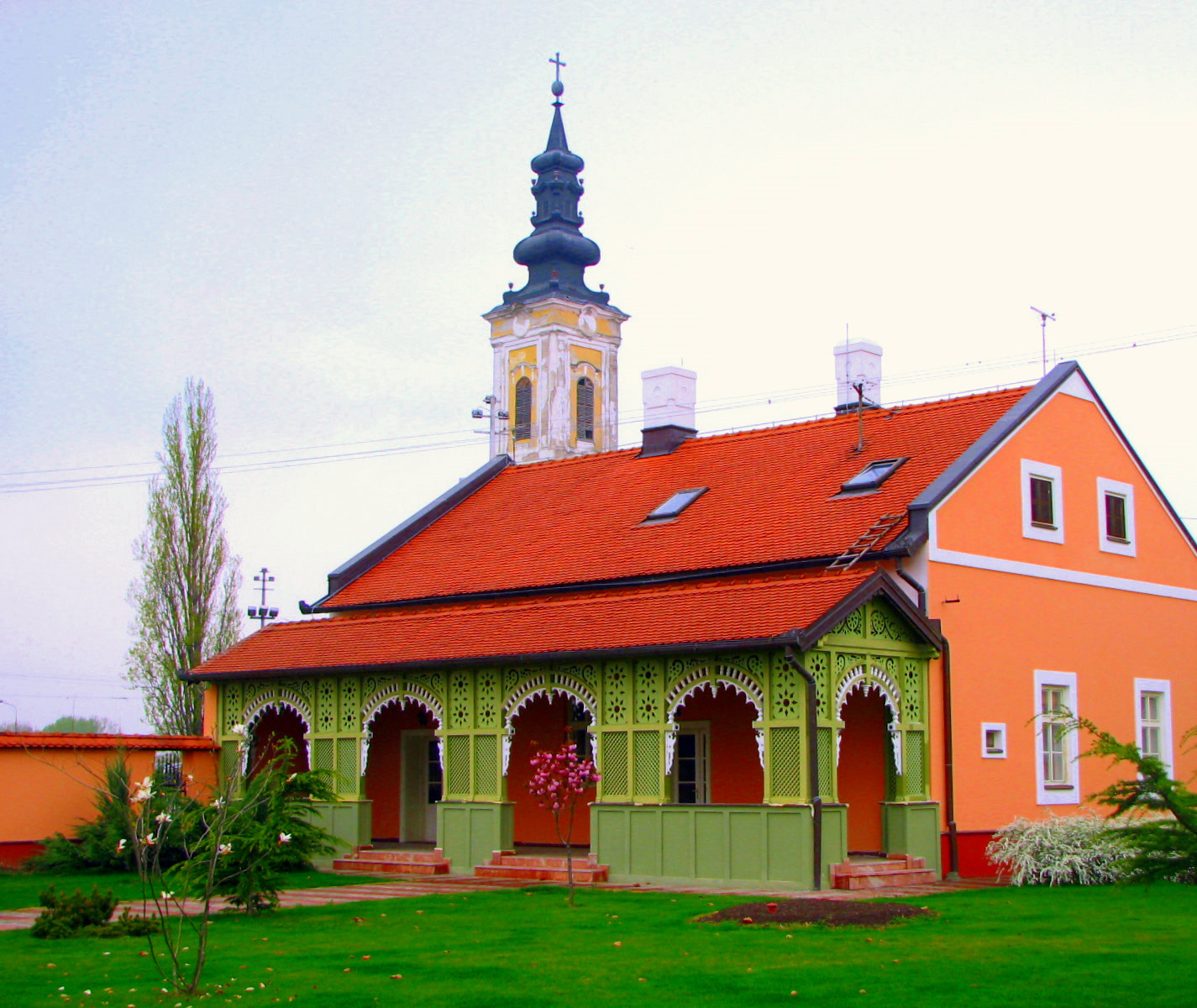

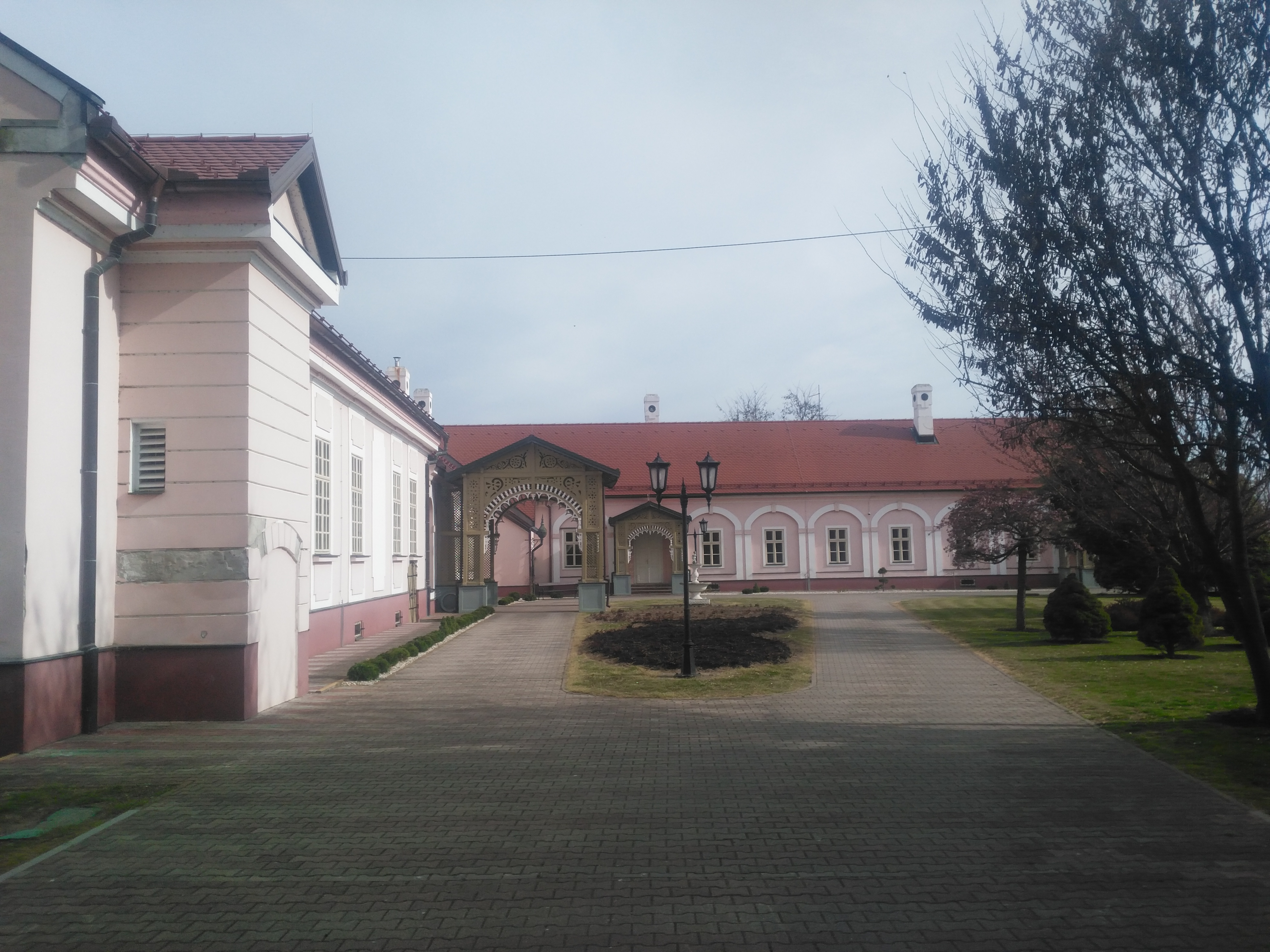

== See also ==
- List of Serbian Orthodox churches in Croatia
- Lordship of Dalj
- Serbs of Croatia
