= Popovac, Osijek-Baranja County =

Popovac
- Municipality
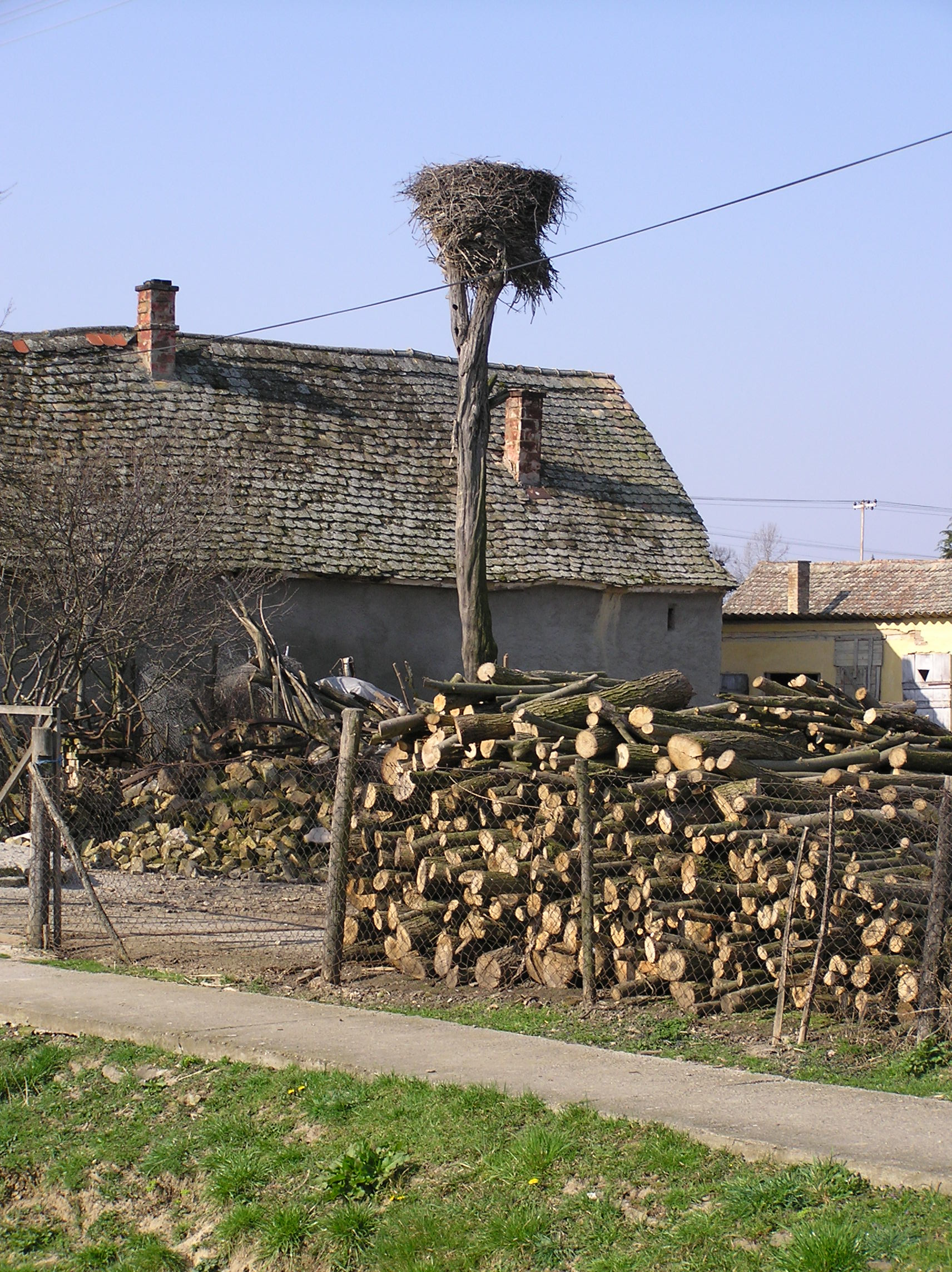

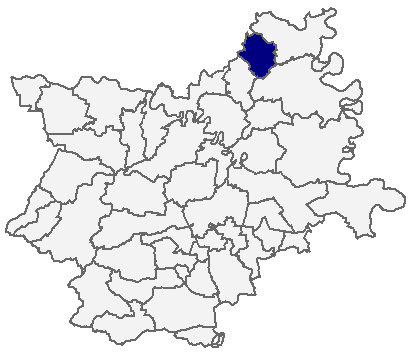
- Popovac municipality within Osijek-Baranja County

- Location of Popovac in Croatia Popovac (Croatia) Popovac (Europe)
- Coordinates: 45°48′33.12″N 18°39′29.88″E
- Country: Croatia
- Region: Baranja (Podunavlje)
- County: Osijek-Baranja County

Government
  - Mayor: Zoran Kontak

Area
  - Municipality: 62.4 km^{2} (24.1 sq mi)
  - Urban: 27.6 km^{2} (10.7 sq mi)

Population (2021)
  - Municipality: 1,446
  - Density: 23.2/km^{2} (60.0/sq mi)
  - Urban: 738
  - Urban density: 26.7/km^{2} (69.3/sq mi)
- Time zone: UTC+1 (Central European Time)
- Website: popovac.hr

Popovac (Hungarian: Baranyabán, Serbian Cyrillic: Поповац) is a village and municipality in Osijek-Baranja County, Croatia. There are 2,084 inhabitants in the municipality (2011 census). Popovac is an underdeveloped municipality, which is statistically classified as the First Category Area of Special State Concern by the Government of Croatia.

Until the end of World War II, the majority of the inhabitants was Danube Swabian, also called locally as Stifolder, because their ancestors arrived in the 17th and 18th centuries from Fulda (district). Most of the former German settlers were expelled to Allied-occupied Germany and Allied-occupied Austria in 1945–1948, as a result of the Potsdam Agreement.

Popovac is known for its fish festival (fišijada), which is organized in September every year.

== Name ==
Its name derived from the Slavic word "pop" ("priest" in English). In Hungarian, the village is known as Baranyabán.

== Demographics ==
As of 2011, ethnic groups in the municipality are:

- 71.40% Croats
- 17.03% Serbs
- 3.89% Hungarians
- 1.54% Romani
- 1.39% Slovenians

Before World War II, almost 70% of the population of Popovac was made up of Danube Swabians. In November 1944, virtually the entire German population of the village was evacuated. They settled permanently in Göppingen.

== Politics ==
=== Minority councils ===
Directly elected minority councils and representatives are tasked with consulting tasks for the local or regional authorities in which they are advocating for minority rights and interests, integration into public life and participation in the management of local affairs. At the 2023 Croatian national minorities councils and representatives elections Serbs of Croatia fulfilled legal requirements to elect 10 members municipal minority councils of the Popovac Municipality.

== Geography ==
Popovac is situated between border with Hungary in the north-west, municipality of Draž in the north-east, municipality of Kneževi Vinogradi in the south-east, and municipality of Beli Manastir in the south-west.

The municipality of Popovac includes the following settlements:

- Popovac (pop. 959)
- Branjina (pop. 322)
- Kneževo (pop. 803)

== History ==
The oldest known name of this place was "Antianae", which dating from the time of the Romans. In the 6th century, this area was settled by Slavs, who founded a village named "Ban".

== Other ==
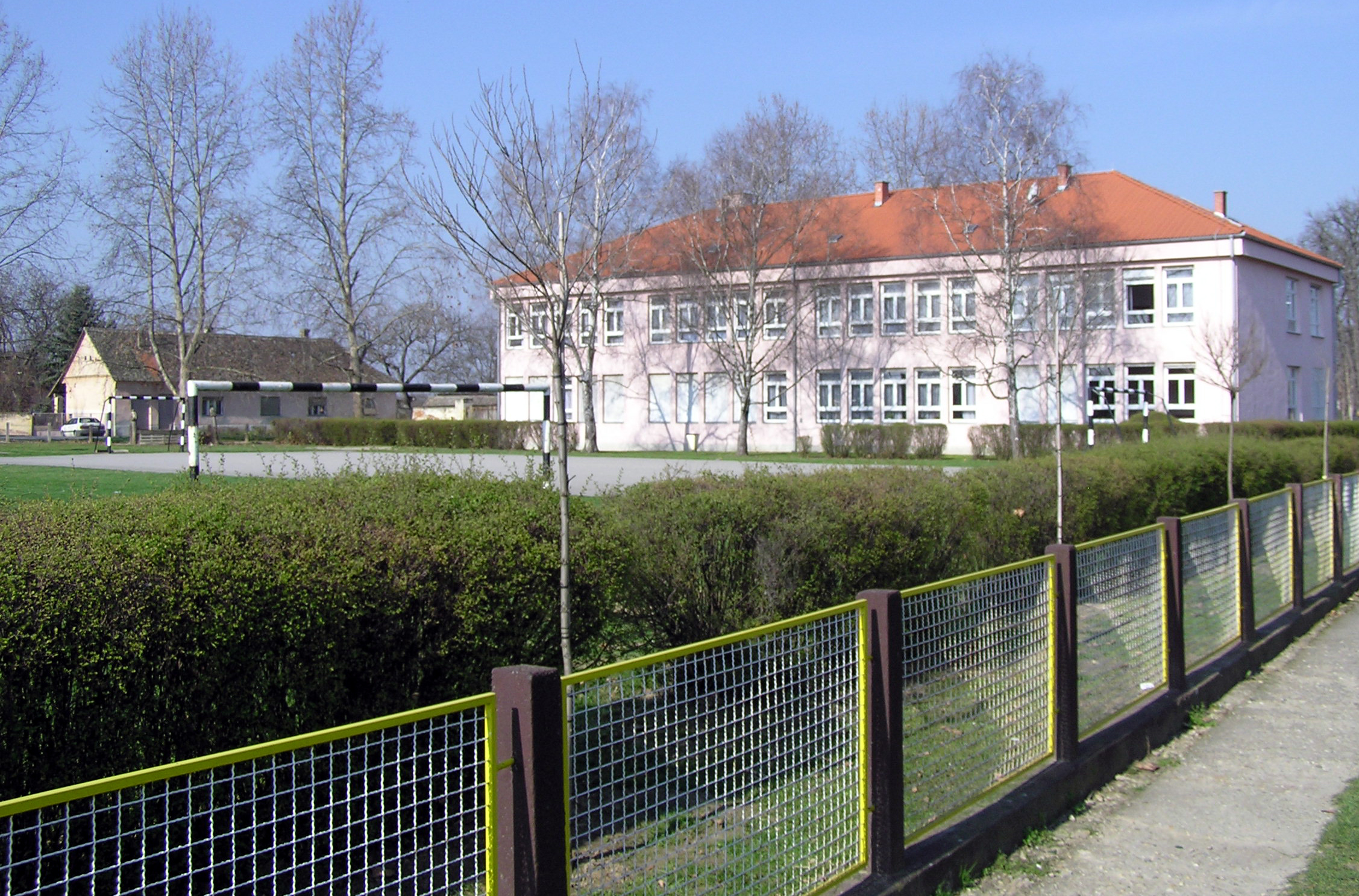
Popovac Elementary School

There is an elementary school in Popovac with 169 students and teaching staff of 23.

== See also ==
- Church of the Presentation of the Theotokos, Popovac
- Osijek-Baranja County
- Baranja
