= Church of the Transfiguration of the Lord, Šarengrad =

Serbian Orthodox church in Šarengrad, Croatia

Church of the Transfiguration of the Lord
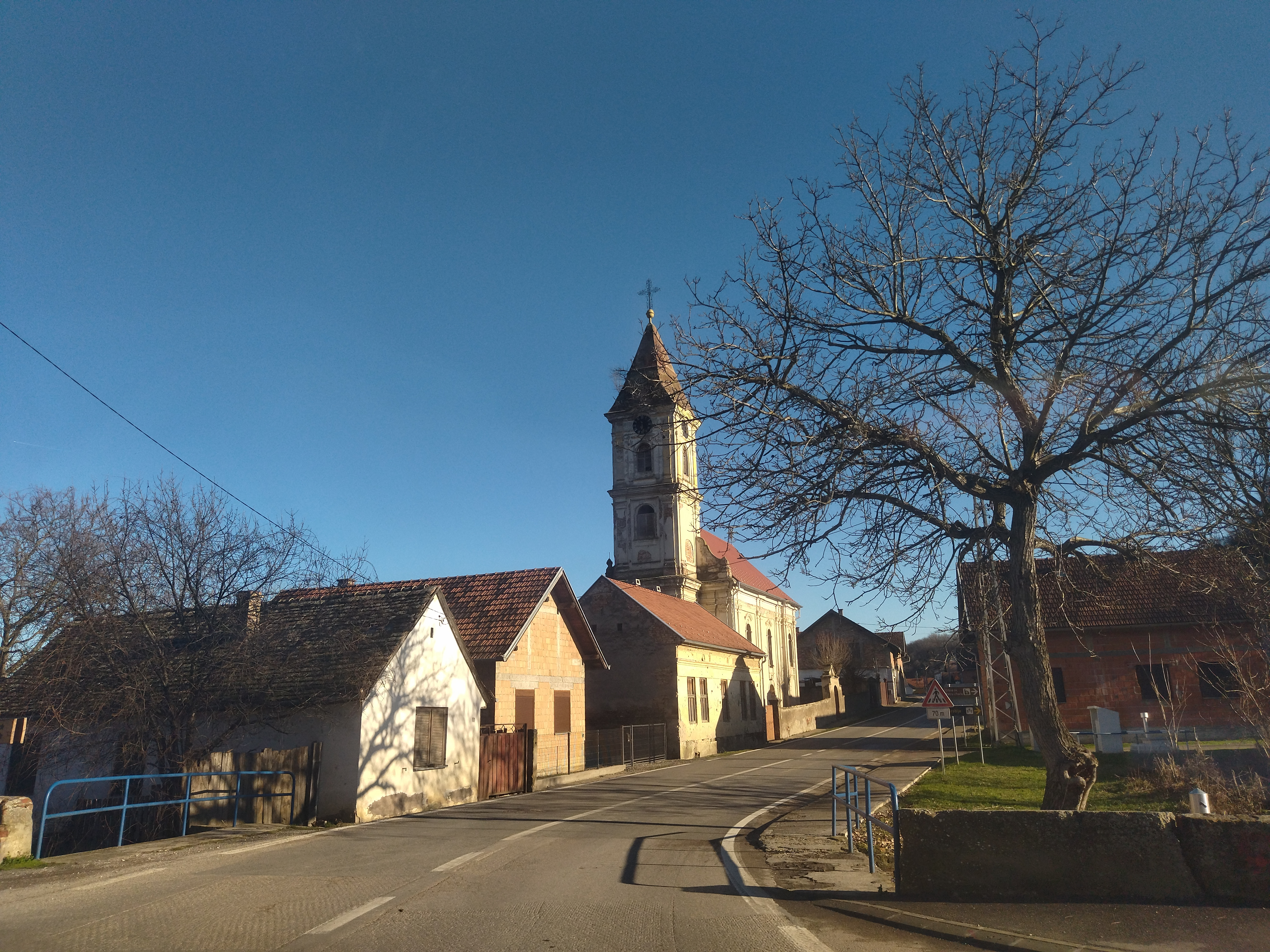
- Church of the Transfiguration of the Lord
- Church of the Transfiguration of the Lord
- 45°14′02″N 19°16′57″E
- Location: Šarengrad
- Country: Croatia
- Denomination: Serbian Orthodox

History
- Dedication: Transfiguration of the Lord

Architecture
- Style: Baroque and Classicism

Administration
- Archdiocese: Eparchy of Osijek Plain and Baranya

The Church of the Transfiguration of the Lord (Croatian: Hram Uznesenja Gospodnjeg, Serbian Cyrillic: Храм Вазнесења Господњег) in Šarengrad is a Serbian Orthodox church in eastern Croatia. The church was built between 1791 and 1800. The church is located in the centre of the village next to the main D2 road between Vukovar and Bačka Palanka and near the Danube river. Before the construction of the contemporary building there was an older and smaller Serbian Orthodox church in the village which was built in 1704. The first historical records on the intention to build the new church come from 1781 when at the time Vukovar Estates plenipotentiary Michael Cseh wrote to Count Hugo Philippus Eltz on the issue of production of materials for the new building.

The full construction cost of the building was 5600 forints which was comparatively low price at the time and with the majority of costs being covered by parish itself. The Church of the Transfiguration of the Lord was built in a period of intensive activities on building new and upgrading existing Orthodox churches in what is now eastern Croatia with bell towers being built at the Church in Negoslavci and Marinci, reconstruction of the church in Ilok and construction of new churches in Orolik (1793), Tovarnik (1797), Dalj (1799), Opatovac (1802), Markušica (1805) and Mirkovci (1809).

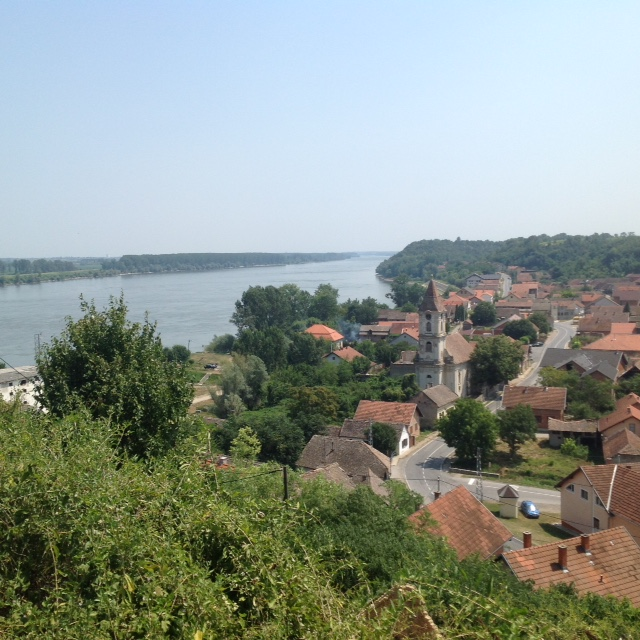
View of the village, church and the Danube river

== See also ==
- List of Serbian Orthodox churches in Croatia
- Eparchy of Osijek Plain and Baranya
- Serbs of Croatia

== General bibliography ==
- Damjanović, Dragan (2014). "Pravoslavna crkva u Šarengradu - primjer barokno-klasicističkoga Gesamtkunstwerka". Scrinia Slavonica (in Croatian). 14 (1). Department for the History of Slavonia, Srijem and Baranja of the Croatian Institute of History: 107–128 – via Hrčak.
