= Mirkovci railway station =

Railway station in Croatia

Mirkovci

General information
- Location: Mirkovci; Vukovar-Syrmia County; Croatia
- Coordinates: 45.2787°N 18.8562°E
- Operator: Croatian Railways
- Line: M104 railway (Croatia)
- Platforms: 2 high platforms
- Tracks: 2
- Connections: No direct public transport available

Construction
- Parking: Limited free public parking
- Cycle facilities: Yes
Location

Mirkovci railway station (Croatian: Željezničko stajalište Mirkovci, Serbian Cyrillic: Железничко стајалиште Мирковци) is a railway stop on Novska–Tovarnik railway in Croatia. The station is operated by Croatian Railways, the state-owned railway company. It is located at the northern edge of the village of Mirkovci.

== History ==
In late June of 1996, railway traffic between Mirkovci railway station and Vinkovci railway station was re-established after being suspended for more than five years during the Croatian War of Independence. The inaugural train from Vinkovci was accompanied by UNTAES administrator Jacques Paul Klein.

On 19 January 2012 reconstruction of the Mirkovci railway station was completed. It was a part of reconstruction of nine railway stations on 67 kilometer route between Vinkovci and Tovarnik-Croatia–Serbia border funded from the Instrument for Pre-Accession Assistance of the European Union (48%) and Croatian Government (52%).

== See also ==
- Orient Express which used the line on which the station is located.
- Tovarnik railway station
- Vinkovci railway station
- Zagreb–Belgrade railway
- Church of St. Nicholas, Mirkovci

Preceding station	Mirkovci railway station	Following station
Vinkovci	M104 railway (Croatia); Novska to Tovarnik route	Jankovci
