= Mirkovci, Croatia =

Mirkovci
- Village (Selo)
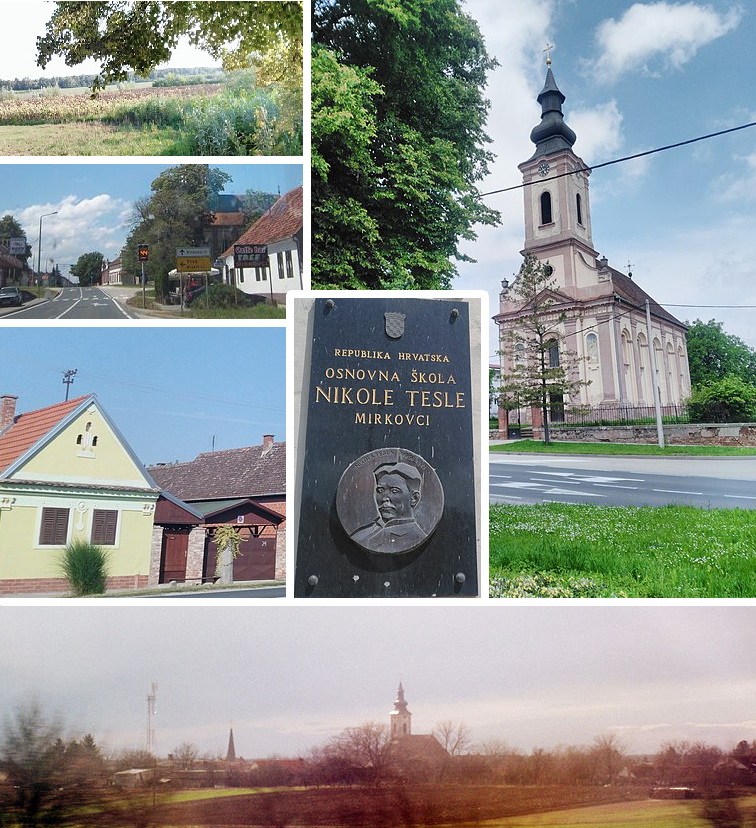

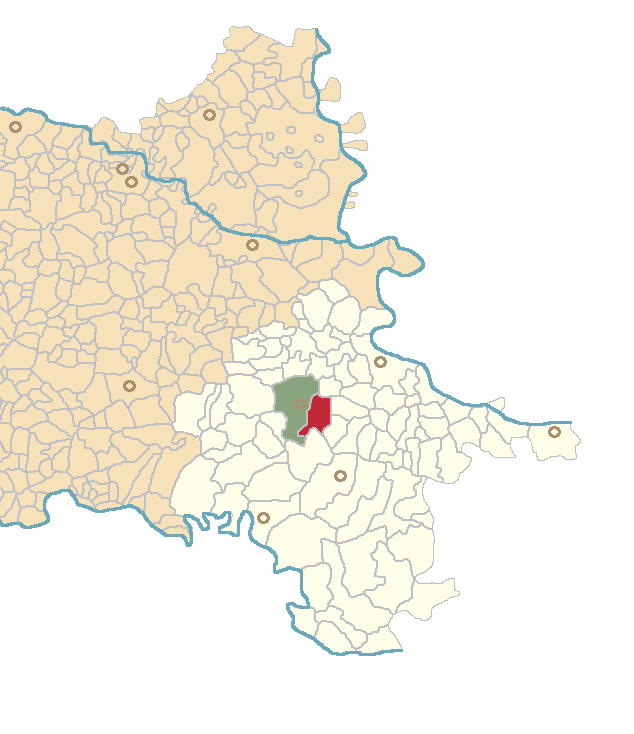

- Location within Vukovar-Syrmia County Location within Croatia Location within Europe
- Coordinates: 45.271°N 18.850°E
- Country: Croatia
- Region: Syrmia (Podunavlje)
- County: Vukovar-Syrmia
- City: Vinkovci

Area
  - Total: 26.0 km^{2} (10.0 sq mi)
- Elevation: 95 m (312 ft)

Population (2021)
  - Total: 2,731
  - Density: 105/km^{2} (272/sq mi)
- Demonym(s): Mirkovčanin (♂) Mirkovčanka (♀) (per grammatical gender)
- Time zone: UTC+1 (CET)
  - Summer (DST): UTC+2 (CEST)
- Vehicle registration: VK

Mirkovci (Serbian Cyrillic: Мирковци, Hungarian: Szegfalu, German: Sankt Emrich) is a village and suburb of the town of Vinkovci in eastern Croatia. It is geographically within the Syrmia and Podunavlje region. The village is located immediately southeast of Vinkovci separated from the rest of the town by Vinkovci-Gunja railway. At the time of 2011 Census, the local population was 3,283.

Mirkovci is a multiethnic settlement with Croat majority and Serb minority. Up until the end of the Croatian War of Independence Serbs were the majority population.

== History ==
The area in which the village is located has been continually inhabited since the Neolithic period. During the Roman Empire Colonia Aurelia Cibalae was established in the region during the reign of Hadrian and gained the status of urban settlement during the reign of Caracalla. Emperors Valentinian I and Valens were born in Cibalae.

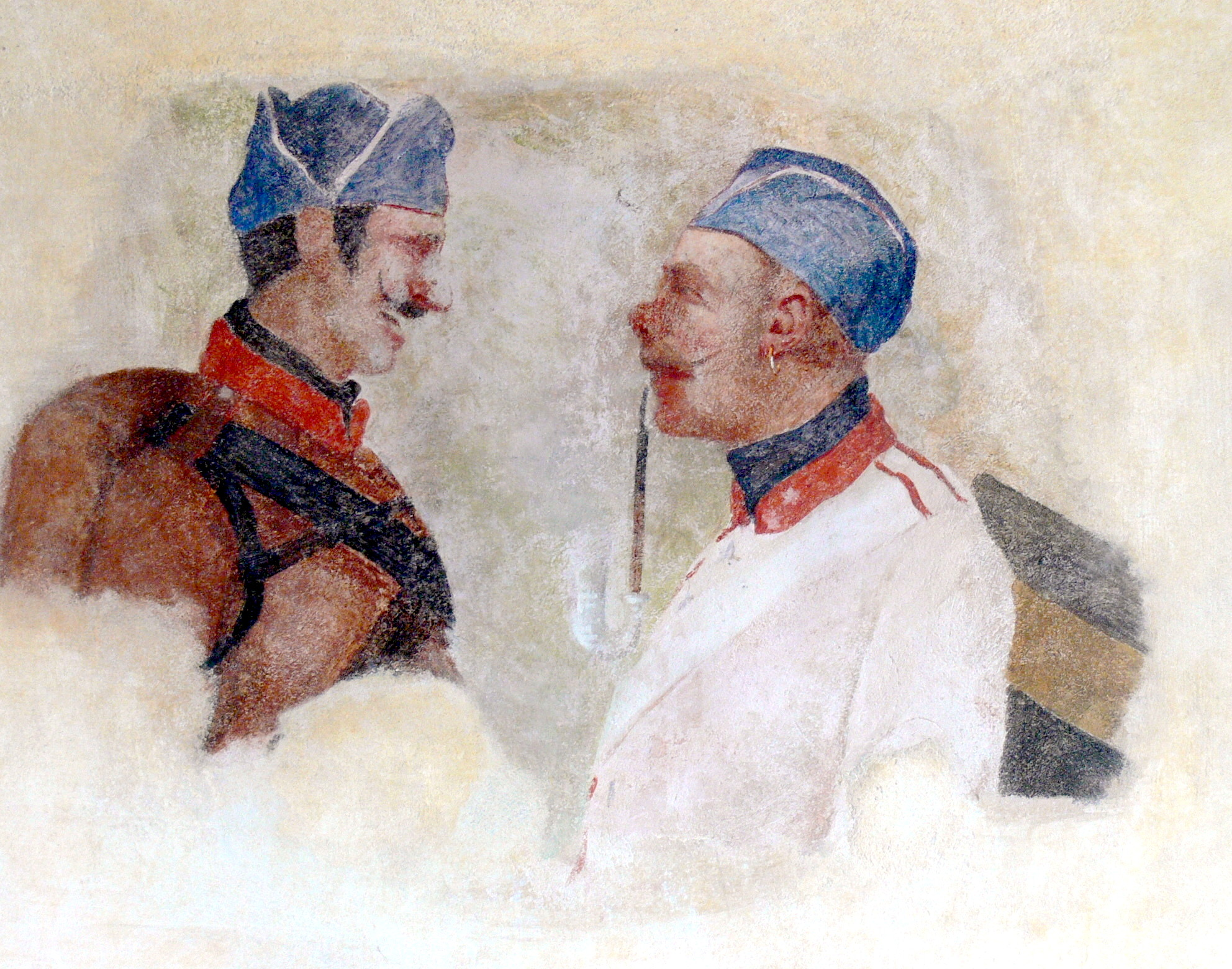
Fragment of Italian fresco showing soldiers of Austria-Hungary

From 1526 to 1687 Syrmia was part of the Ottoman Empire within the Budin Eyalet. At the end of this period the Great Migrations of the Serbs occurred resulting in Serb settlement in the region which was at the time part of Habsburg monarchy. Mirkovci was established in 18th century within the Slavonian Military Frontier, which acted as the cordon sanitaire against incursions from the Ottoman Empire in which Serb colonists were defending the Monarchy in return for land-grants and internal self-administration granted in Statuta Valachorum. Soldiers from Mirkovci fought in Austro-Turkish War (1788–1791), Napoleonic Wars, various battlefields during the Revolutions of 1848 under the command of Josip Jelačić and Joseph Radetzky von Radetz, the Second Italian War of Independence and the Third Italian War of Independence. Serbian Orthodox Church of St. Nicholas was constructed in period between 1804 and 1813. The village remained a part of the Slavonian Military Frontier until 1881 when the former was disestablished. Between 1881 and the end of Austro-Hungarian rule the village was part of the Kingdom of Croatia-Slavonia and its Syrmia County.

=== World War II ===
During the Second World War, 107 ethnic Serbs were transferred and killed in the Jasenovac concentration camp operated by the Croatian fascist Ustashe regime. At that time Serbs living under the rule of Independent State of Croatia were exposed to persecution of Serbs in the Independent State of Croatia. There are today 5 memorial plaques in Serbian Cyrillic alphabet commemorating Yugoslav Partisans and victims of Fascism which were set on the local community hall in 1958 during the Socialist Federal Republic of Yugoslavia time.

=== Croatian War of Independence ===
During the Croatian War of Independence, Mirkovci was under the control of Serb rebel forces. It was a part of the self-proclaimed SAO Eastern Slavonia, Baranja and Western Syrmia (1991–1992), Republic of Serbian Krajina (1992-1995) and United Nations protectorate of Eastern Slavonia, Baranja and Western Syrmia (1995-1998). In his book Warrior's Honour: Ethnic War and the Modern Conscience, Canadian author Michael Ignatieff writes;

- Theorists like Samuel Huntington, would lead me to believe that there is a fault line running through the back gardens of Mirkovci [a village in eastern Croatia], with the Croats in the bunker representing the civilization of the Catholic Roman West and the Serbs nearby representing Byzantium, Orthodoxy, and the Cyrillic East. ... here in Mirkovci, I don't see civilizational fault lines, geological templates that have split apart. These metaphors take for granted what needs to be explained: how neighbors once ignorant of very idea that they belong to opposed civilizations begin to think-and hate-in these terms, how they vilify and demonize people they once called friends...

During the war, Mirkovci was the seat of the Municipality of Mirkovci which covered areas of pre-war Vinkovci Municipality within the Republic of Serbian Krajina. The village was one of the main centers of Serb rebellion in Eastern Croatia.

=== UNTAES peacekeeping mission ===
Between 1996 and 1998 Mirkovci was under the United Nations Transitional Administration for Eastern Slavonia, Baranja and Western Sirmium administration. In late June of 1996, railway traffic between Mirkovci railway station and Vinkovci railway station was re-established after being suspended for more than five years. The inaugural train from Vinkovci was accompanied by UNTAES administrator Jacques Paul Klein.

=== Transitional Municipality of Mirkovci ===
The UNTAES mission made an executive decision to create the so-called Transitional Municipality of Mirkovci at the time of transition of the region to the control of the Croatian Government. In January 1997 Transitional Administrator Jacques Paul Klein established new municipalities of Trpinja, Negoslavci, Markušica, Šodolovci and Jagodnjak with Serb majority which are today part of the Joint Council of Municipalities. In Mirkovci and Tenja a suburb of Osijek, the economic and cultural centre of Slavonia, were declared so called transitional municipalities with Serb ethnic majority which were to become part of Vinkovci and Osijek respectively after an additional transitional period of one year. The new Transitional Municipality of Mirkovci covered the village of Mirkovci exclusively and not as in Krajina the entire area of pre-war Municipality of Vinkovci which were under the Serb rebel control.

=== Contemporary period ===
The period after the reintegration is marked by population increase, uncommon for the rest of the region, and the changing demographic composition of the village. A number of ethnic Croat refugees from Bosnia were settled in the village, while a significant number of Serbs decided to emigrate to Serbia or third countries in Europe and elsewhere. Today Croats constitute an absolute majority in the village with significant Serb minority. In 2010 the construction of the Roman Catholic church of Aloysius Stepinac was completed after 10 years of works making it the first Roman Catholic church in Mirkovci.

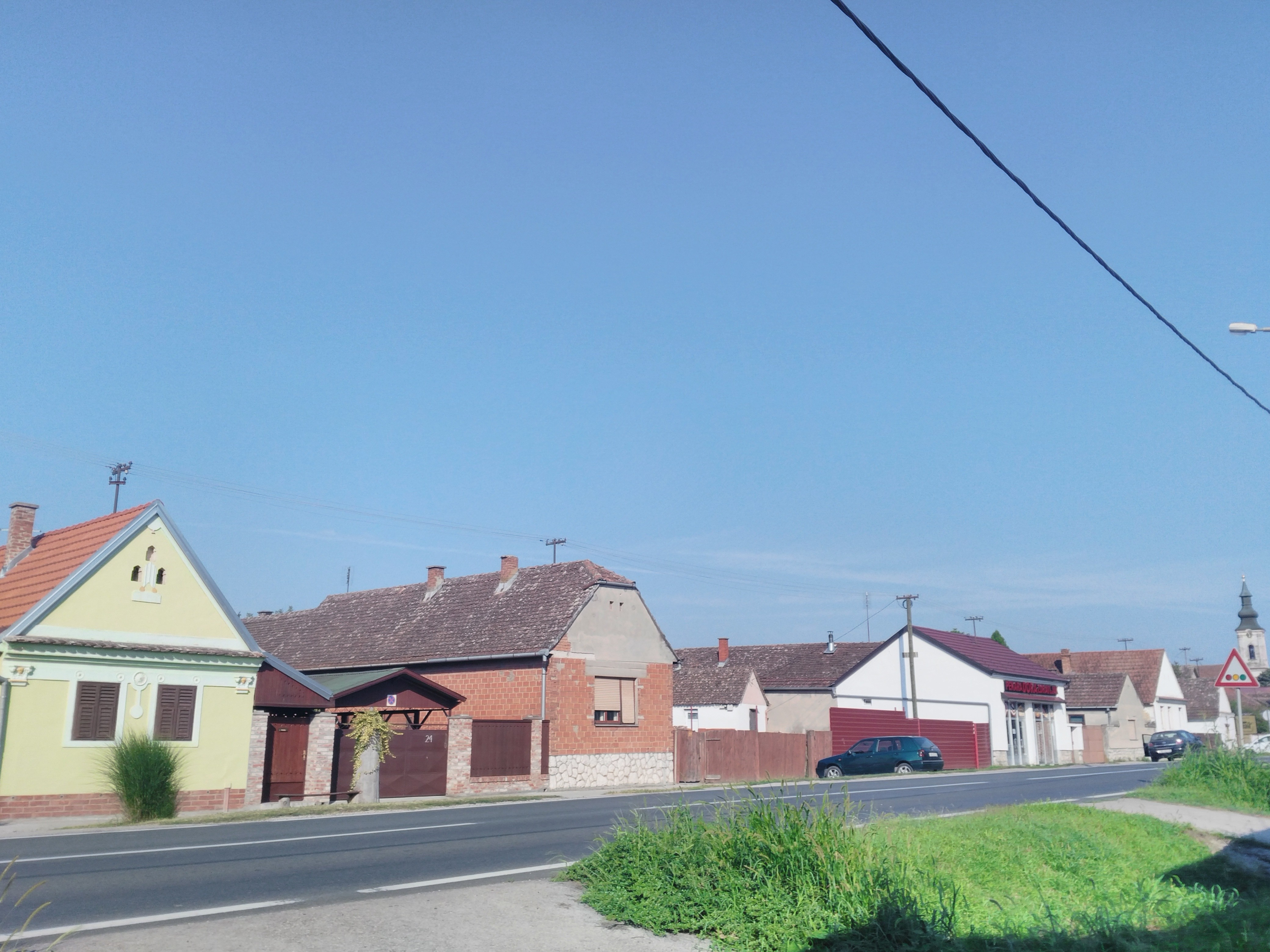
Main Street in Mirkovci – up to 2010 Vuk Stefanović Karadžić Street, subsequently Vukovar Street

One of the political issues of local significance was the naming of streets in the village. Elected leaders of new Croat ethnic majority community wanted to change street names in the village which were named during the Socialist Federal Republic of Yugoslavia and remained unchanged until the end of UNTAES mandate. At that time streets in Mirkovci were named after Vuk Stefanović Karadžić, Boško Buha, Veljko Vlahović, Edvard Kardelj, People's Liberation Army of Macedonia, 4 July-Fighter's Day and 29 November-Republic Day. Majority needed for the change was achieved in August 2010 when the new names after Vukovar and other cities and rivers in Croatia were proposed to the City Council of Vinkovci. Special 4 members commission was formed with 2 ethnic Croats and 2 Serbs tasked with creation of proposal for 42 new street names acceptable to both communities.

== Geography ==
Mirkovci are bordering village between regions of Slavonia and Syrmia. Its elevation is 95 meters above the sea level. The village lies in a flatland north to the Bosut river. The village is connected with the rest of the country by the D46 state road connecting it with the town of Vinkovci and continuing into Serbia as the State Road 120 to the nearest town of Šid.

== Education ==
=== Elementary School "Nikola Tesla" ===
Elementary School in Mirkovci was established in 1759 making it one of the oldest elementary schools in the region. In 1877 it moved to its current location with expansions and renovations taking place in 1900, 1959, 1969, 1992 and 2006. In 2006 the school took the name of Nikola Tesla marking 150th anniversary of scientist's birth.

In period between 1967 and 1997 school was known under the name Elementary School Simo Lončar. After the end of reintegration process relevant Croatian authorities decided to register school under the name Elementary School Mirkovci which it kept until 2006.

Education is conducted in two groups, either in Croatian or Serbian language. In school year 2009–10 233 pupils attended the school.

== Notable people ==
Notable people who were born or lived in Mirkovci include:

- Goran Vinčić, Serbian comedian

== See also ==
- Church of St. Nicholas, Mirkovci
- Church of St. Panteleimon, Mirkovci
- Mirkovci railway station
