= Church of St. Panteleimon, Mirkovci =

Serbian Orthodox church in Mirkovci, Croatia

Church of St. Panteleimon
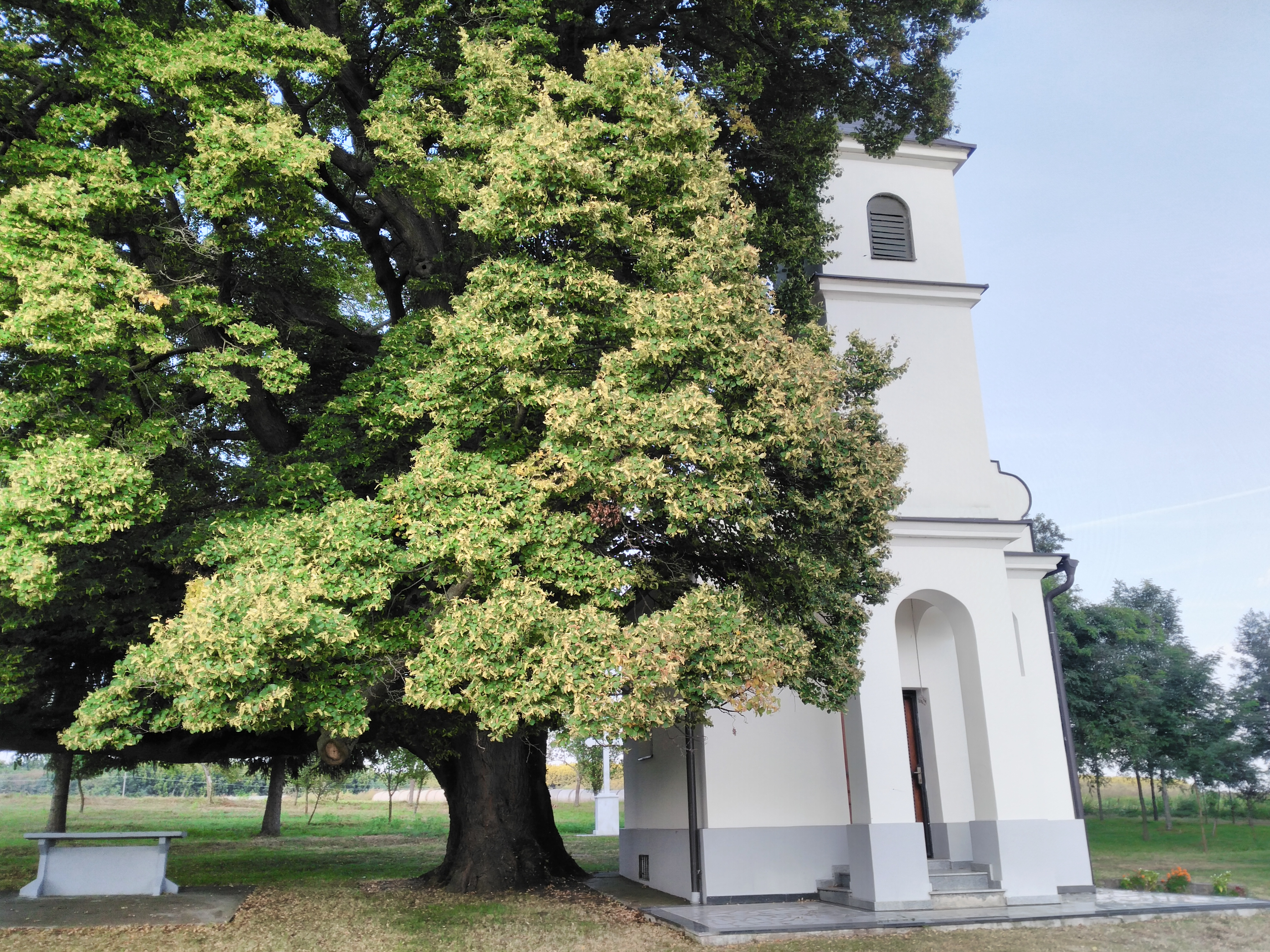
- Church of St. Panteleimon and its tilia veteran tree
- Church of St. Panteleimon
- 45°15′27″N 18°51′58″E
- Location: Mirkovci, Vukovar-Syrmia County
- Country: Croatia
- Denomination: Serbian Orthodox

History
- Status: Chapel
- Dedication: Saint Pantaleon

Architecture
- Functional status: Active
- Years built: 1910

Administration
- Archdiocese: Eparchy of Osijek Plain and Baranya

Church of St. Panteleimon (Serbian Cyrillic: Црква светог Пантелејмона, Croatian: Crkva svetog Panelejmona) known also as Vodica (Serbian Cyrillic: Водица) in Mirkovci in eastern Croatia is a secondary Serbian Orthodox church of the local parish Church of St. Nicholas.

Contemporary church at the site of a water source was constructed in 1910. The church is used by the Orthodox population of Mirkovci and the rest of Syrmia for the summer celebration of Saint Pantaleon. The site is known of its tilia veteran tree. The church is located outside of the village and off the main D46 road in village's field estate.

The church uses certain Gothic Revival architectural elements (notably windows) which are not commonly found in Eastern Orthodox sacral architecture.

== Gallery ==
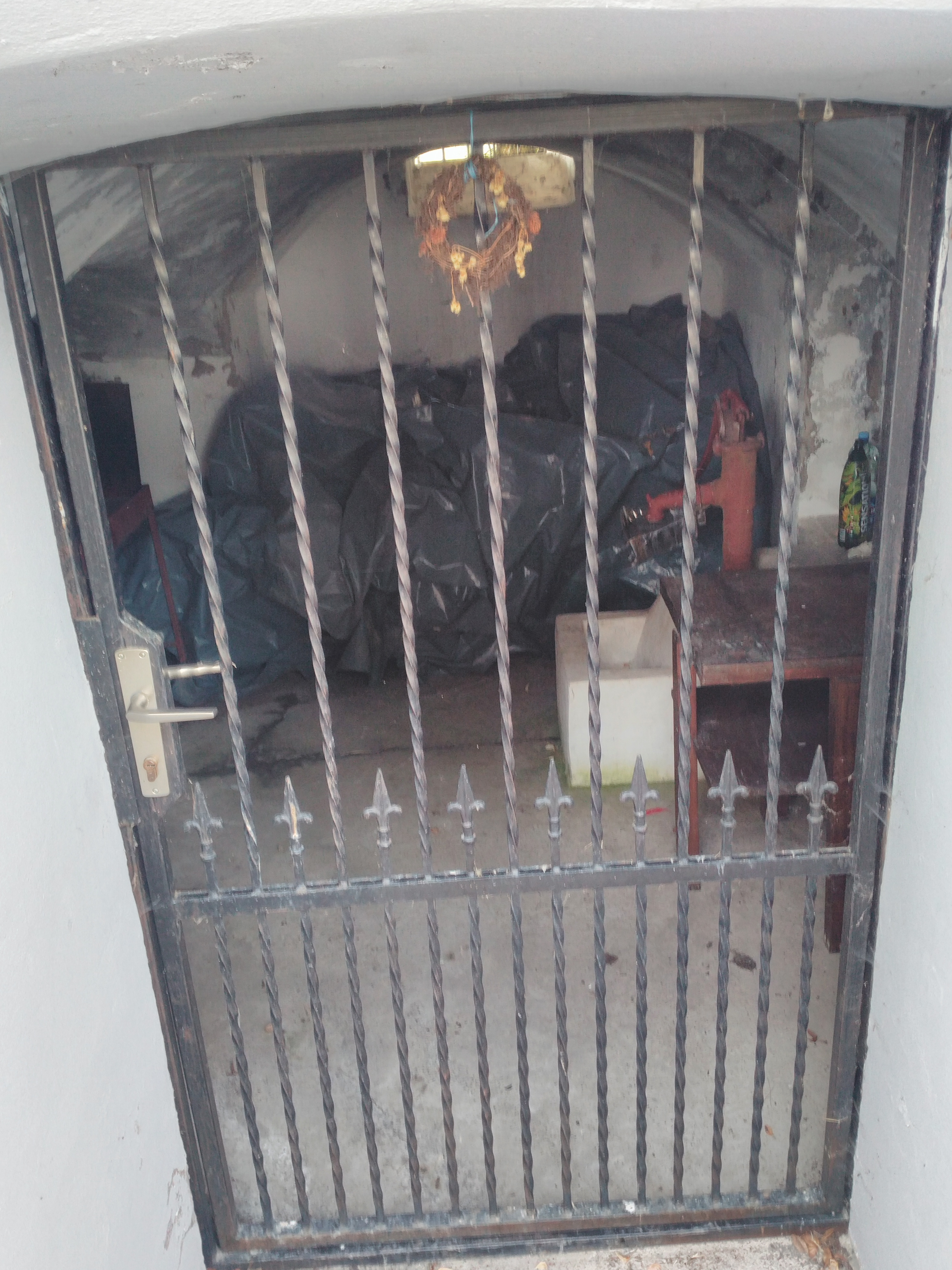
Water source in the basement

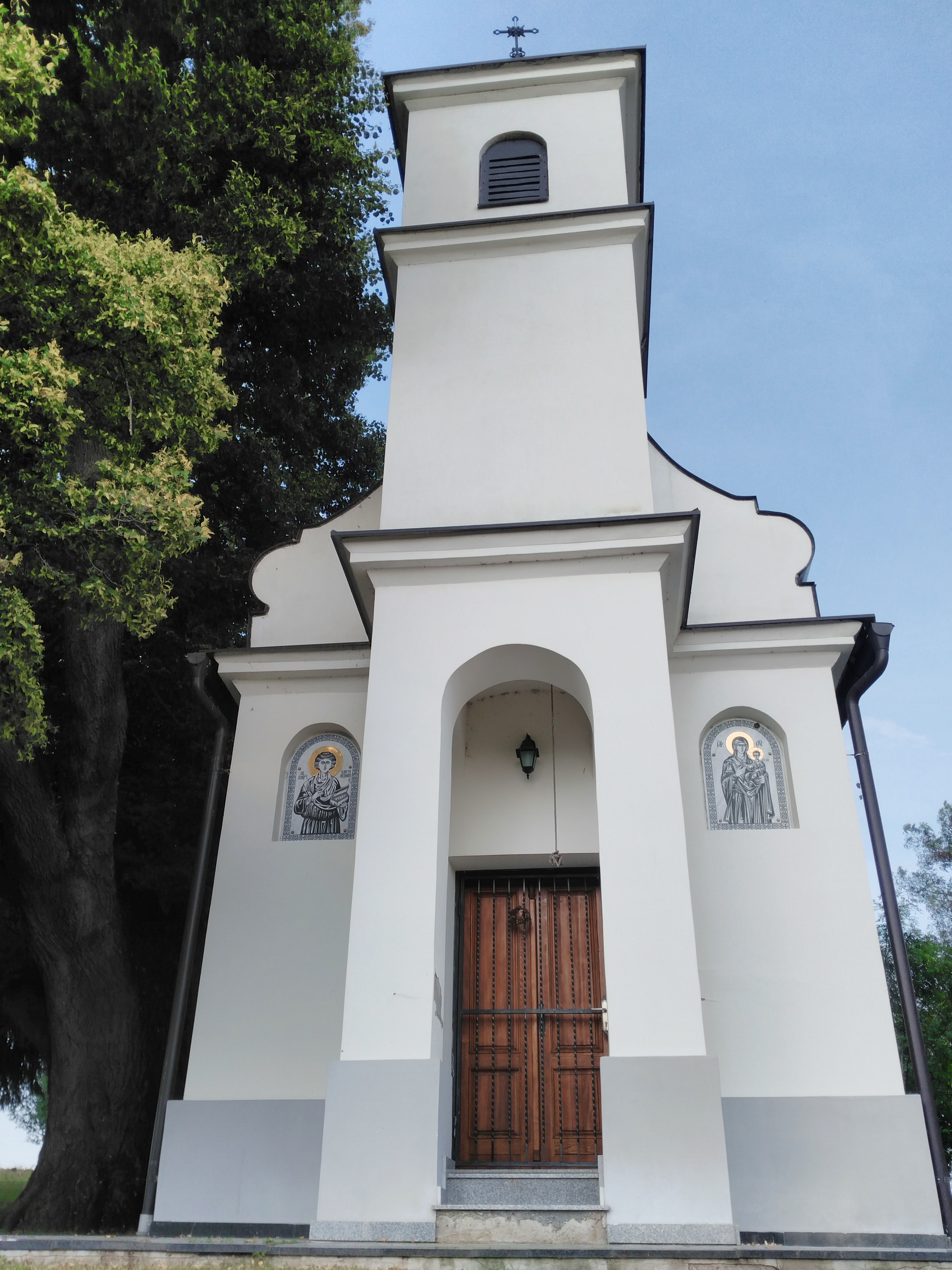
Church tower

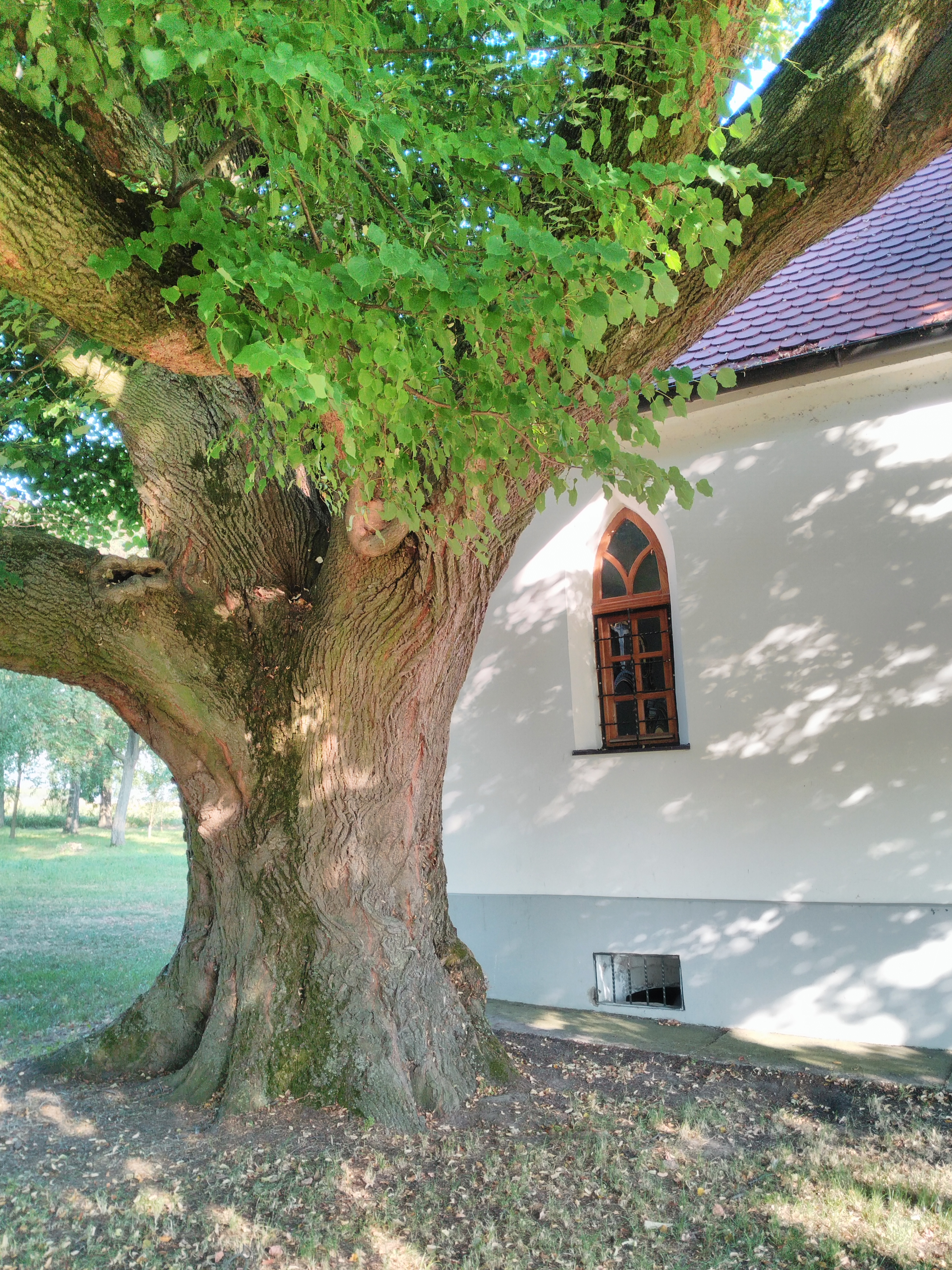
Tilia veteran tree

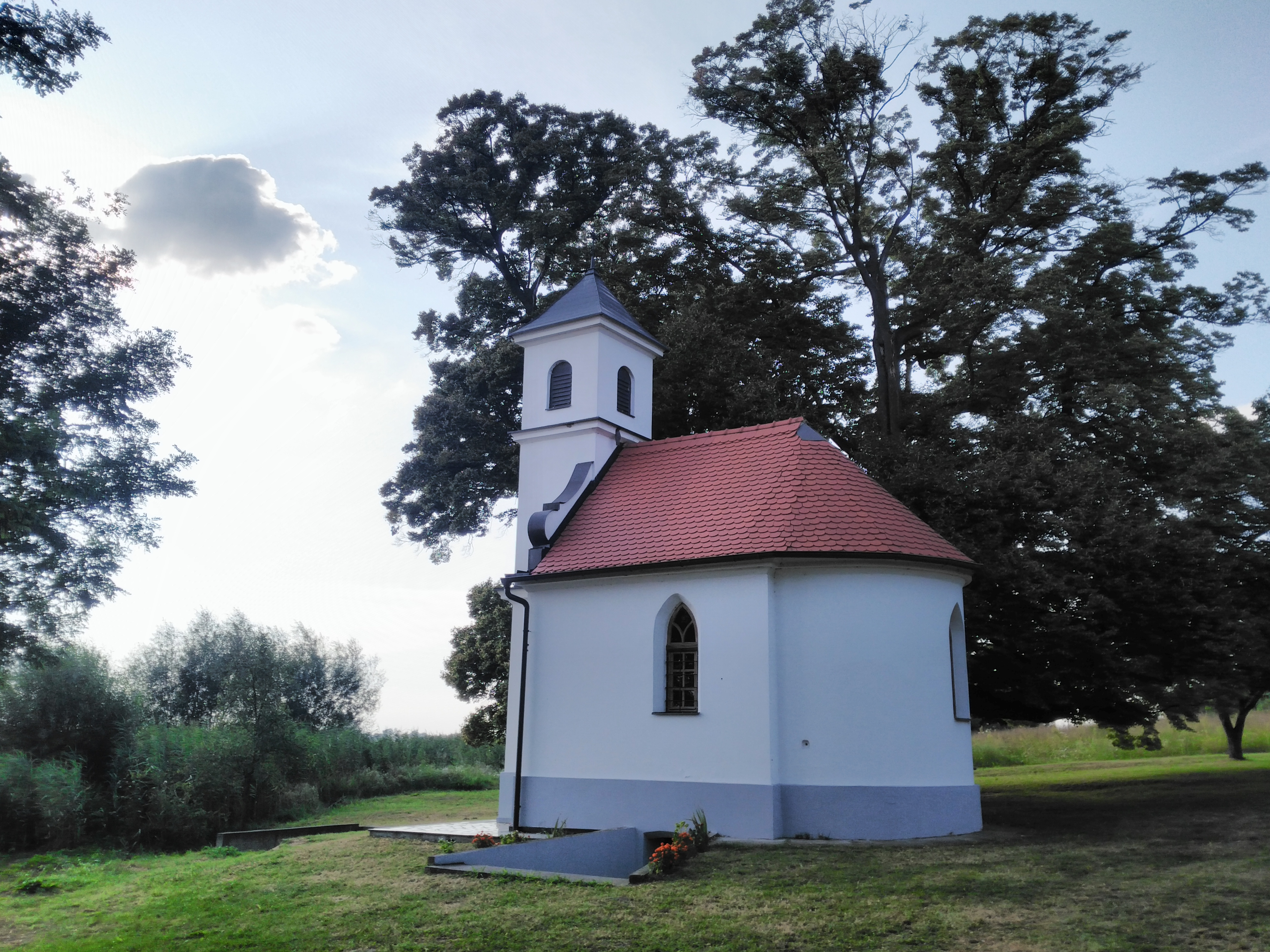
Church and Tilia tree

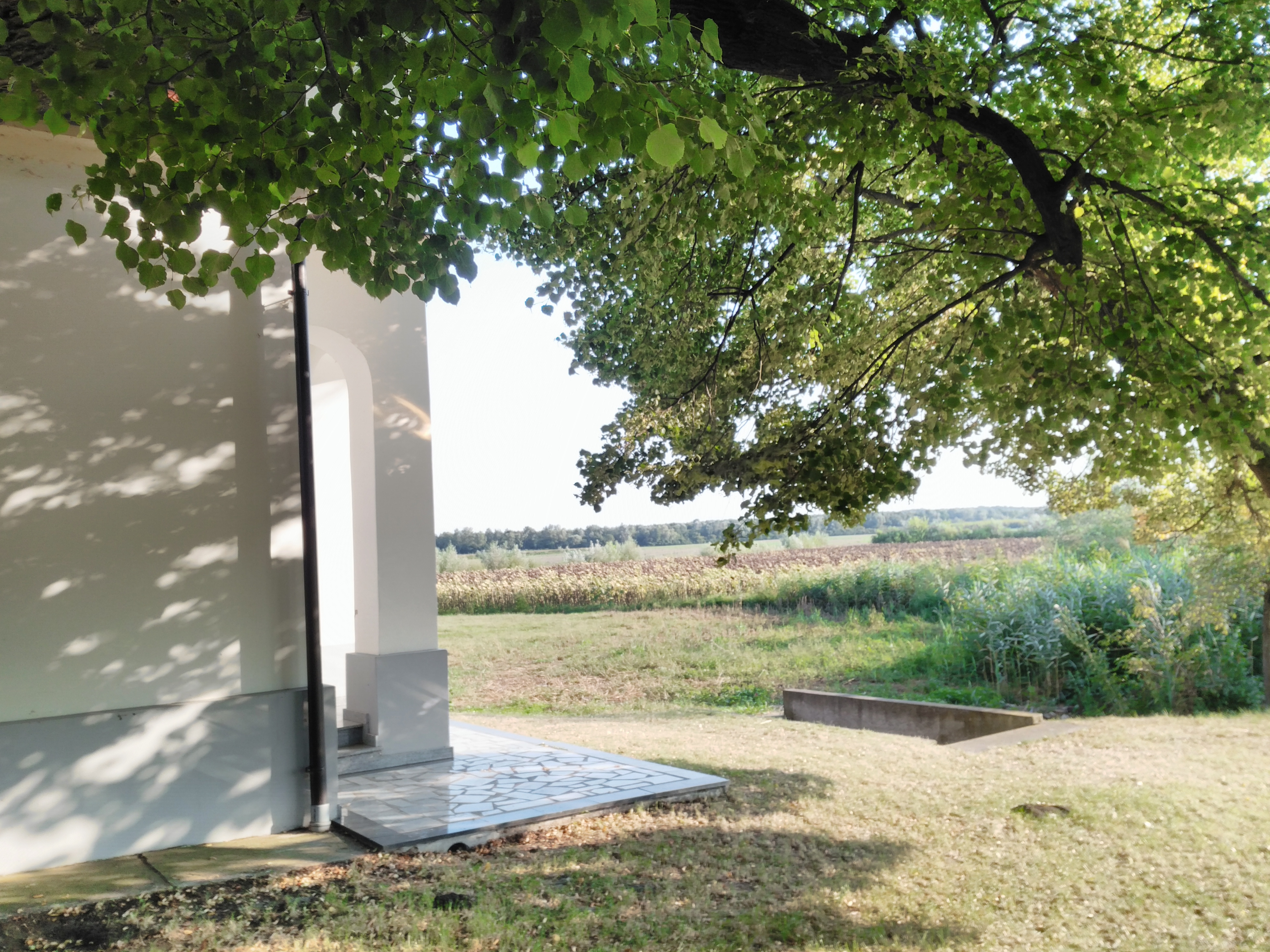
View of the field

== See also ==
- List of Serbian Orthodox churches in Croatia
- Eparchy of Osijek Plain and Baranya
- Serbs of Croatia
