= Šarengrad =

- Village (Selo)
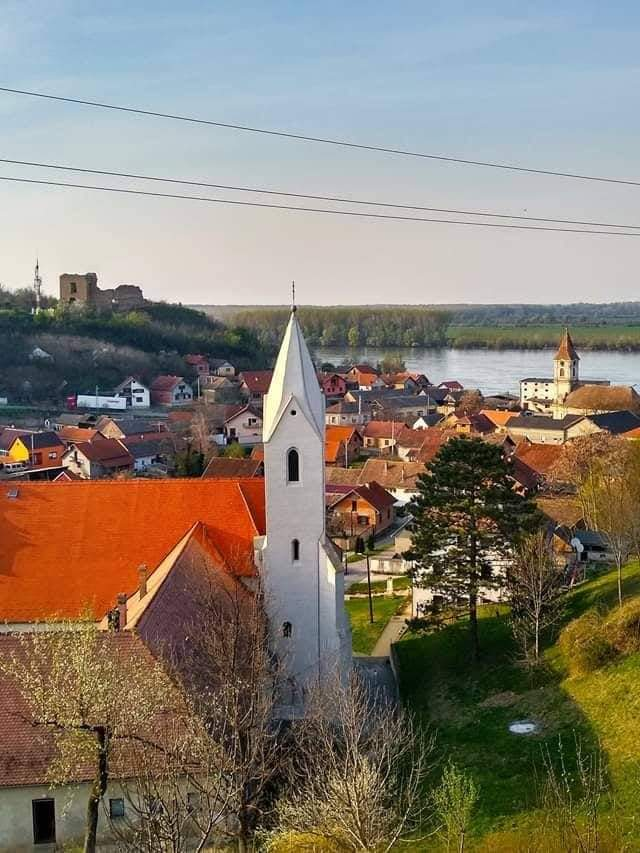
- Šarengrad

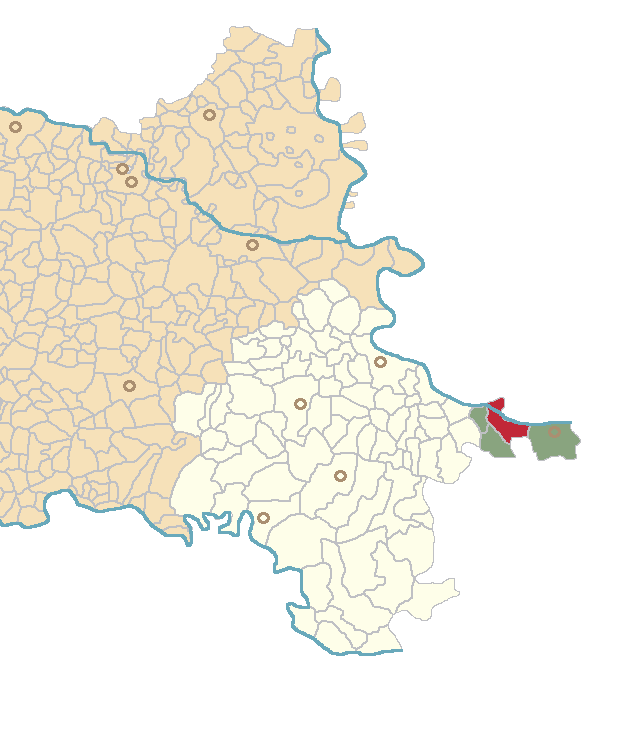

- Location within Vukovar-Syrmia County Location within Croatia Location within Europe
- Coordinates: 45°13′52″N 19°16′48″E
- Country: Croatia
- Region: Syrmia (Podunavlje)
- County: Vukovar-Syrmia
- Municipality: Ilok

Area
  - Total: 33.3 km^{2} (12.9 sq mi)
- Elevation: 92 m (302 ft)

Population (2021)
  - Total: 362
  - Density: 10.9/km^{2} (28.2/sq mi)
- Demonym(s): Šarengrađanin (♂) Šarengrađanka (♀) (per grammatical gender)
- Time zone: UTC+1 (CET)
  - Summer (DST): UTC+2 (CEST)
- Postal code: 32234 Šarengrad
- Area code: +385 0(32)

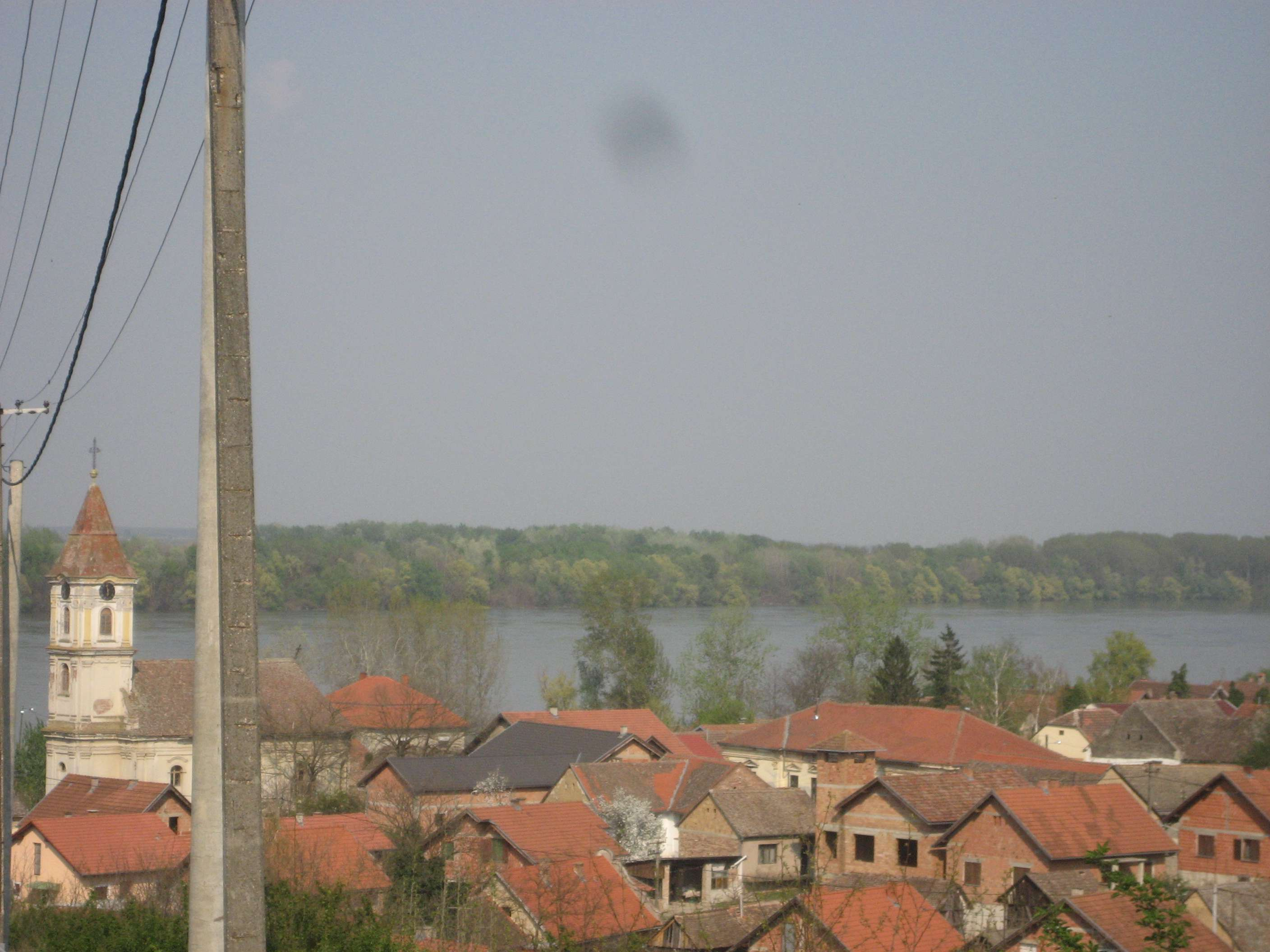
Šarengrad, Danube

Šarengrad (Serbian Cyrillic: Шаренград, Hungarian: Atya, German: Wetterwardein) is a village in eastern Croatia. It is located along the Danube river and is administratively part of Croatian easternmost town of Ilok. Šarengrad is known for its landscape which is dominated by the river and picturesque houses and church tower next to it. Island of Šarengrad is an 9 km^{2} river island situated close to the village.

== History ==
Following Ottoman retreat from the region, the Lordship of Vukovar was established, and the village became part of its domain.

On 1 March 1974, President of Yugoslavia Josip Broz Tito, accompanied by his wife Jovanka Broz, visited the village of Šarengrad while taking a short holiday in nearby Karađorđevo in Vojvodina on the advice of his doctors. The visit was marked by a warm welcome from the residents.

== Geography ==
The village is located in the Syrmia region, on the Fruška Gora slopes, next to the Danube river.

== Demographics ==
Settlement of Šarengrad: Population trends 1857–2021
v

population	1265	1484	1424	1558	1489	1472	1392	1448	1349	1622	1443	1357	1106	1005	838	528	362
	1857	1869	1880	1890	1900	1910	1921	1931	1948	1953	1961	1971	1981	1991	2001	2011	2021

Sources: Croatian Bureau of Statistics publications

=== 1991 census ===
Šarengrad
1991
total: 1,005
1. Croats 904 (90.0%)
2. Serbs 48 (4.77%)
3. Slovaks 7 (0.69%)
4. Yugoslavs 6 (0.59%)
5. Hungarians 4 (0.39%)
6. Muslims 3 (0.29%)
7. Slovenes 2 (0.19%)
8. Germans 1 (0.09%)
9. Macedonians 1 (0.09%)
10. Montenegrins 1 (0.09%)
11. others 2 (0.19%)
12. nondeclared 10 (0.99%)
13. unknown 16 (1.59%)

=== 1910 census ===
According to the 1910 census, settlement of Šarengrad had 1,472 inhabitants (in the main settlement Šarengrad 1,330 and in hamlets: Bjelica 47 and Šarengradska Dobra Voda 95), which were linguistically and religiously declared as this:

Šarengrad
Population by language	Population by religion
total: 1,472: 1. Croatian 1,008 (68.5%); 2. Serbian 232 (15.8%); 3. Hungarian 117 (7.94%); 4. German 75 (5.09%); 5. Rusyn 17 (1.15%); 6. Slovak 12 (0.81%); 7. Czech 1 (0.06%); 8. Romanian 1 (0.06%); 9. others 9 (0.61%)	total: 1,472: 1. Rom. Cath. 1,188 (80.7%); 2. East. Orthodox 242 (16.4%); 3. East. Catholics 20 (1.35%); 4. Calvinists 12 (0.81%); 5. Jewish 8 (0.54%); 6. Lutherans 2 (0.13%)

== Gallery ==
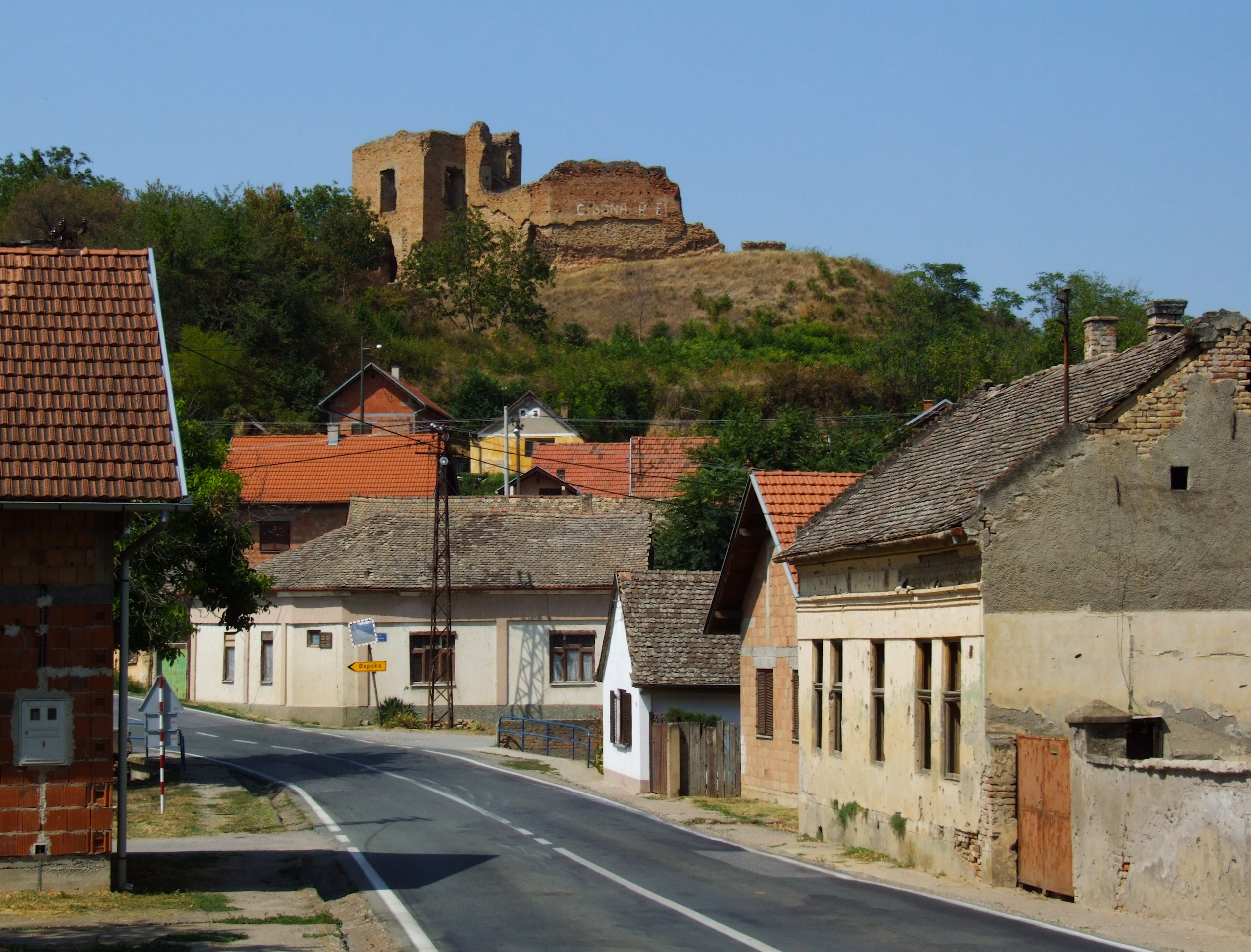
Main D2 road

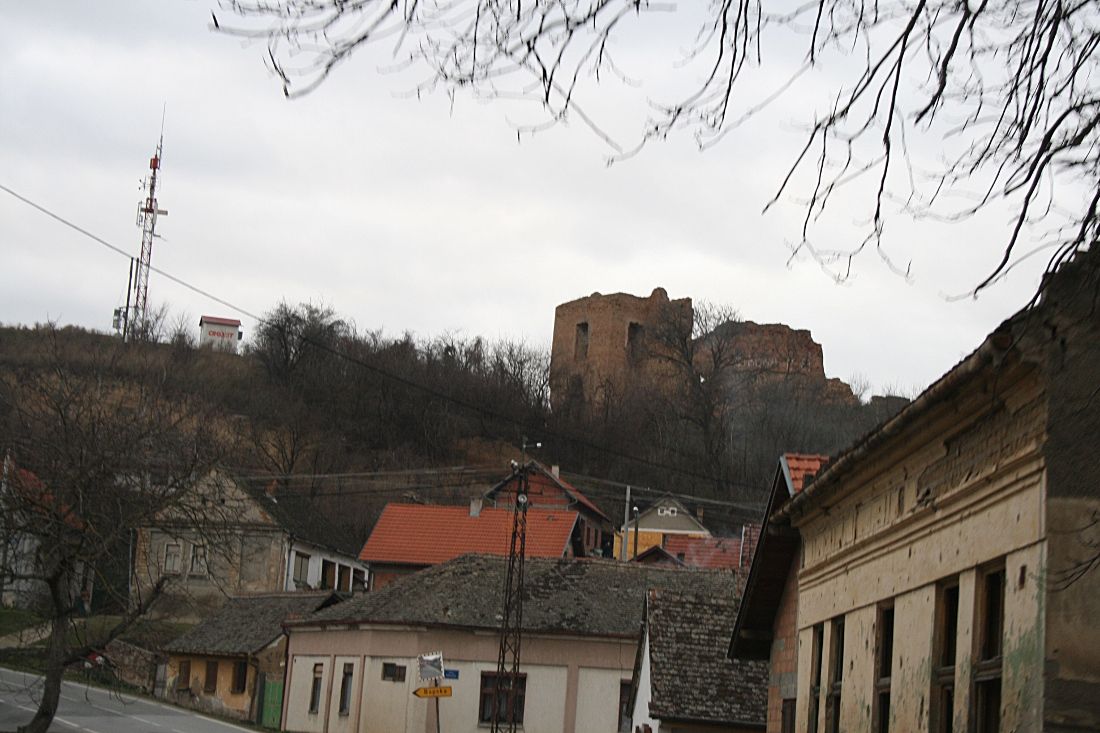

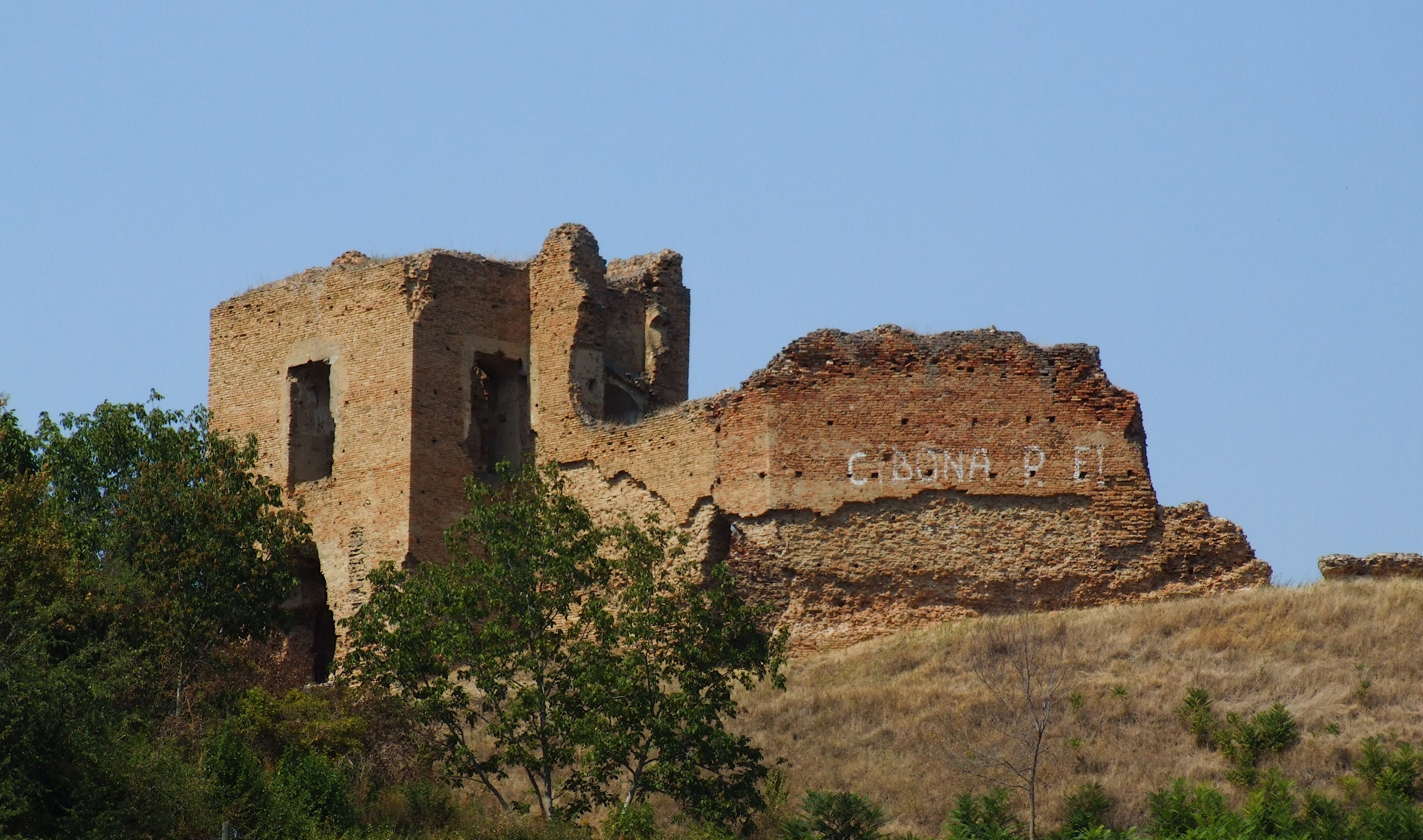
Medieval castle

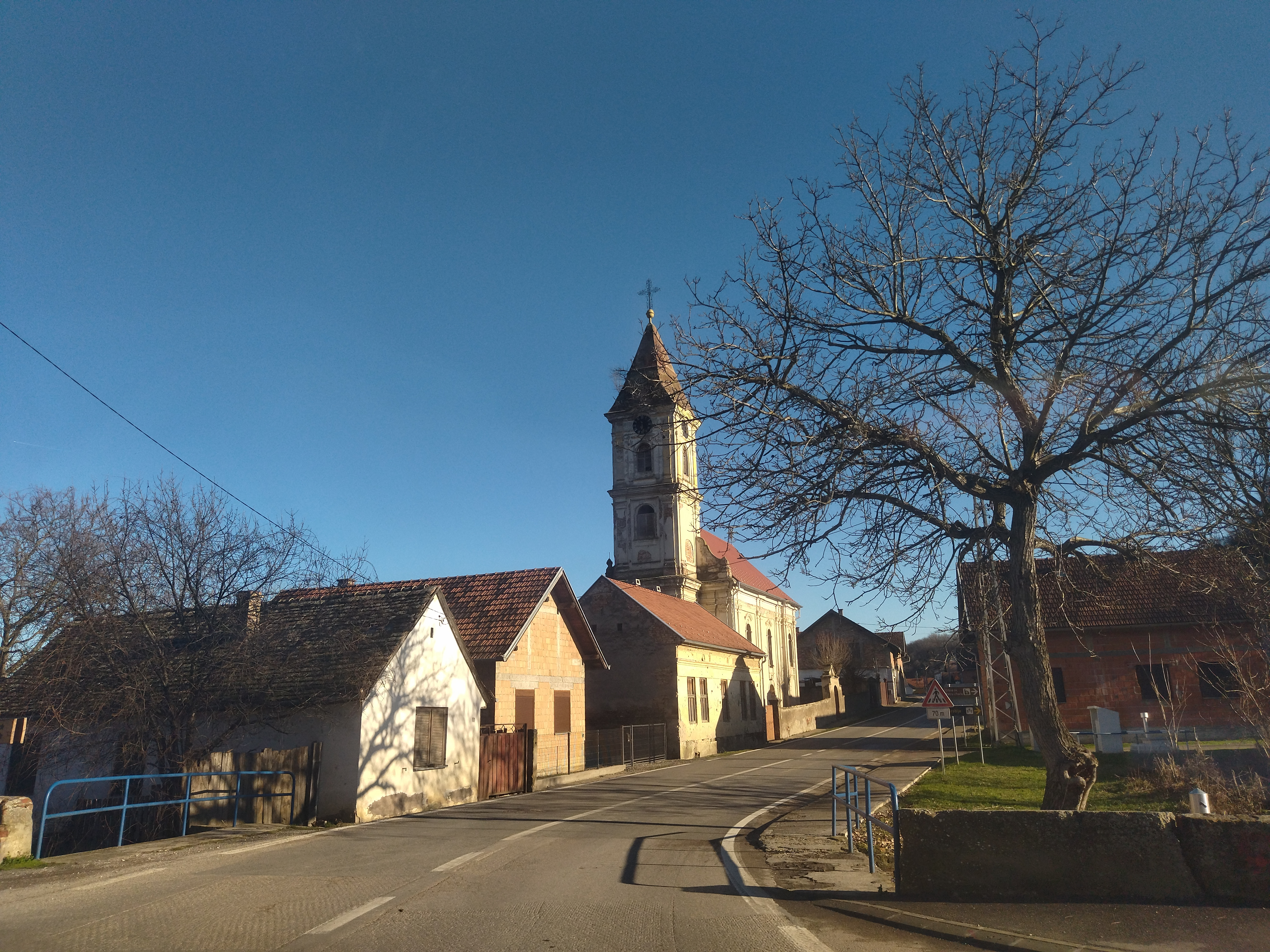
Serbian orthodox Church of the Transfiguration of the Lord

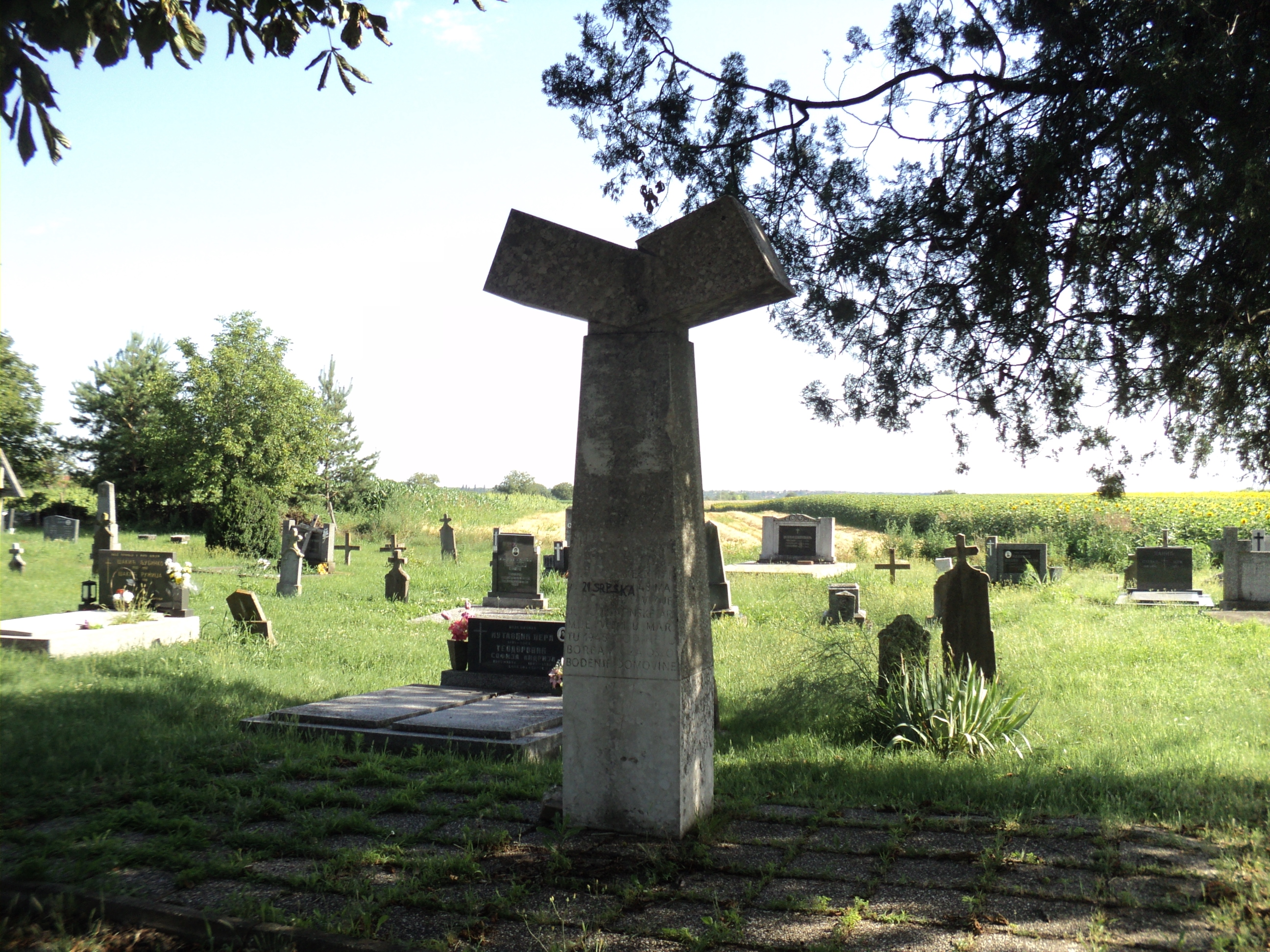
Yugoslav Partisans cemetery

== See also ==
- Island of Šarengrad
- Church of the Transfiguration of the Lord, Šarengrad
