= Ambassadors' Alley =

Memorial street in Sarajevo, Bosnia and Herzegovina

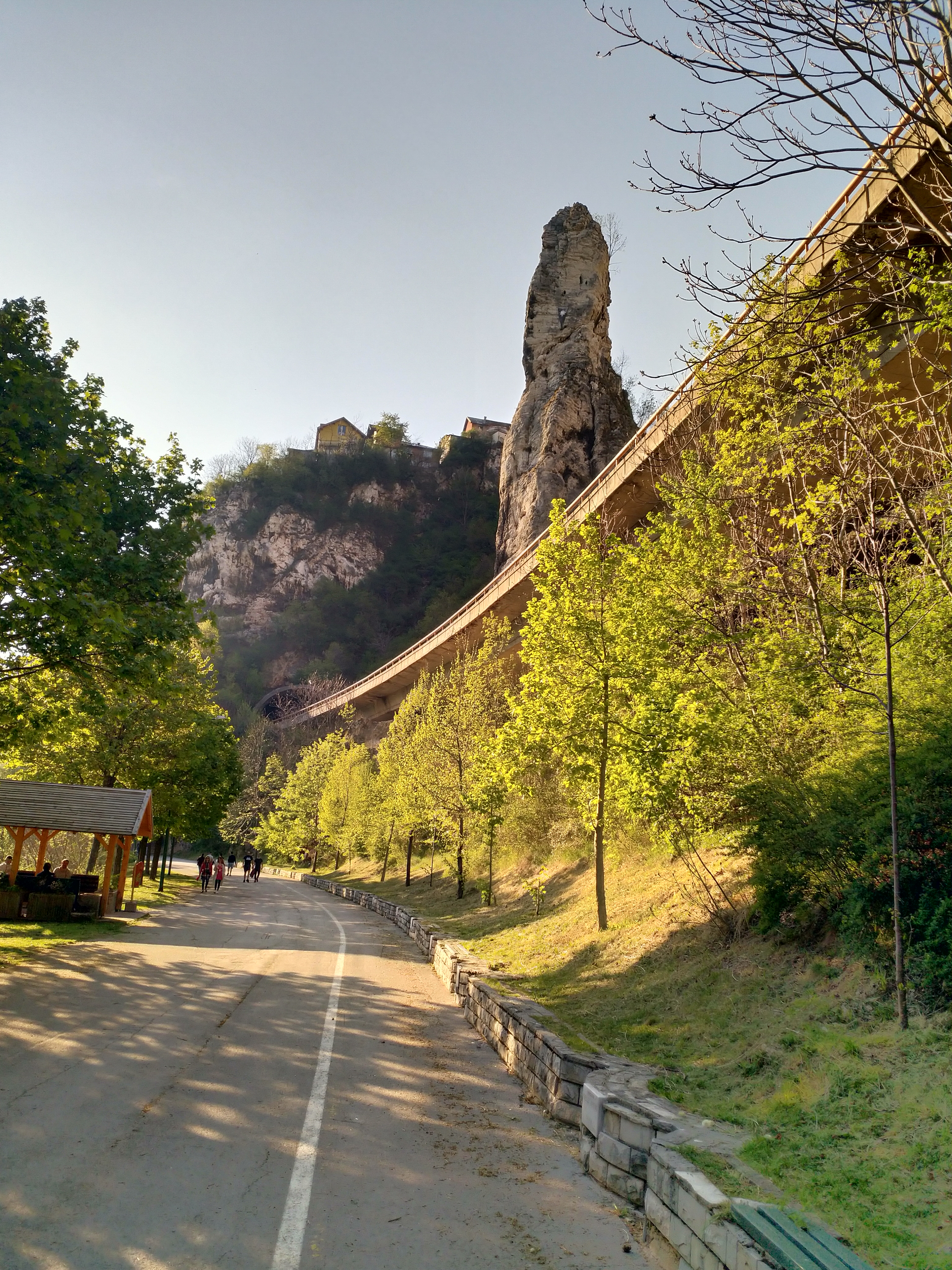
- Ambassadors' Alley in 2020
- Interactive map of Ambassadors' Alley
- Native name: Aleja ambasadora (Bosnian)
- Location: Sarajevo
- Coordinates: 43°51′30.99″N 18°26′29.96″E

Construction
- Inauguration: 2002

Ambassadors' Alley (Bosnian: Aleja Ambasadora) is a linden tree alley located at the popular pedestrian stretch Bentbaša-Dariva along the river Miljacka in Sarajevo, Bosnia and Herzegovina. It is a project in which ambassadors, serving in Bosnia and Herzegovina as high officials of their representative countries or major international organizations, get an opportunity to plant a linden tree during their mission and in front of every planted linden tree, a stone plate is installed containing the ambassador's name, country or international organization that represents.

As of January 2025, the full number of planted trees and placed stone plates is 238.

== History ==
Ambassadors' Alley was established in 2002 and the first linden tree was planted by the former High Representative Wolfgang Petritsch, and the second one by Jacques Paul Klein, the former Head of the United Nations Mission in Bosnia and Herzegovina.

After planting, project participants are presented with certificates.

== Reconstruction ==
Since the plaques with the names of the ambassadors are a constant target of vandals, in 2018 the reconstruction of public lighting was done, as well as the installation of lighting under the boards with the names of the ambassadors.
