= Church of the Dormition of the Theotokos, Negoslavci =

Serbian Orthodox church in Negoslavci, Croatia

Church of the Dormition of the Theotokos
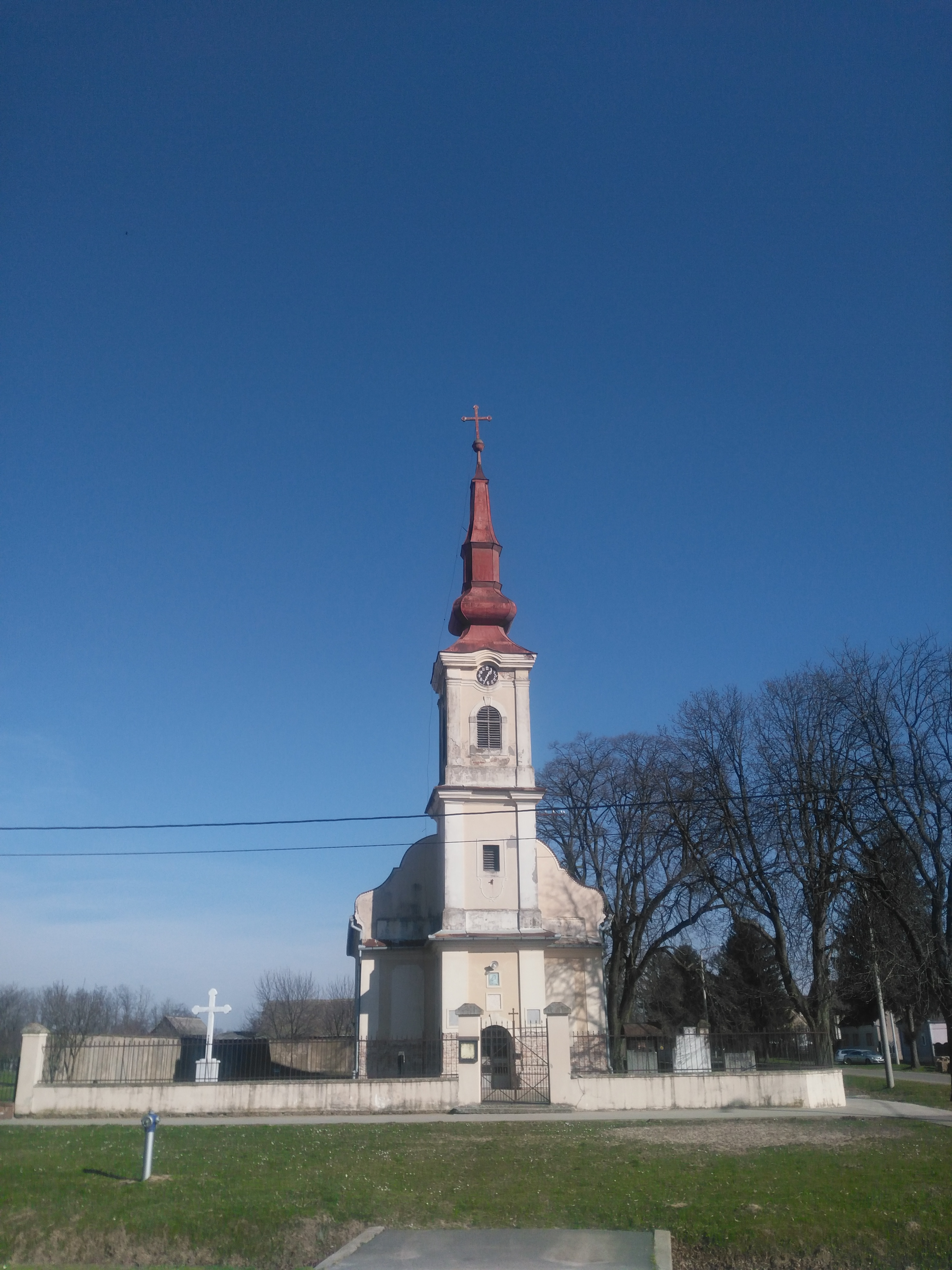
- Church of the Dormition of the Theotokos
- Church of the Dormition of the Theotokos
- 45°16′42.5″N 18°59′53″E
- Location: Vukovarska 28; 32 239 Negoslavci; Vukovar-Syrmia County
- Country: Croatia
- Denomination: Serbian Orthodox

History
- Dedication: Dormition of the Theotokos

Architecture
- Style: Baroque and Classicism

Administration
- Archdiocese: Eparchy of Osijek Plain and Baranya

Church of the Dormition of the Theotokos (Serbian: Црква Успења Пресвете Богородице/Crkva Uspenja Presvete Bogorodice) in Negoslavci is Serbian Orthodox church in eastern Croatia. The church is dedicated to the Dormition of the Theotokos. Beside the church is new parish house. The building and its inventory are separately listed in Register of Cultural Goods of Croatia. The construction activities were completed in 1757.

== Photo gallery ==
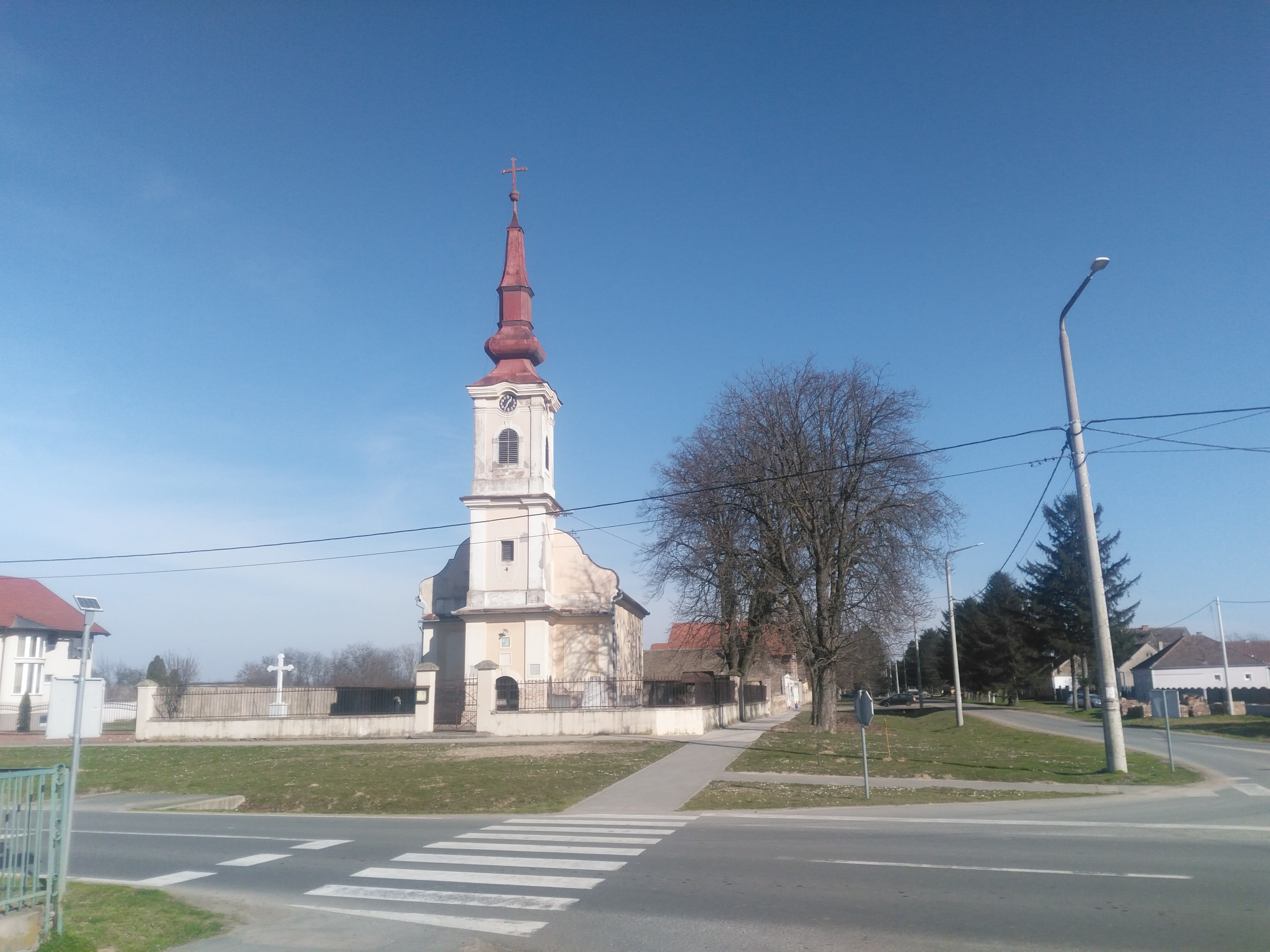
Photo of the church

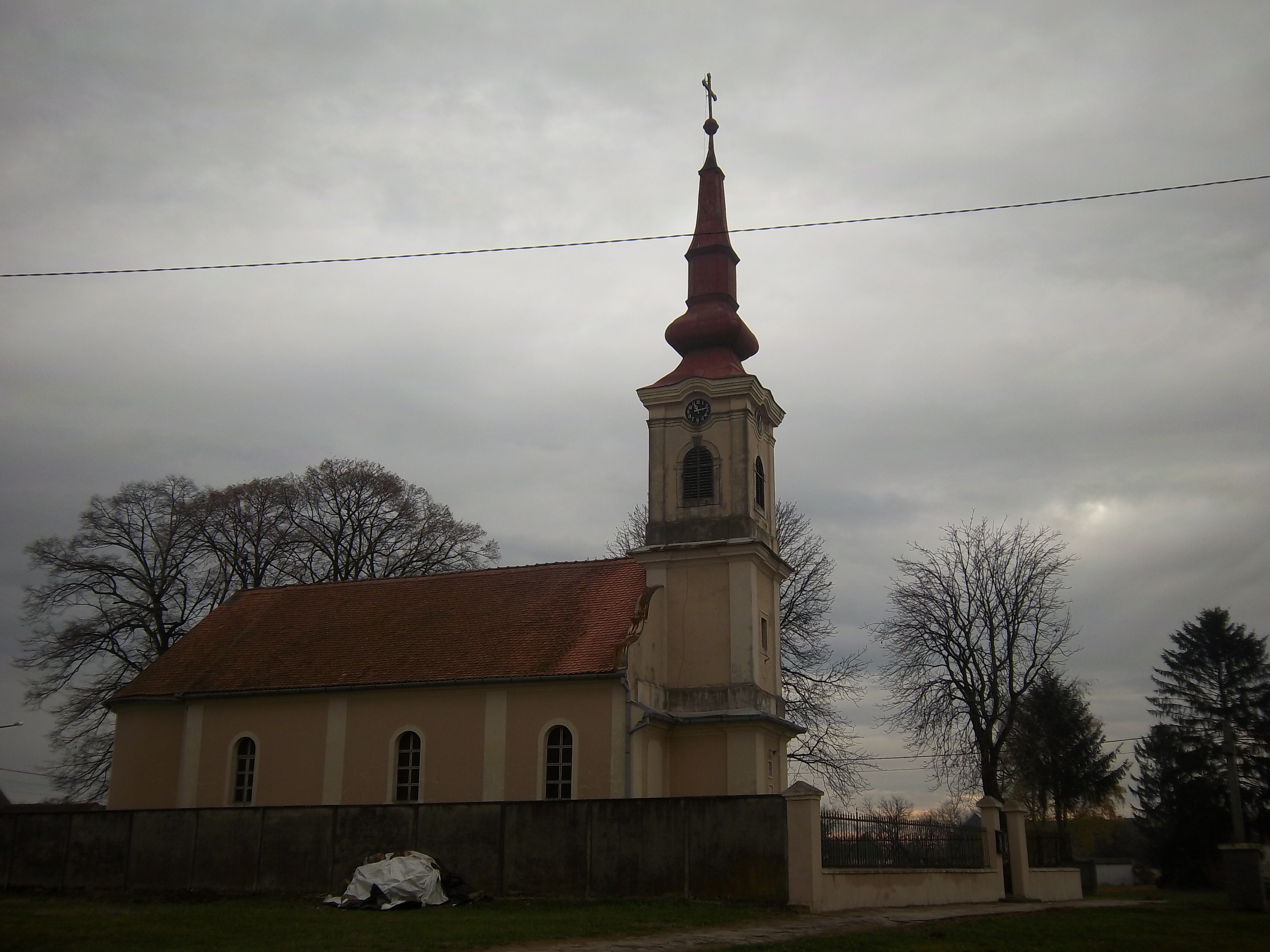
Photo of the church

== See also ==
- List of Serbian Orthodox churches in Croatia
- Eparchy of Osijek Plain and Baranya
- Serbs of Croatia

== Sources ==
- Mileusnić, Slobodan (1997). Spiritual Genocide: A survey of destroyed, damaged and desecrated churches, monasteries and other church buildings during the war 1991-1995 (1997). Belgrade: Museum of the Serbian Orthodox Church.
