= Church of St. Nicholas, Mirkovci =

Serbian Orthodox church in Mirkovci, Croatia

Church of St. Nicholas
- Crkva svetog Nikole; Hram svetog Nikole / Храм светог Николе
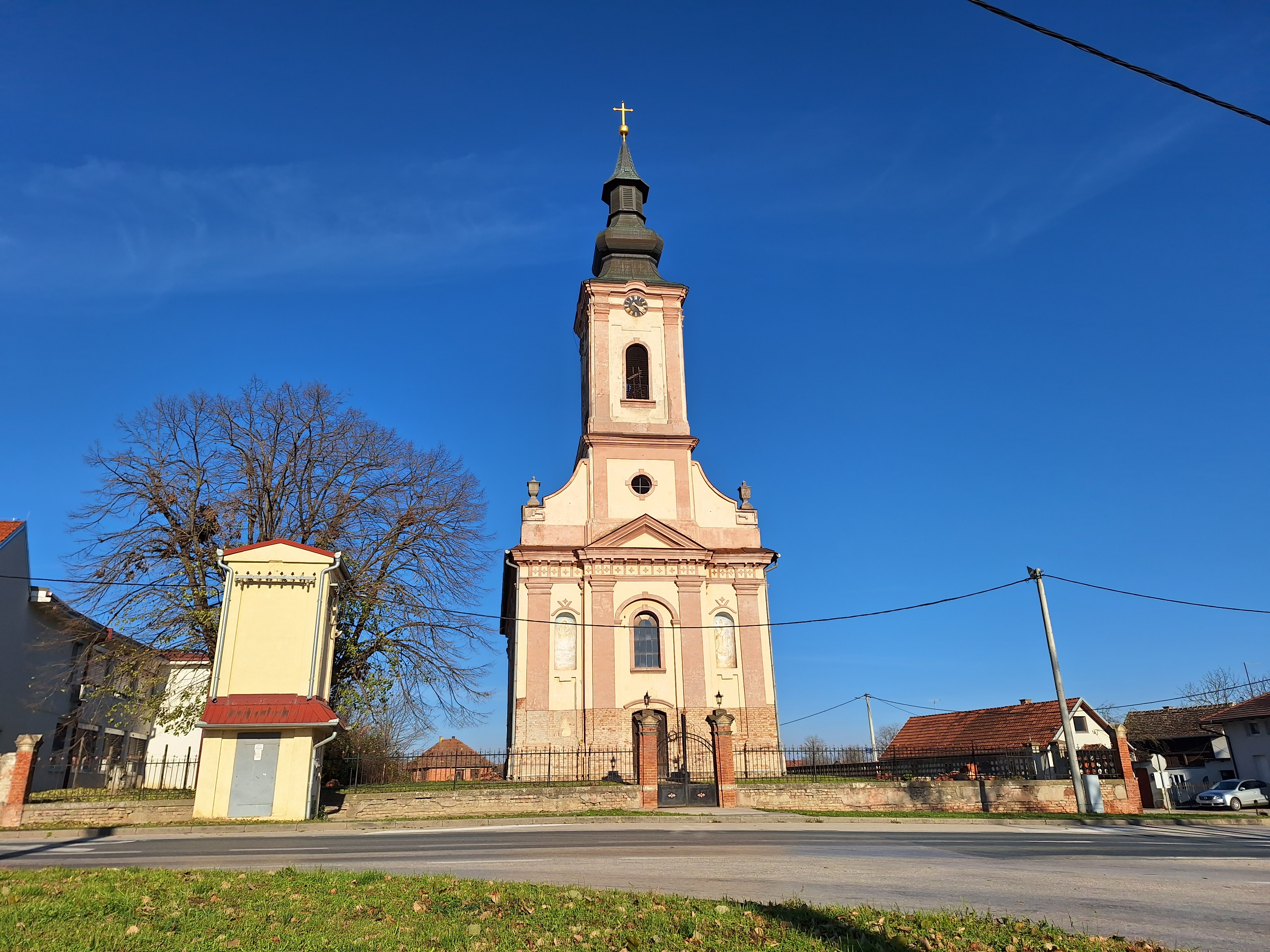
- Church of St Nicholas
- Church of St. Nicholas
- 45°16′16″N 18°51′2″E
- Location: Mirkovci, Vukovar-Syrmia County
- Country: Croatia
- Denomination: Serbian Orthodox

History
- Status: Church
- Dedication: St. Nicholas

Architecture
- Functional status: Active
- Architect: Mihael Mazinger
- Style: Baroque
- Years built: 1804-1813

Administration
- Archdiocese: Eparchy of Osijek Plain and Baranya

Church of St. Nicholas (Croatian: Crkva svetog Nikole, Serbian: Hram svetog Nikole, Храм светог Николе) in Mirkovci is a Serbian Orthodox church in eastern Croatia.

The church was constructed in period between 1804 and 1813. It was reconstructed three times in the 20th century, firstly in 1912 during Austria-Hungary, then in 1975 in Socialist Federal Republic of Yugoslavia, and finally in 1993 during the Croatian War of Independence when Mirkovci were part of self-proclaimed Eastern Slavonia, Baranja, and Western Syrmia. The last reconstruction in 1993 followed war damages from 1991 when the church tower was destroyed and the roof structure collapsed.

In March 2013 the church's wall was vandalized with an engraving of fascist Ustashe symbol. The same incident happened again next month, this time with the inscription in lacquer spray.

== See also ==
- List of Serbian Orthodox churches in Croatia
- Eparchy of Osijek Plain and Baranya
- Serbs of Croatia
