= Cathedral of the Transfiguration of the Lord, Zagreb =

Serbian Orthodox cathedral in Zagreb, Croatia

Cathedral of the Transfiguration of the Lord
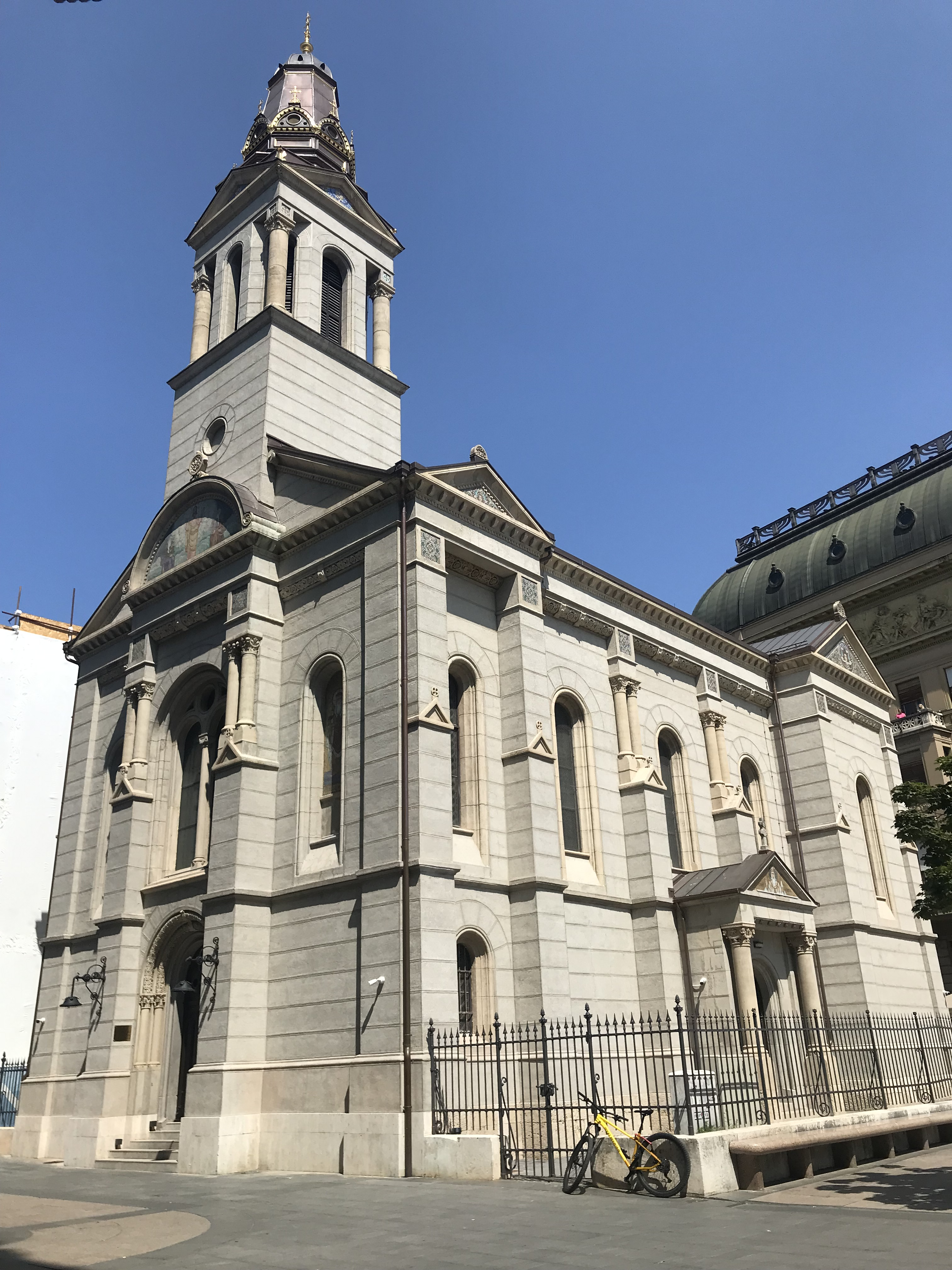
- Cathedral of the Transfiguration of the Lord, pictured in 2025
- Cathedral of the Transfiguration of the Lord
- 45°48′46″N 15°58′26″E
- Location: Zagreb
- Country: Croatia
- Denomination: Serbian Orthodox Church

History
- Former name(s): Church of Sts. Peter and Paul (in 1794)
- Status: Church
- Dedication: Transfiguration of the Lord

Architecture
- Functional status: Active
- Architect(s): Franjo Klein and Hermann Bollé
- Style: Historicist interpretation of Romanesque and Byzantine architecture

Administration
- Division

Cultural Good of Croatia
- Type: Protected cultural good
- Reference no.: Z-456
- Archdiocese: Metropolitanate of Zagreb and Ljubljana

The Cathedral of the Transfiguration of the Lord (Serbian: Саборна црква Преображења Господњег; Croatian: Saborna crkva Preobraženja Gospodnjeg), also known as the Zagreb Orthodox Cathedral, is an Eastern Orthodox church located in Zagreb, Croatia. It is under jurisdiction of the Metropolitanate of Zagreb and Ljubljana of the Serbian Orthodox Church and serves as its cathedral church.

== History ==
A wooden Catholic church dedicated to St. Marguerite was located on the place of the modern day cathedral in the 14th century. The church was restored in the 16th and 17th century. Between 1372 and the 19th century, the annual St. Marguerite fair was organized on the square. In the 18th century the church was burned down in a fire and in its place a new one was built with bulbous steeple.

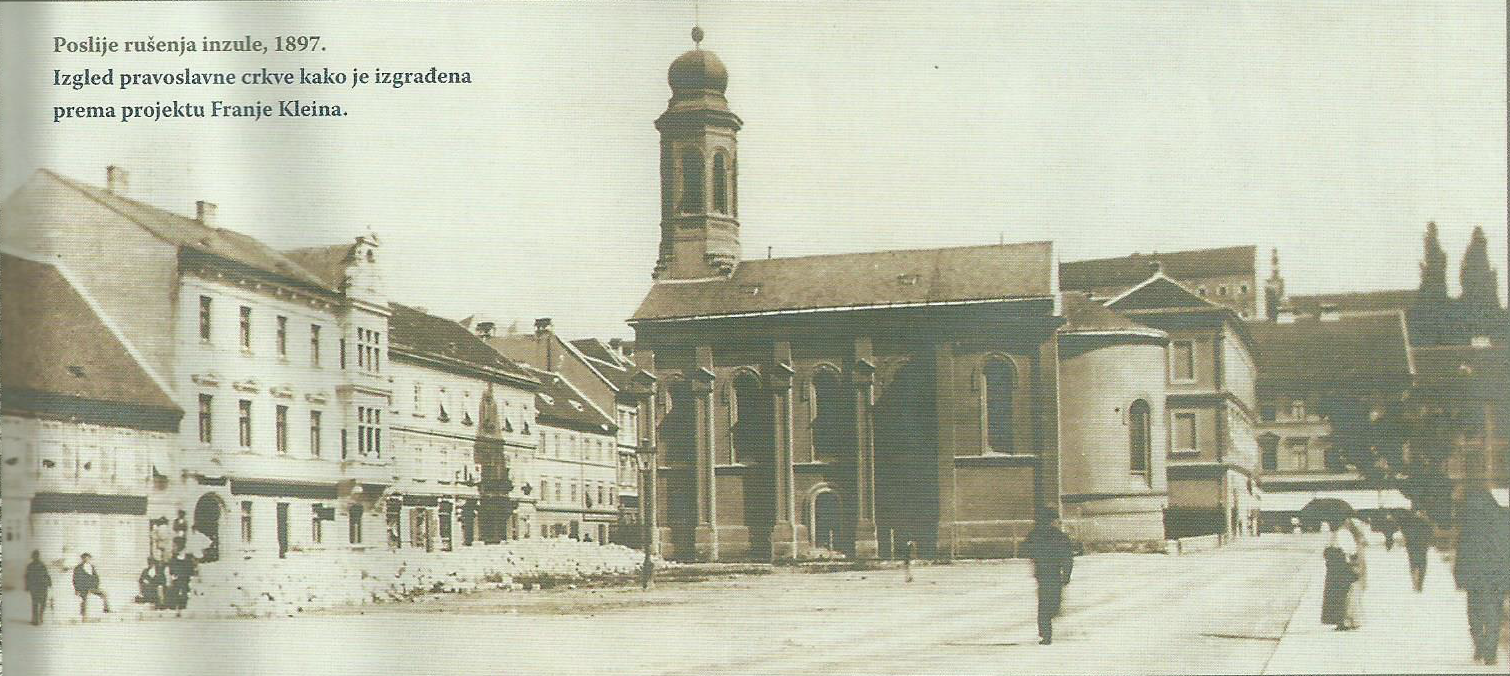
Cathedral in 1861

Duding the Josephinism period the state implemented significant reforms that affected life of religious communities. In 1781 Patent of Toleration extended religious freedom to non-Catholic Christians living in Habsburg lands and was followed by 1782 Edict of Tolerance. By city government decision the old church was offered at auction and sold to the Zagreb Croatian Orthodox Parish for 4,000 florins. In 1848, during Revolutions of 1848, the Orthodox Parish added the suffix Serbian in its name since by that time the Serbs (under the autonomous Patriarchate of Karlovci) significantly outnumbered local Greeks and Aromanians.

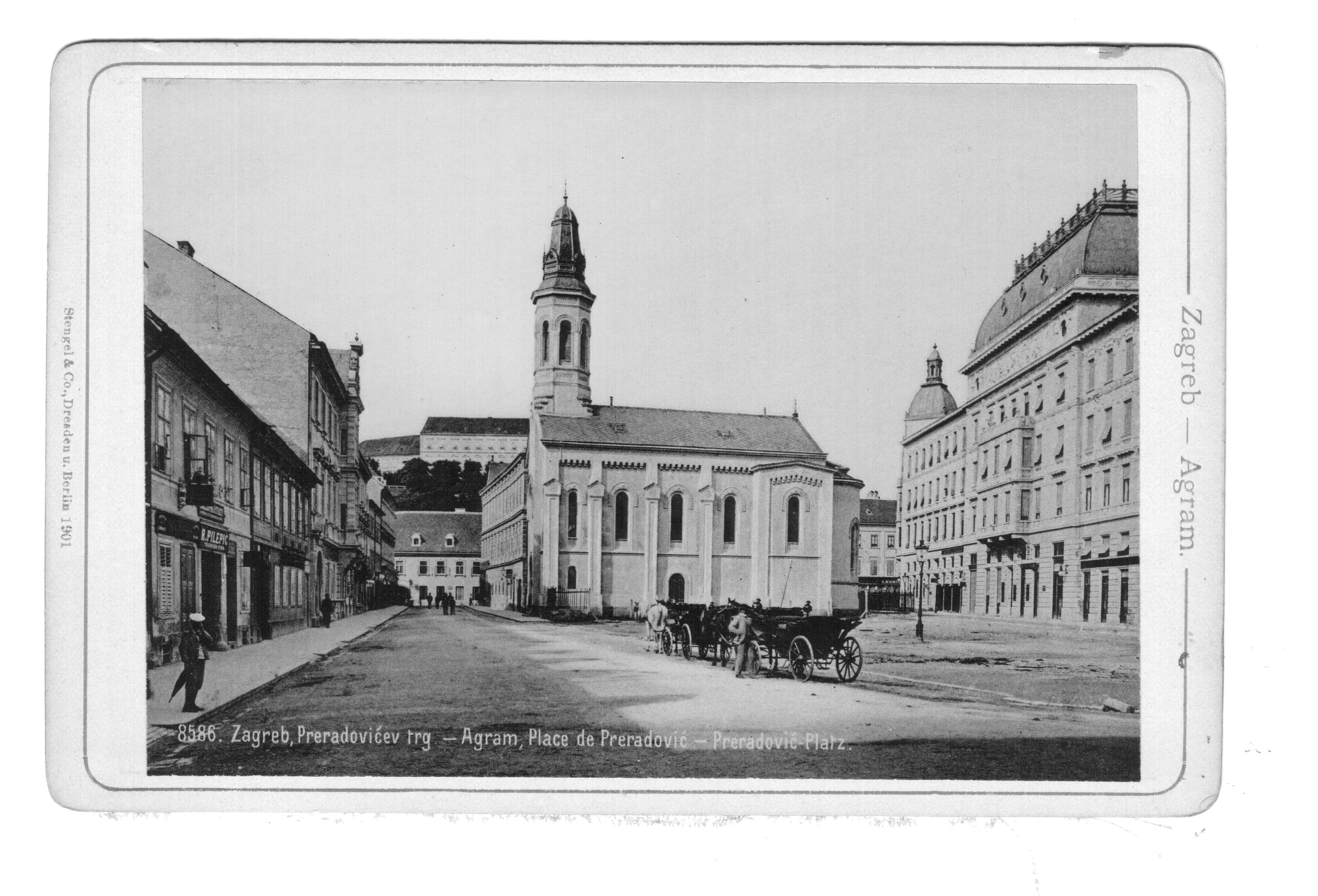
Cathedral in 1901

In 1861 initiative was launched to build new church on the site of a dilapidated old St. Marguerite church. Project was awarded to the architect Franjo Klein. In the same period when the Cathedral of the Transfiguration of the Lord was built, Zagreb Synagogue was also built according to the Franjo Klein project. Church was completed on 21 October 1866, and synagogue on 27 September 1867.

In 1897, after completion of urbanization of square south to the church, architect Hermann Bollé proposed plan of monumental reorganization of church. This plan was never implemented, but the same architect developed a plan for restoration of bell tower in its modern-day shape in 1899, and in 1913 based on his plan façade was restored. In 1931 the Metropolitanate of Zagreb was established and the church became its Cathedral.

During World War II collaborationist Croatian Ustaše regime of Independent State of Croatia seized all property Serbian Orthodox Church and determined that the cathedral would be the central church of Croatian Orthodox Church, which was a part of the widespread Genocide of Serbs in the Independent State of Croatia.

Following the 2020 Zagreb earthquake, the cathedral underwent reconstruction due to major damage that occurred.

== Architecture ==
The iconostasis was placed in front of the altar in 1795. This iconostasis was donated to Church of St. George in Varaždin in 1884 when the current iconostasis was built. The iconostasis of the Orthodox Cathedral comprises a total of 34 icons and 4 free-standing walnut pillars. The Metropolitan Jovan Pavlović, who reigned from 1982 to 2014 was buried in the cathedral after his death in 2014.

== Gallery ==
Frontal view

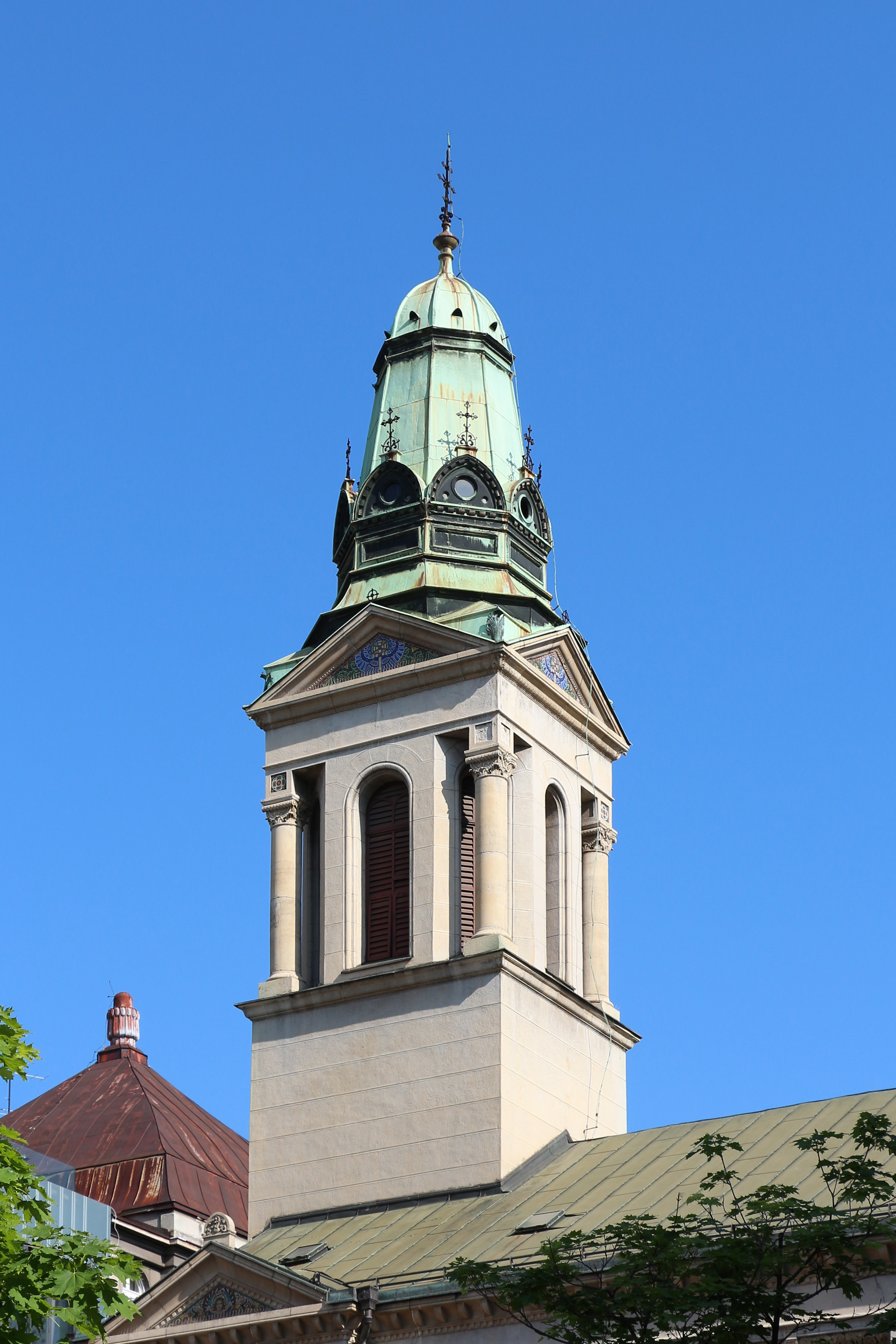
Dome

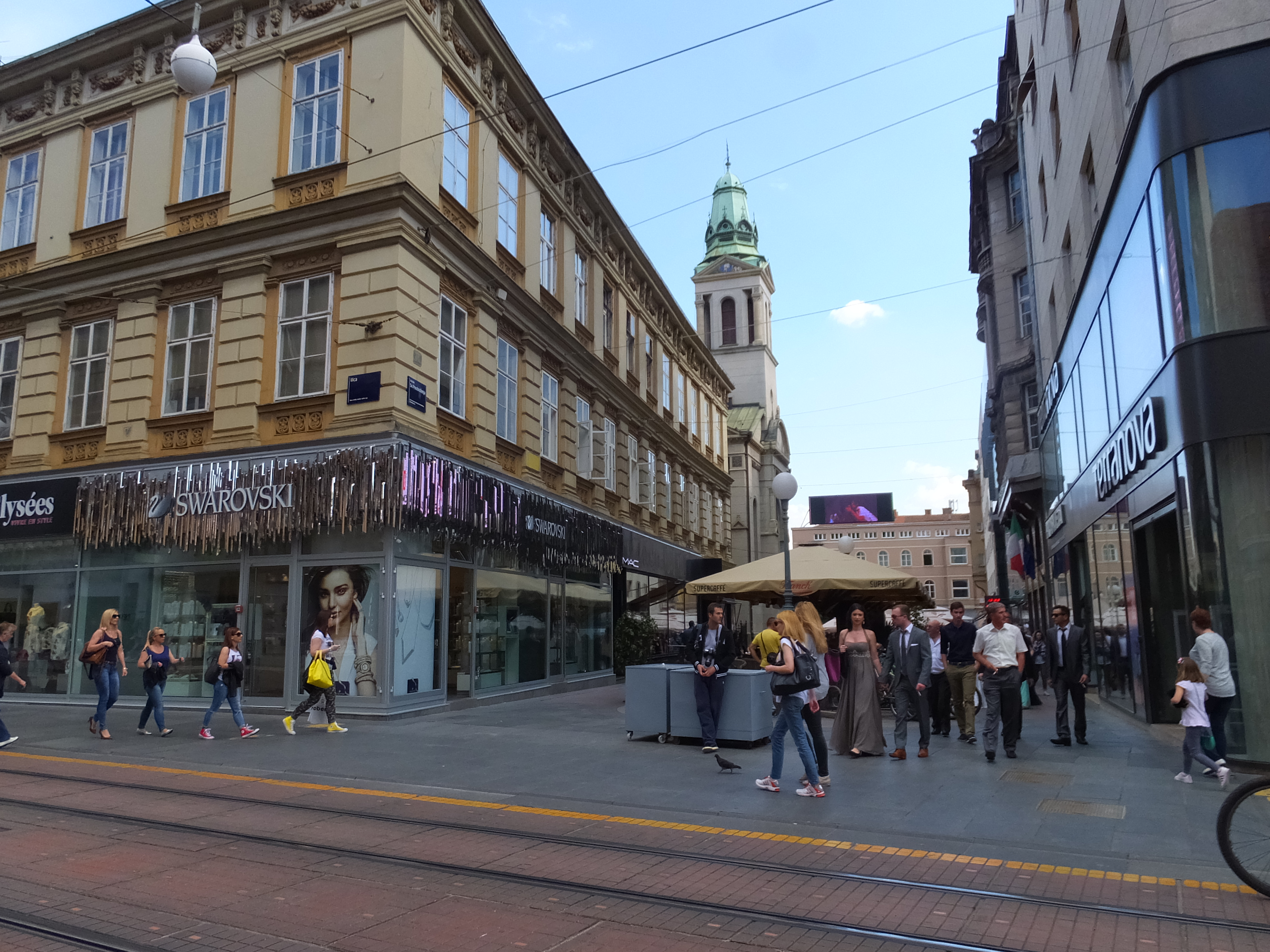
View from Ilica
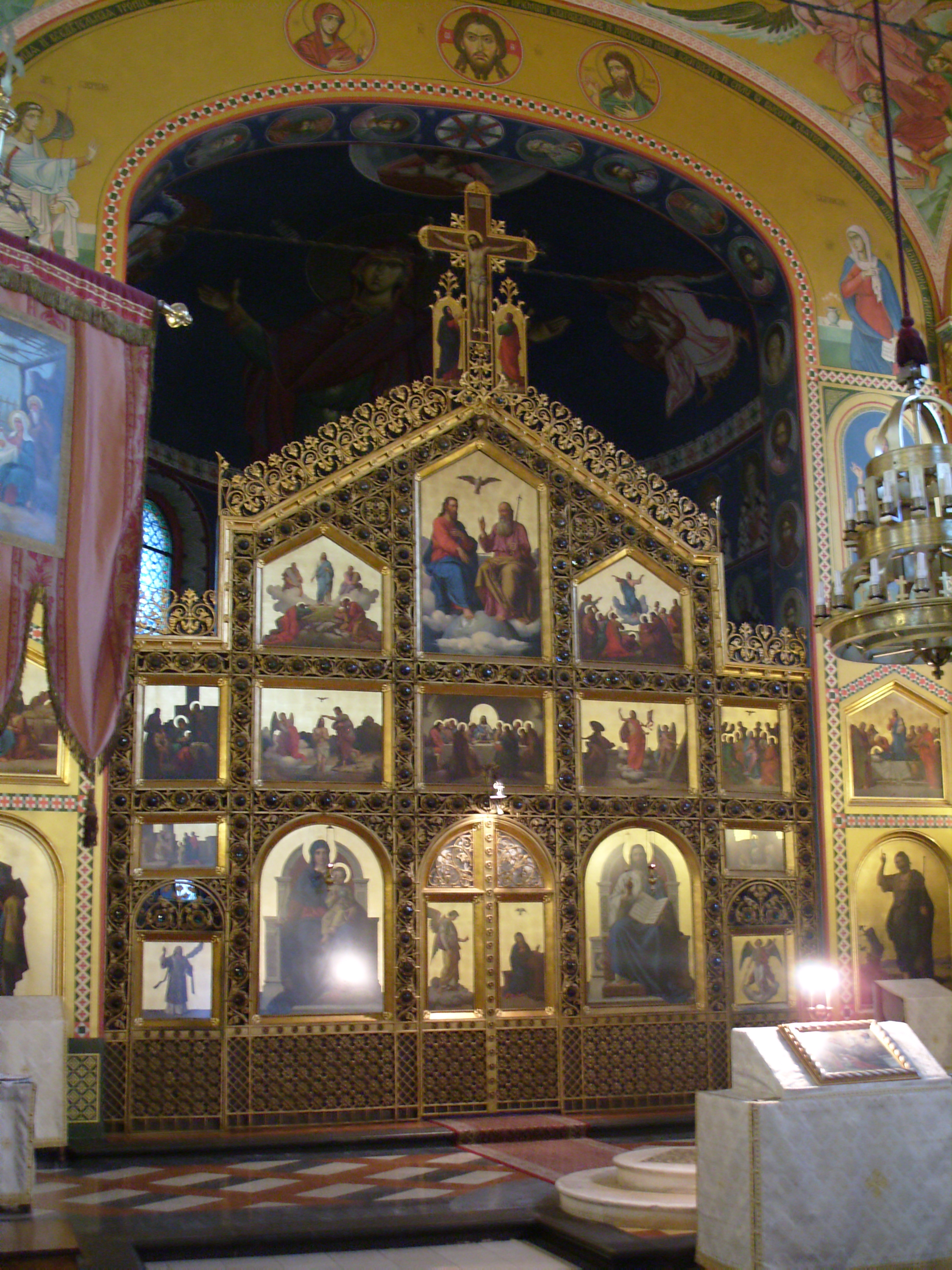
Iconostasis

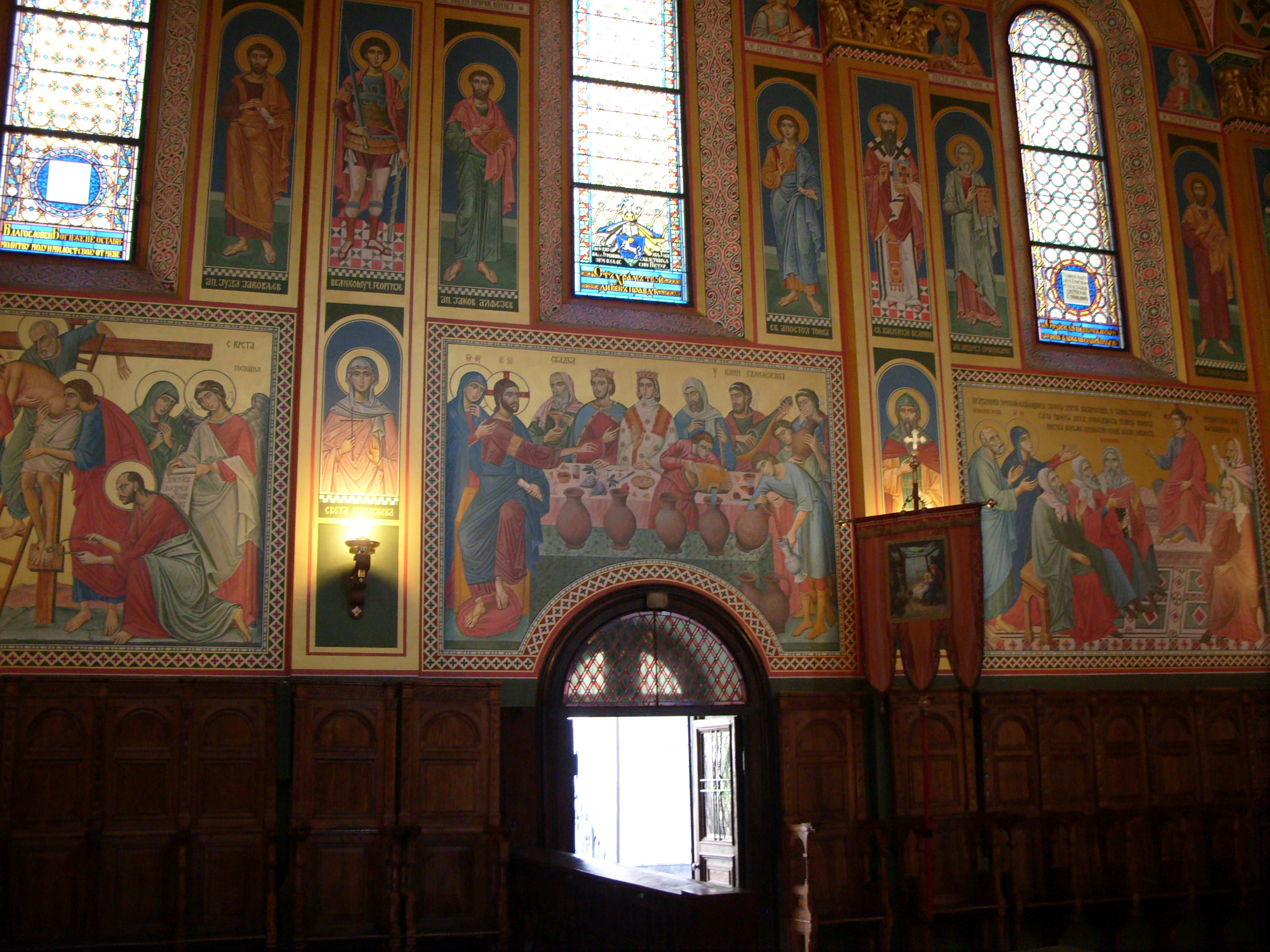
Frescos

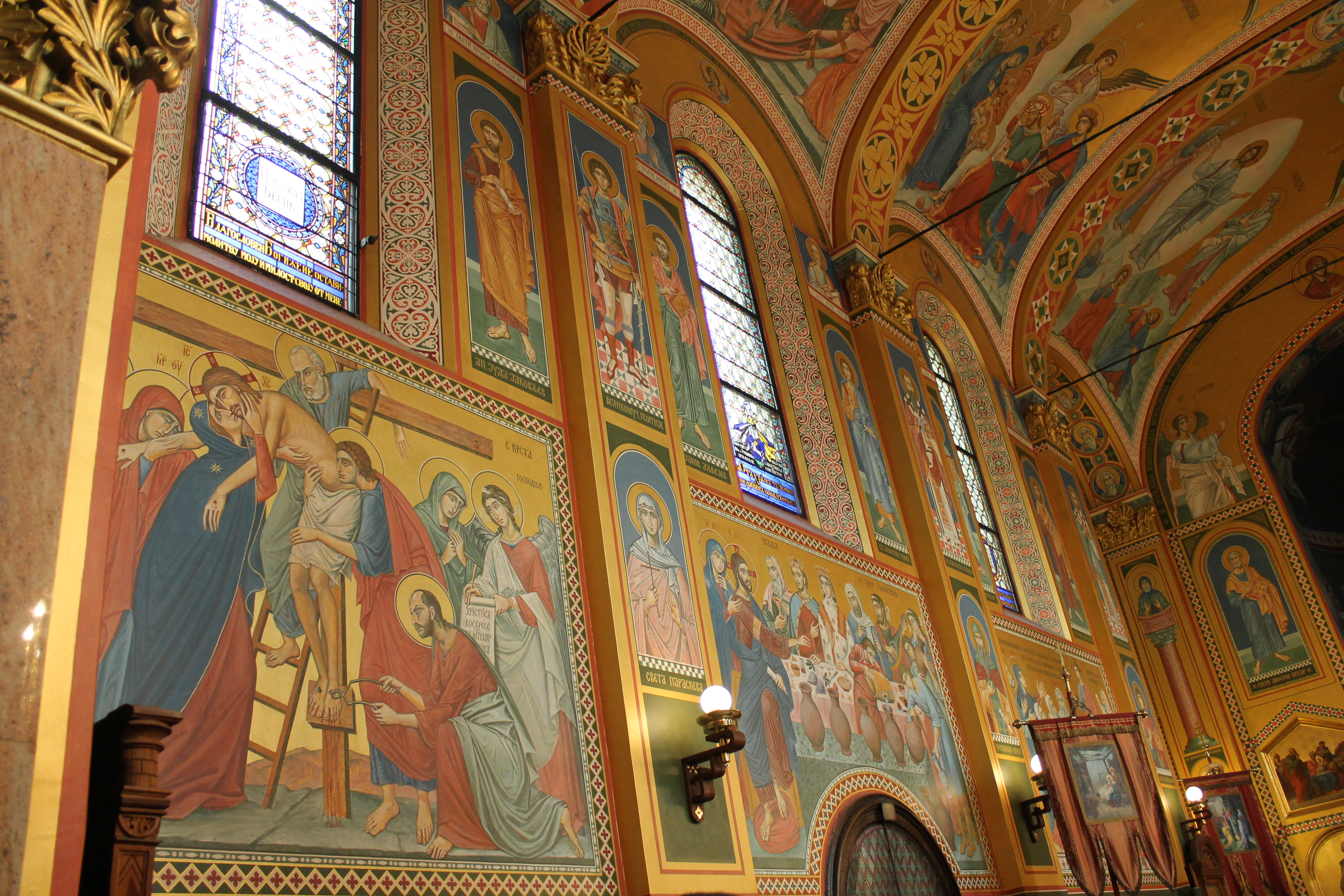
Frescos

== See also ==
- List of Serbian Orthodox churches in Croatia
- Serbs of Zagreb
- Serbs of Croatia

== Bibliography ==
- Преображени храм (Живопис храма Св. Преображења Господњег у Загребу)-Храм преображенный (Роснись храма св. Преображенуя Господня б Загребе)-Transfigured church (Fresgues of the church of St. Transfiguration of the Lord in Zagreb), Irina Buseva Davidova and Dragan Damjanović, Zagreb 2008, trilingual publication in Serbian, Russian and English, NSK CIP 673785
