= Metropolitanate of Zagreb and Ljubljana =

Diocese of the Serbian Orthodox Church

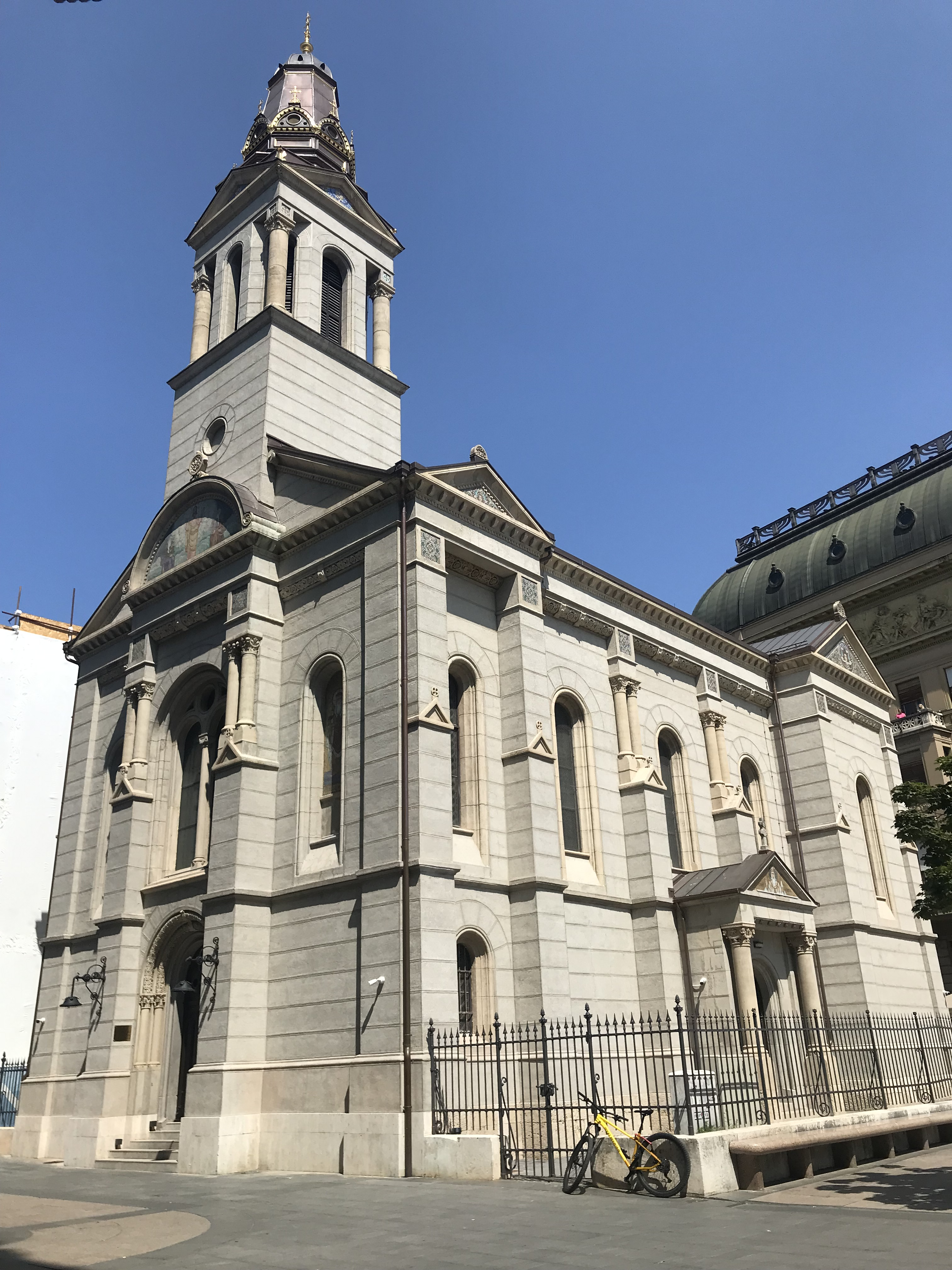
- Cathedral of the Transfiguration of the Lord, Zagreb

Location
- Territory: northern Croatia and Slovenia
- Headquarters: Zagreb, Croatia

Information
- Denomination: Eastern Orthodox
- Sui iuris church: Serbian Orthodox Church
- Established: 1931
- Cathedral: Cathedral of the Transfiguration of the Lord, Zagreb
- Language: Church Slavonic, Serbian

Current leadership
- Bishop: Kirilo Bojović (administrator)

Map

Website
- Metropolitanate of Zagreb and Ljubljana

The Metropolitanate of Zagreb and Ljubljana (Serbian: Митрополија загребачко-љубљанска; Croatian: Mitropolija zagrebačko-ljubljanska) is a metropolitan diocese of the Serbian Orthodox Church, covering northern Croatia and entire territory of Slovenia.

The episcopal see is located at the Cathedral of the Transfiguration of the Lord, Zagreb. Its headquarters and bishop's residence are also in Zagreb.

== History ==
During the Middle Ages, Slovenia was under Habsburg rule, while the neighbouring Banate of Slavonia was under the rule of Hungarian kings. Some eastern regions of medieval Slavonia were inhabited by ethnic Serbs, who settled there after fleeing Bosnia during the 15th century, even before the Ottoman conquest of Bosnia in 1463. In 1438, Pope Eugene IV sent the inquisitor Giacomo della Marca to Slavonia as a missionary to baptize "schismatic" Serbs in "Roman religion", and if that failed, to banish them. In 1454, the Serbian Orthodox liturgical book Varaždin Apostol was written in Upper-Slavonian city of Varaždin, for princess Katarina Branković of Serbia, wife of Ulrich II, Count of Celje.

In the first half of the 16th century, Slavonia was devastated by frequent wars. The eastern part (Lower Slavonia) was conquered by the Ottomans, while the western part (Upper Slavonia) came under Habsburg rule. Since the renewal of the Serbian Patriarchate of Peć in 1557, the Eastern Orthodox Serbs of Lower Slavonia were placed under the jurisdiction of the Eparchy of Požega, with seat at the Orahovica Monastery. In 1595, the Metropolitan Vasilije of Požega moved to Upper Slavonia, under Habsburg rule, in order to avoid Ottoman oppression. His successors were headquartered in the Marča Monastery. In those areas, Serb migrants served as soldiers of the Varaždin Generalate. During the 17th century, bishops of Marča led the difficult fight against Roman Catholic proselytism.

In addition to Marča Monastery, the other spiritual center of Eastern Orthodox Serbs in the area was and still is Lepavina Monastery. Archimandrite Kondrat of Lepavina was killed in 1716, defending the purity of the Eastern Orthodox faith. He was killed by those Serbs who converted to Catholicism. In 1734, the seat moved to Lepavina Monastery and the diocese was renamed Eparchy of Lepavina. Bishop Simeon Filipović of Lepavina (1734-1743) also had residence in Sjeverin. After his death and several years of administration, the Eparchy of Lepavina was abolished, and in 1750 its territory came under the jurisdiction of the Eparchy of Kostajnica. In 1771, the region came under the jurisdiction of the Eparchy of Pakrac, and that remained until 1931. After 1766, eparchy became suffragan of the autocephalous Metropolitanate of Karlovci (since 1848, Patriarchate of Karlovci).

After World War I and the creation of the Kingdom of Yugoslavia, the eparchy was united with other Serbian ecclesiastical provinces to form the unified Serbian Orthodox Church, a process completed in 1920.

Since the city of Zagreb was the second capital of the kingdom, initiative was revived for the restoration of the old Eparchy of Lepavina as the Eparchy of Zagreb. After long preparations, the region was detached from the Eparchy of Pakrac in 1931, and the new Eparchy of Zagreb was created, with its bishop receiving the honorary title of Metropolitan.

The first Metropolitan of Zagreb was Dositej Vasić, a learned theologian and man of broad vision and understanding in relations with other nations and religions. In spite of that, after the Nazi occupation of Yugoslavia in World War II and the creation of the Independent State of Croatia (1941), he was arrested and tortured. As a consequence, he died in 1945, exiled from his eparchy. From 1942 to 1945 Zagreb was the seat of the Croatian Orthodox Church and Cathedral od the Transfiguration of the Lord became the seat of Patriarch Germogen.

After World War II, the Metropolitanate of Zagreb and other dioceses in the territory of Croatia were administered by vicar bishop Arsenije Bradvarević. He was succeeded by Damascus Grdanički, previously Bishop of Banat, and after his death in 1969, the metropolitanate was administered by the Bishop of Slavonia, Emilijan Marinović.

At the regular session of the Holy Assembly of the Serbian Orthodox Church in 1977, the spiritual guidance of this metropolitanate was entrusted to Jovan Pavlović, vicarian bishop of Lepavina, who was elected Metropolitan of Zagreb in 1982. The following year, the name of the eparchy was changed to Eparchy of Zagreb and Ljubljana. On the proposal of the metropolitan Jovan, the name of the eparchy was changed once more in 1994 to Metropolitanate of Zagreb, Ljubljana, and all of Italy. Jurisdiction over Italy, that was transferred to the metropolitanate in 1994, lasted until 2011 whent it was transferred to then Eparchy of Austria and Switzerland.

Metropolitan Jovan organized the meetings of Serbian Patriarch Pavle and Cardinal of Zagreb Franjo Kuharić (first in the spring of 1991 in Sremski Karlovci, and the other later in Slavonski Brod). He also organized a meeting of Patriarch Pavle and the Croatian President Franjo Tuđman.

In 2014, bishop Porfirije Perić was elected Metropolitan of Zagreb and Ljubljana and enthroned in Zagreb by Serbian Patriarch Irinej.

In 2021, Metropolitan Porfirije was elected as the new Serbian Patriarch.

== List of bishops ==
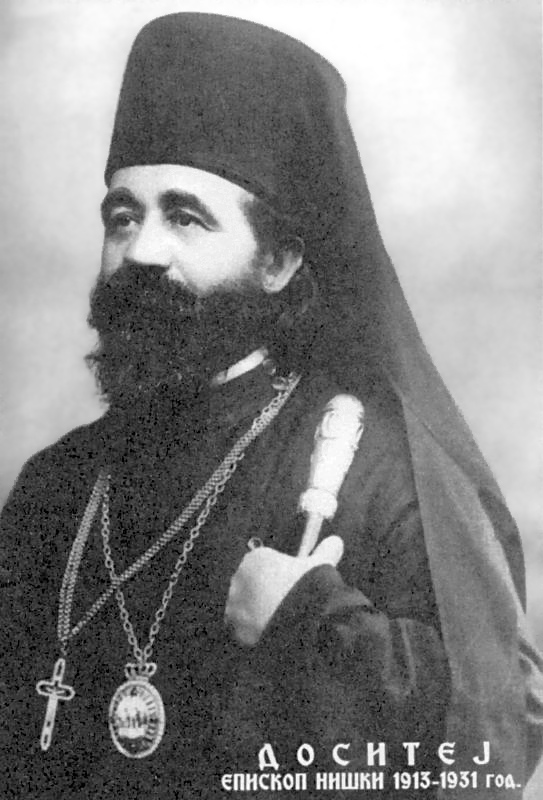
Dositej Vasić

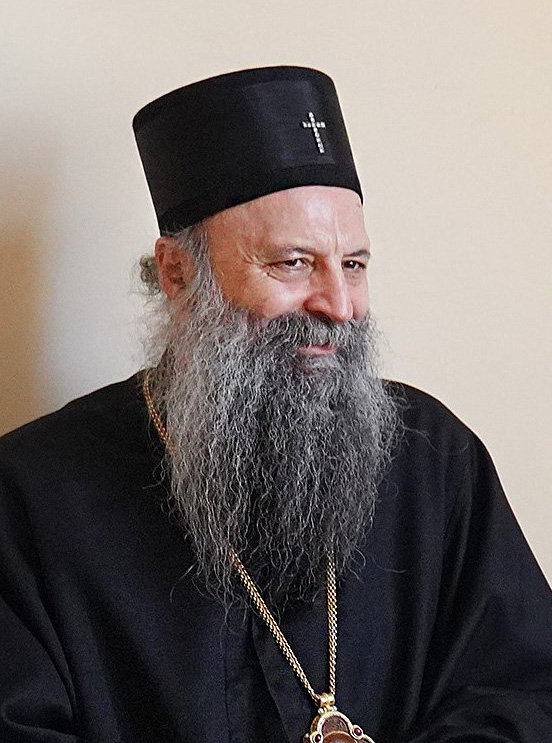
Porfirije Perić

=== Bishops of Marča ===
- Maksim Predojević (1630–1642)
- Gavrilo Predojević (1642–1644)
- Vasilije Predojević (1644–1648)
- Sava Stanislavić (1648–1661)
- Gavrilo Mijakić (1661–1671)

=== Bishops of Lepavina ===
- Simeon Filipović (1734–1743)
- various administrators (1743–1750)

=== Bishops of Kostajnica ===
- Arsenije Teofanović (1750–1753)
- Josif Stojanović (1754–1771)

=== Metropolitan bishops of Zagreb and Ljubljana ===
- Dositej Vasić (1931–1945)
- Arsenije Bradvarević (administrator) (1945–1947)
- Damaskin Grdanički (1947–1969)
- Emilijan Marinović (administrator) (1969–1977)
- Jovan Pavlović (1977–2014)
- Fotije Sladojević (administrator) (2014)
- Porfirije Perić (2014–2021)
- Patriarch Porfirije (administrator) (2021–2023)
- Kirilo Bojović (administrator) (2023–present)

== Notable monasteries ==
- Lepavina

== Gallery ==
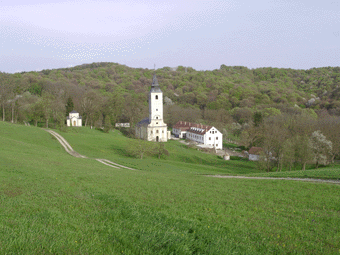
Lepavina Monastery

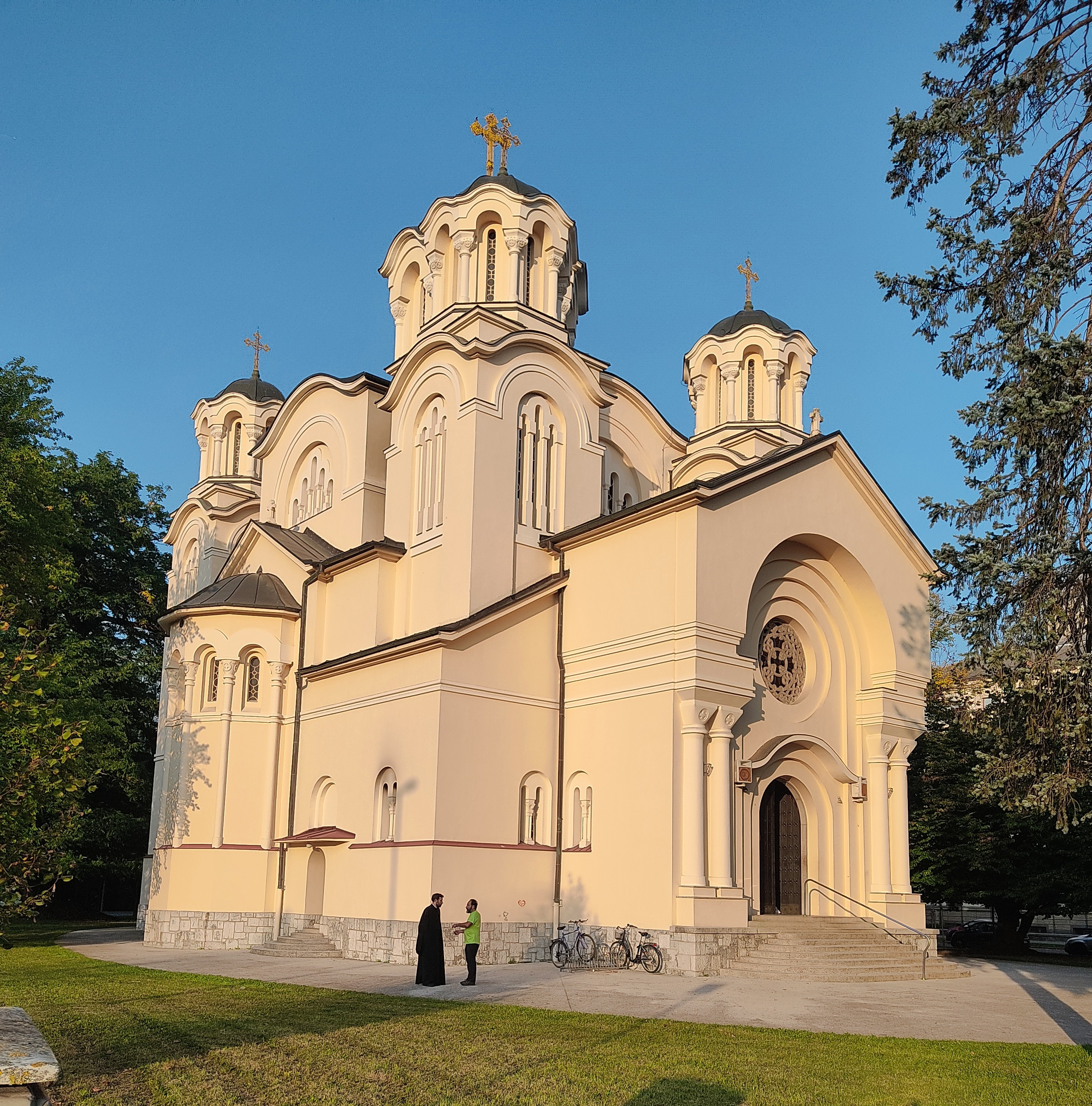
Church of Sts. Cyril and Methodius, Ljubljana

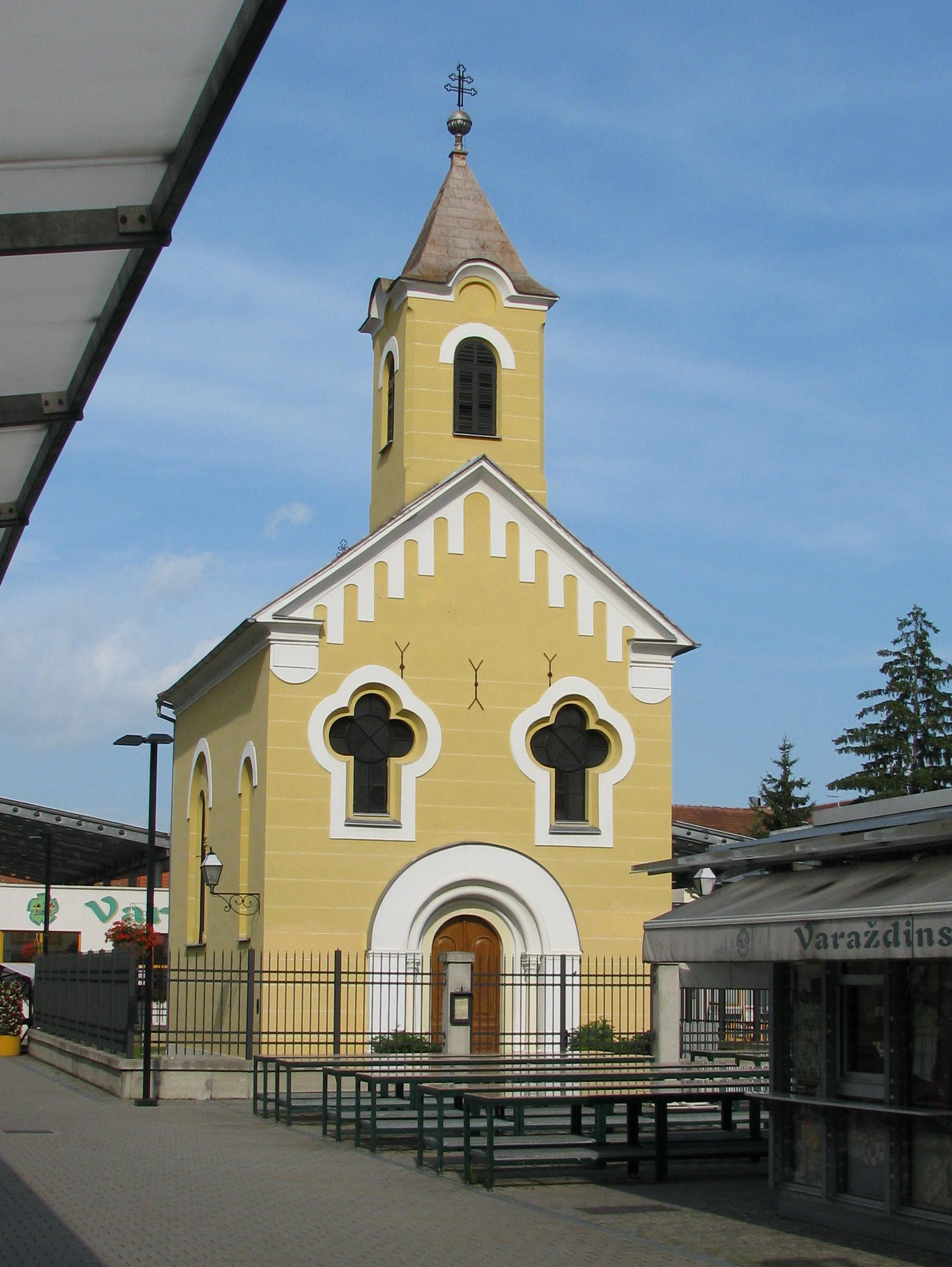
Church of St. George, Varaždin

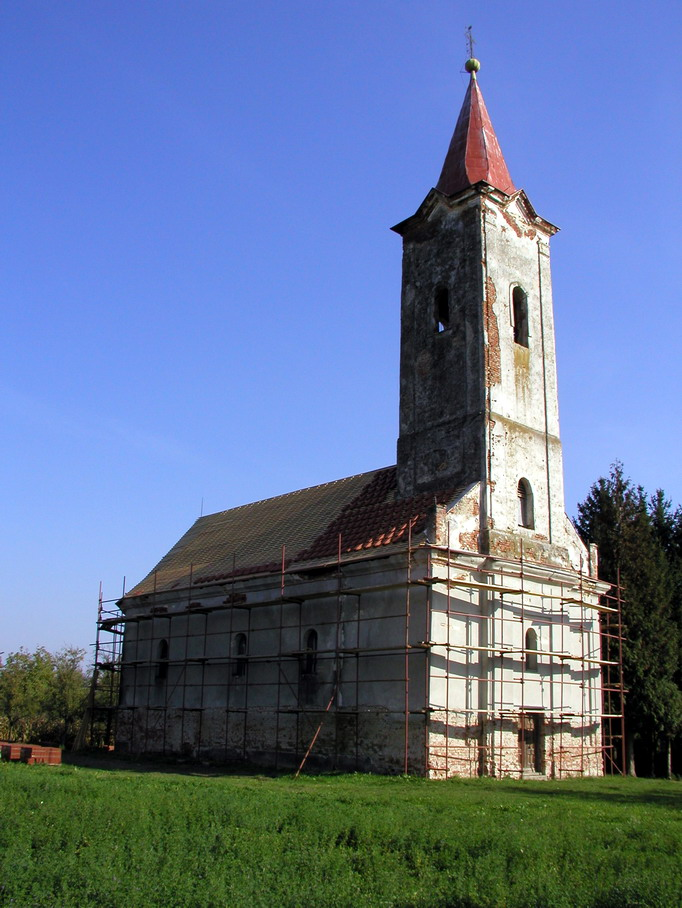
Church of St. George, Grubišno Polje

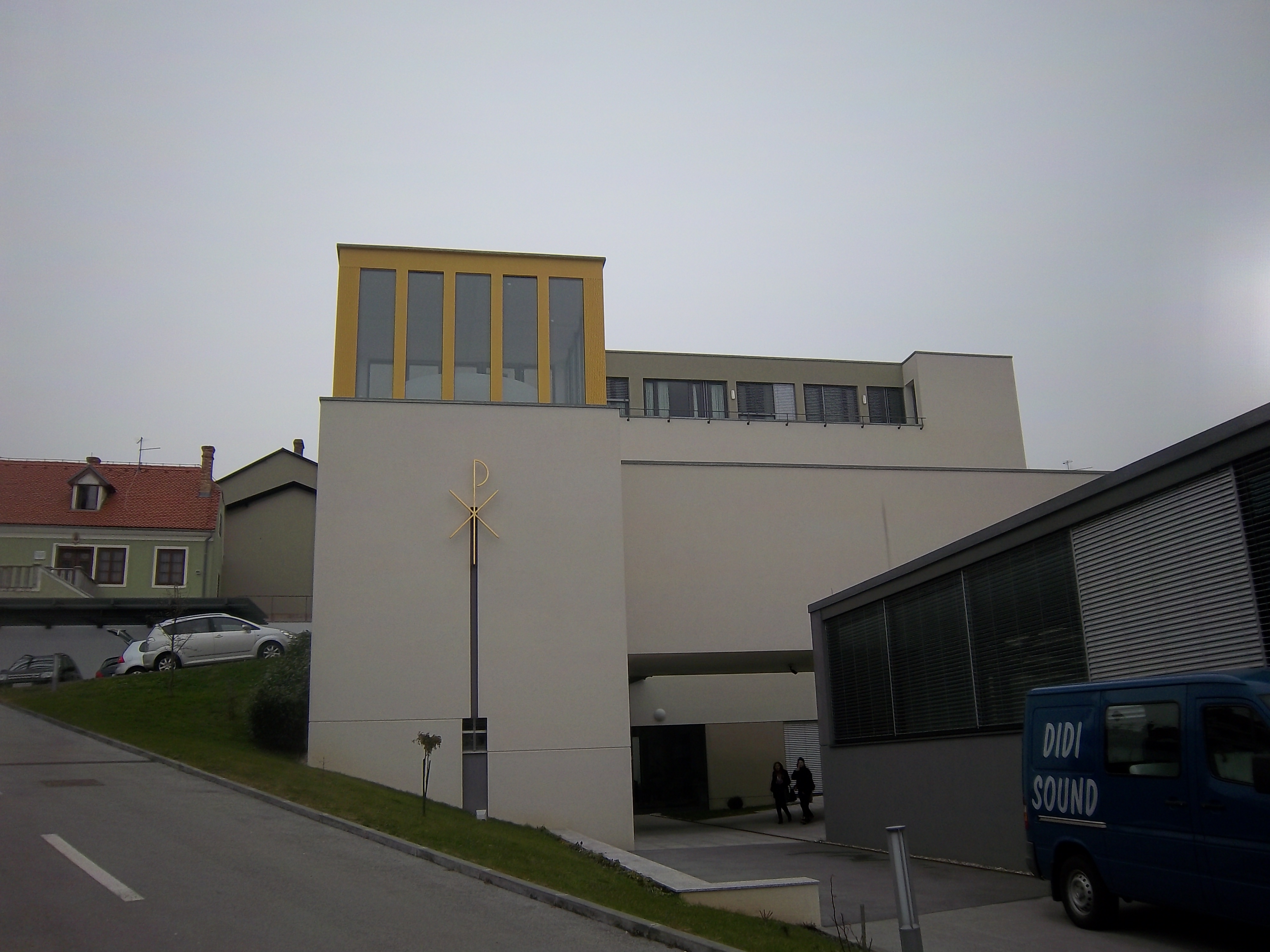
Kantakuzina Katarina Branković Serbian Orthodox Secondary School

== See also ==
- Eastern Orthodoxy in Croatia
- Eparchies and metropolitanates of the Serbian Orthodox Church
- Serbs of Zagreb
- Serbs of Croatia

== Sources ==
- Bataković, Dušan T., ed. (2005). Histoire du peuple serbe [History of the Serbian People] (in French). Lausanne: L’Age d’Homme.
- Ćirković, Sima (2004). The Serbs. Malden: Blackwell Publishing.
- Mileusnić, Slobodan (1997). Spiritual Genocide: A survey of destroyed, damaged and desecrated churches, monasteries and other church buildings during the war 1991-1995 (1997). Belgrade: Museum of the Serbian Orthodox Church.
- Miller, Nicholas J. (1997). Between Nation and State: Serbian Politics in Croatia Before the First World War. Pittsburgh: University of Pittsburgh Press.
- Vjerske zajednice u Hrvatskoj, Zagreb: Prometej, 2008. (in Croatian)
- Вуковић, Сава (1996). Српски јерарси од деветог до двадесетог века (Serbian Hierarchs from the 9th to the 20th Century). Евро, Унирекс, Каленић.
- Raković, Aleksandar (2013). "Short Existence of the Faculty of Eastern Orthodox Theology at the University of Zagreb 1920-1924" (PDF). Теолошки погледи. 46 (3): 951–956.
