= Dositej Vasić =

Serbian Orthodox Metropolitan of Zagreb (1877–1945)

His Grace Dositej
- Metropolitan of Zagreb
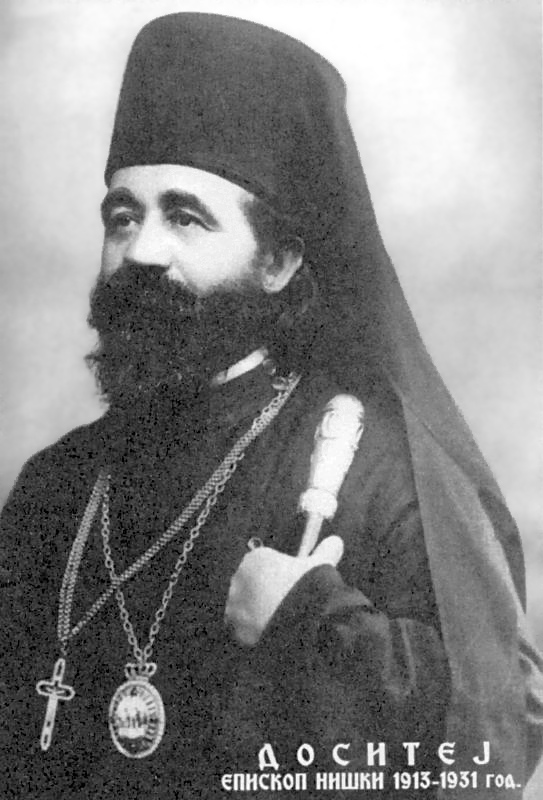
- Native name: Доситеј
- Church: Serbian Orthodox Church
- Diocese: Metropolitanate of Zagreb
- See: Zagreb
- Installed: 1931
- Term ended: 1945
- Successor: Damaskin

Orders
- Rank: Metropolitan bishop

Personal details
- Born: Dragutin Vasić; 5 December 1878 Belgrade, Principality of Serbia
- Died: 13 January 1945 (aged 66) Belgrade, Yugoslavia
- Denomination: Eastern Orthodoxy
- Education: Kiev Theological Academy

Dositej Vasić (Serbian Cyrillic: Доситеј Васић; 5 December 1878 – 13 January 1945) was the first Serbian Orthodox Metropolitan of Zagreb and a victim of the genocide of Serbs in the Independent State of Croatia. He is an Eastern Orthodox saint.

== Life ==
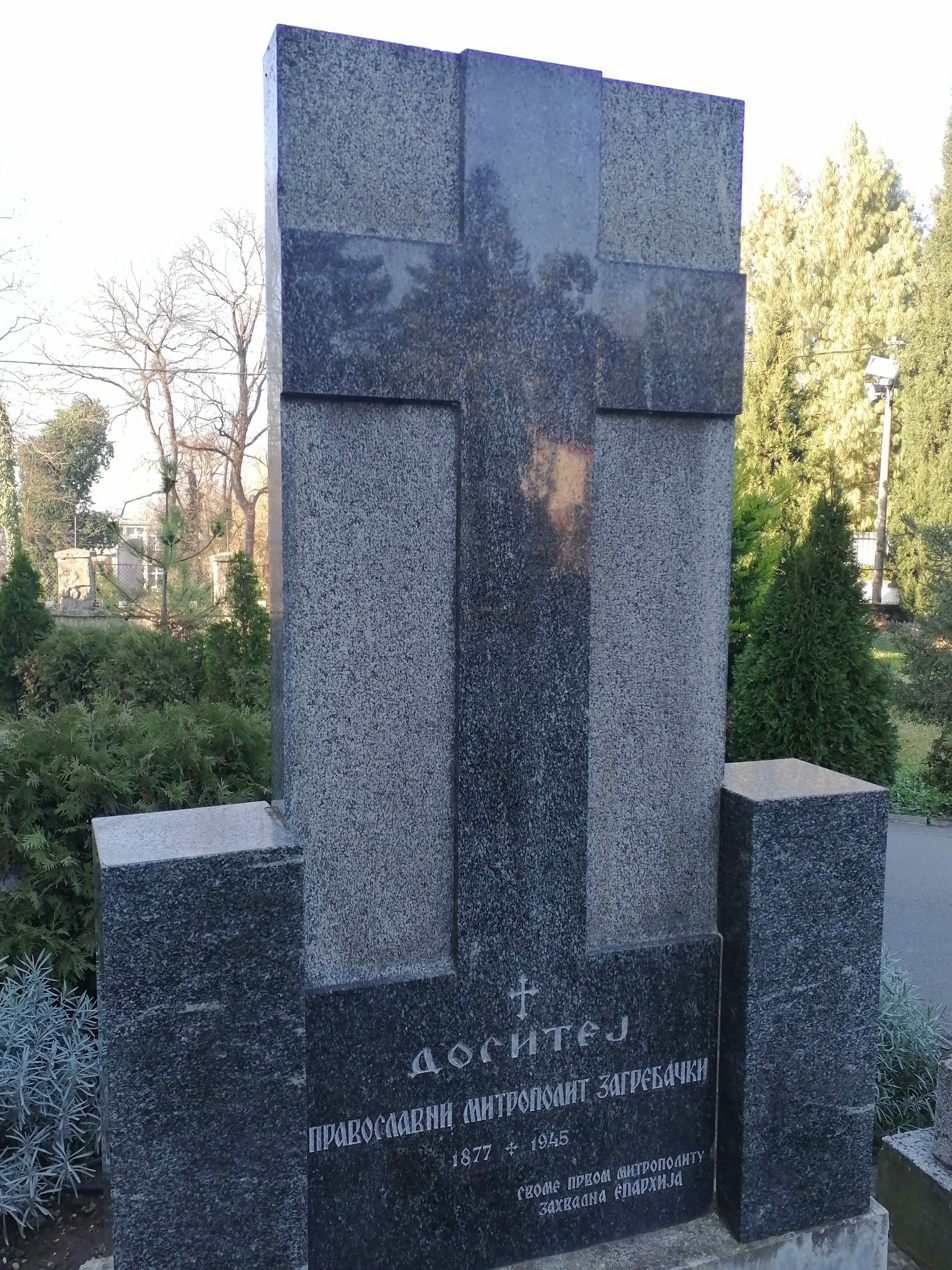
Dositej Vasić's grave, Belgrade

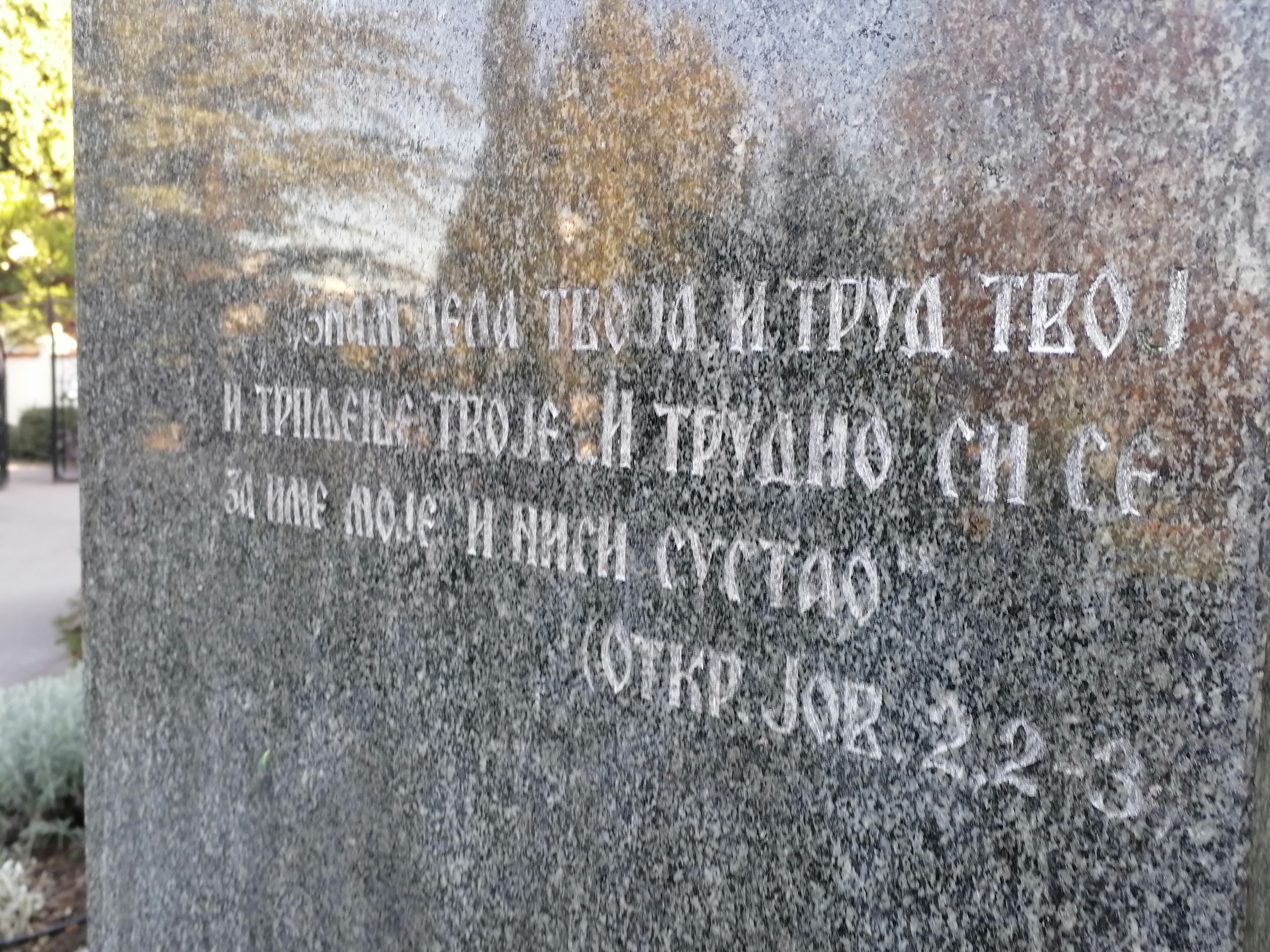
Dositej Vasić's grave, Belgrade

Dragutin Vasić was born on 5 December 1887 in Belgrade. He graduated and acquired the master's degree in 1904 at the Kiev Theological Academy. After that, he graduated philosophy at the universities of Berlin and Leipzig.

The Holy Synod of the Serbian Orthodox Church elected him the bishop of Niš in May 1913. During the World War I, he did not want to leave Niš, so the enemy found him in his residence and interned him as a prisoner of war. Immediately after that, 150 priests were brutally slaughtered by the Bulgarian occupying authorities. He returned from the internment camp to his eparchy in 1918. He was Bishop of Transcarpathia and vice-president of the Holy Synod and took part in the negotiations with the Patriarchate of Constantinople about the re-establishment of the Serbian Patriarchate in 1920. Upon the establishment of the Metropolitanate of Zagreb, the bishop Dositej was ordained its first metropolitan.

He died on 13 January 1945 as a consequence of the brutal torture he had suffered in Zagreb prison, in which Roman Catholic nuns had participated as well. He was buried in the churchyard of the Vavedenje Monastery in Belgrade.

== Canonization ==
Vasić was canonized by the Serbian Orthodox Church in May 2000.

Eastern Orthodox Church titles
New title	Metropolitan of Zagreb; 1931–1945	Succeeded by Damaskin Grdanički
Preceded by Domentijan Popović	Bishop of Niš; 1913–1931	Succeeded by Jovan Ilić
