= Medinci =

Coordinates: 45°44′N 17°45′E

- Village
- Interactive map of Medinci
- Country: Croatia
- County: Virovitica-Podravina County

Area
  - Total: 2.8 sq mi (7.3 km^{2})

Population (2021)
  - Total: 154
  - Density: 55/sq mi (21/km^{2})
- Time zone: UTC+1 (CET)
  - Summer (DST): UTC+2 (CEST)

Medinci is a village in Croatia. It is connected by the D34 highway.

== Notable individuals ==
- Metropolitan Jovan Pavlović
