= Franjo Klein =

Austrian architect (1828–1889)

- Born: 1828; Vienna, Austrian Empire
- Died: 1889 (aged 60–61); Zagreb, Austria-Hungary
- Education: Academy of Fine Arts Vienna
- Occupation: Architect
- Buildings: Church of the Assumption of the Blessed Virgin Mary in Molve (1862); Zagreb Orthodox Cathedral (1866); Zagreb Synagogue (1867); Croatian Institute of Music (1876, with Janko Grahor)

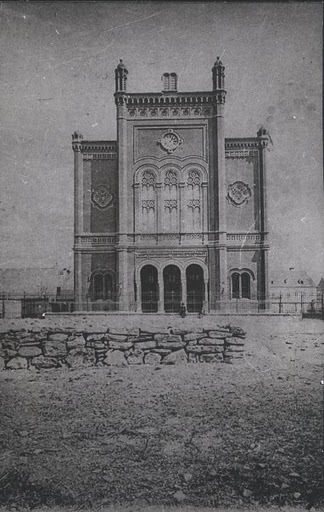
Zagreb Synagogue shortly after its consecration in 1867

Franjo Klein (1828–1889) was one of the most important architects in the period of an early and mature historicism in Croatia and the most prominent architect in Zagreb in the 1860s and 1870s.

== Biography ==
=== Early work in Vienna and Bjelovar ===
Klein was born into an evangelical family in Vienna where he received training in building and stone carving trades and completed two years of architecture studies at the Academy of Fine Arts Vienna. For some time, he worked as a draughtsman in Vienna. He moved to Croatia in 1851, successfully applied for a job as a bricklayer foreman in the Varaždin-Đurđevac Regiment, and spent the next eight years working for the Regiment in Bjelovar, until he was transferred to Zagreb in 1859.

Much of his early works were neo-Renaissance buildings with an accentuated plastic and decorative facade (the building in 1 Mesnička Street) or a mixture of historical styles (Moorish-Gothic-Renaissance elements in his main work, the synagogue in Praška Street, 1867, demolished in 1941).

It is known that Klein designed and built a number of public buildings during his stay in Bjelovar, but there are no surviving records that would support a reliable attribution. It is conjectured that several buildings in Bjelovar - such as Adjutant's house (1855–1859), Sergeant Major's house (1855–1856) and the prison building (1854–1861) - were actually designed by Klein.

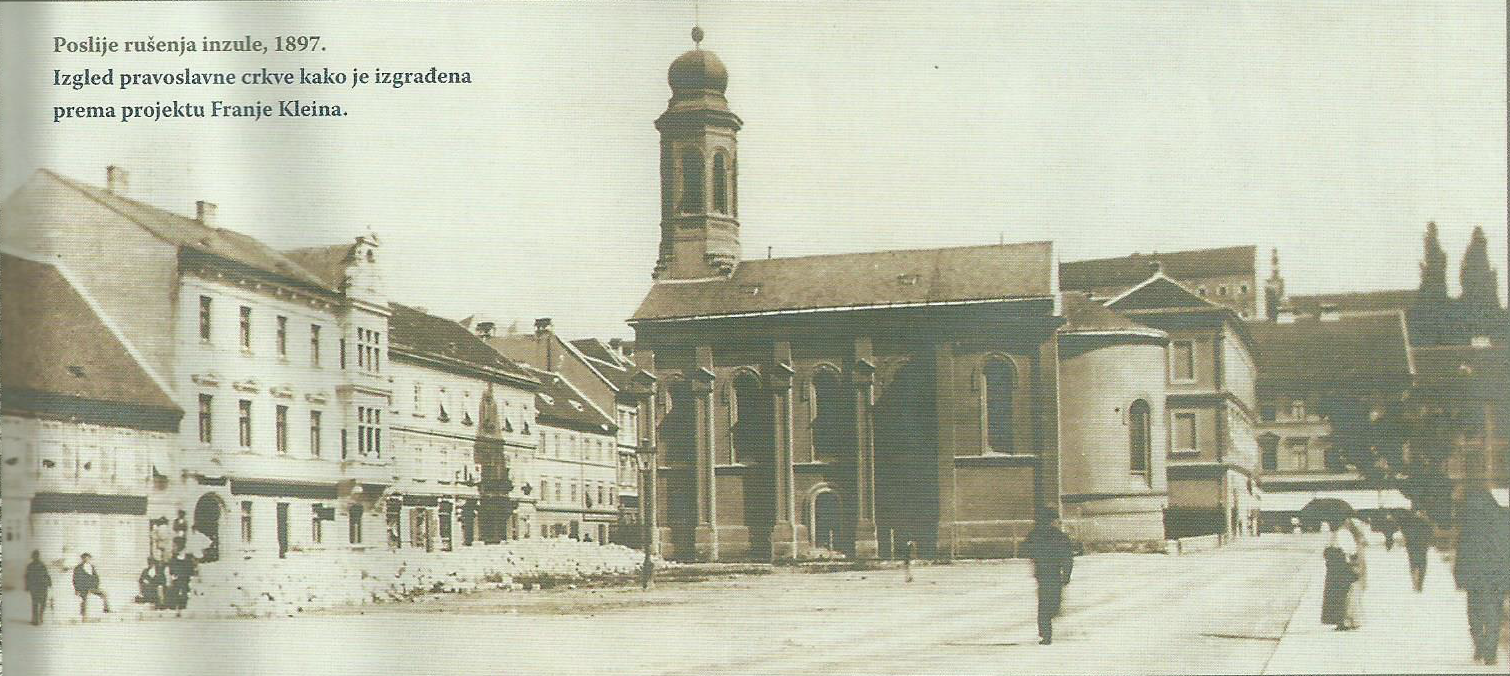
The Serbian Orthodox Cathedral in Zagreb

His earliest known work is the Church of the Assumption of the Blessed Virgin Mary in Molve, built between 1855 and 1862. It is the most significant example of Rundbogenstil in sacred architecture of Croatia.

=== Work in Zagreb ===
Klein was commissioned to build the Zagreb Synagogue. Construction began in 1866 and was completed the following year. He also built Zagreb Orthodox Cathedral located on the Petar Preradović Square.

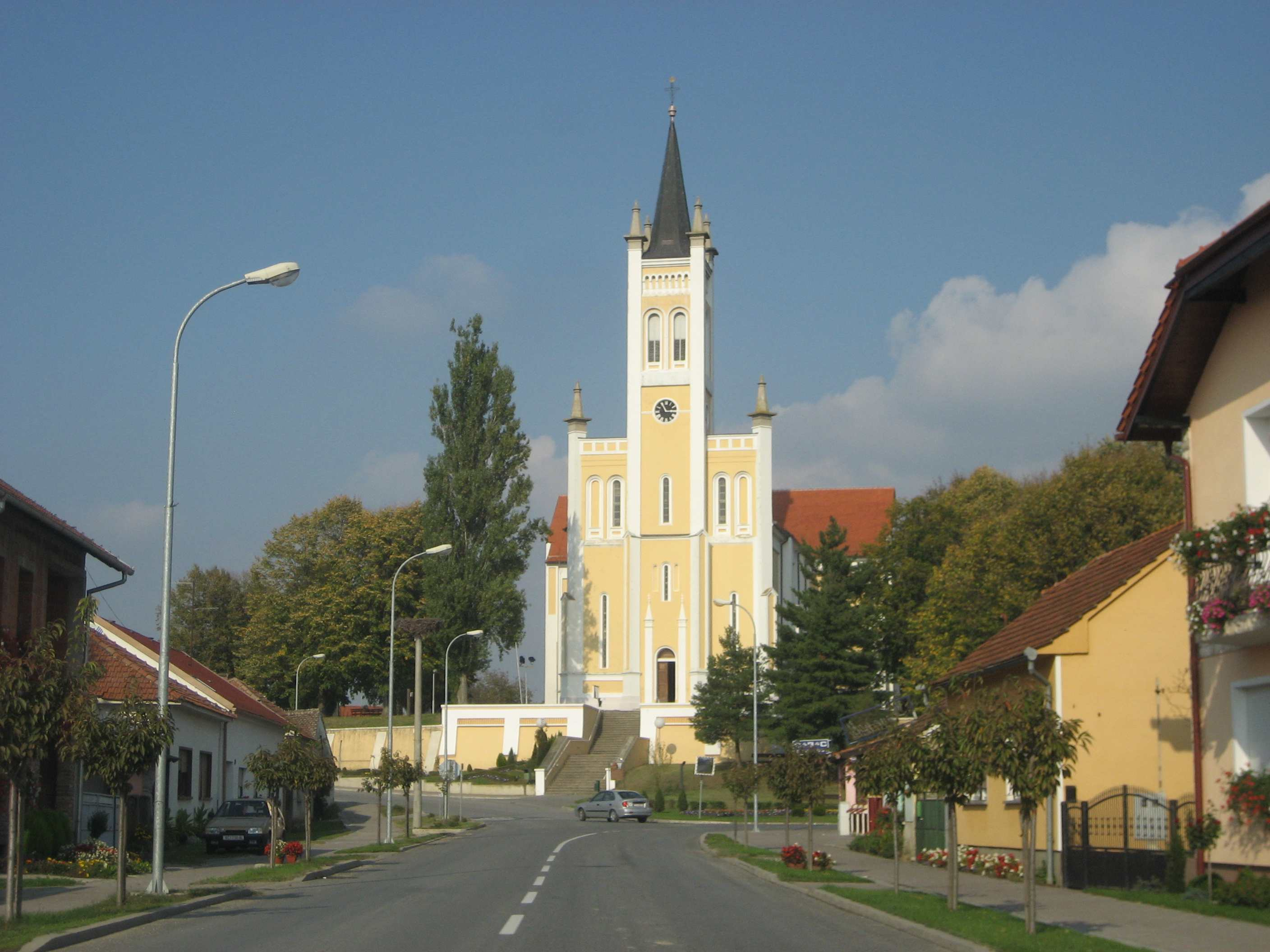
Church of the Assumption of the Blessed Virgin Mary in Molve (1855–1862) is the earliest work reliably attributed to Klein.

In 1868 Klein and Janko Grahor founded a construction company named Grahor and Klein. After Klein left the company in 1886, it was renamed to Grahor and Sons.

== Bibliography ==
- Damjanović, Dragan (June 2009). "Djelovanje arhitekta Franje Kleina u Varaždinsko-đurđevačkoj pukovniji (1851.-1859.)" [Franjo Klein’s Architectural Activities within the Varaždin and Ðurđevac Regiment (1851-1859)] (PDF). Prostor (in Croatian). 17 (1). University of Zagreb, Faculty of Architecture: 64–77.
- Knežević, Snješka (2001). "The Synagogue of Zagreb, 1867-1942". The Synagogue and Zagreb (PDF). Jewish Community of Zagreb. pp. 42–46.
