= Bernard Grüner =

- Born: 14 May 1888; Sieniawa, Austro-Hungarian Empire, (now Poland)
- Died: 21 February 1955 (aged 66); Zagreb, SFR Yugoslavia, (now Croatia)
- Children: Teodor Grüner (son)

Bernard Grüner (14 May 1888 – 21 February 1955) was a Croatian-Jewish composer, hazzan of the Dohány Street Synagogue and chief hazzan of the Jewish Community in Zagreb.

Grüner was born in Sieniawa, Poland (then part of the Austro-Hungarian Empire) on 14 May 1888. As a child, when he was nine years old, Grüner was a known singer in the Budapest Jewish circles. He finished elementary school and three years of economic high school in Budapest, where he also attended Yeshiva. In Szatmár County he gained his orthodox rabbinical college degree. Grüner studied for hazzan with the Hungarian State Opera House scholarship. In 1913, his first hazzan position was in Nitra, Slovakia. From 1918 to 1923, Grüner served as hazzan at the Dohány Street Synagogue in Budapest. In Székesfehérvár, Hungary he served as hazzan from 1923 to 1929. In 1929, Grüner moved to Zagreb where he was appointed as the hazzan at the Zagreb Synagogue. In 1941 during the destruction of a Zagreb Synagogue Grüner saved, with help from Croatian composer Franjo Lučić, the Torah rolls and organ. Grüner was taken to prison at Savska street by Ustaše, but under the influence of the Archbishop of Zagreb, Aloysius Stepinac, he was soon released and managed to survive the Holocaust. From the beginning of his service as hazzan in Nitra, he wrote down the chants that he used in a synagogue services. Grüner chants, from 1906 to 1938, were incorporated into five manuscripts that are saved at his son personal library. With in the Grüner manuscript collection there are also chants of Salomon Sulzer, Louis Lewandowski and Samuel Naumbourg. Grüner composed over 70 synagogue chants. With his death in 1955, Croatian synagogue chants tradition was stopped.

In 2012, music notes book "Synagogue chants of Bernard Grüner" was presented at the Jewish community Zagreb.

== Bibliography ==
- Kraus, Ognjen (1998). Dva stoljeća povijesti i kulture Židova u Zagrebu i Hrvatskoj. Zagreb: Židovska općina Zagreb. ISBN 953-96836-2-9.
- Živanović, Ivan; Merkaš, Davor (2011). Sinagogalni napjevi. Zagreb: Udruga za proučavanje i promicanje kulturne baštine "Tamar".
- Ivan Živanović, Davor Merkaš (2011). Sinagogalni napjevi (Media notes) (in Croatian and Hebrew). Bernard Grüner. Zagreb: Udruga za proučavanje i promicanje kulturne baštine "Tamar". 979-0-706701-98-1.
