= Zagreb Synagogue =

Former synagogue in Zagreb, Croatia

- Croatian: Zagrebačka sinagoga
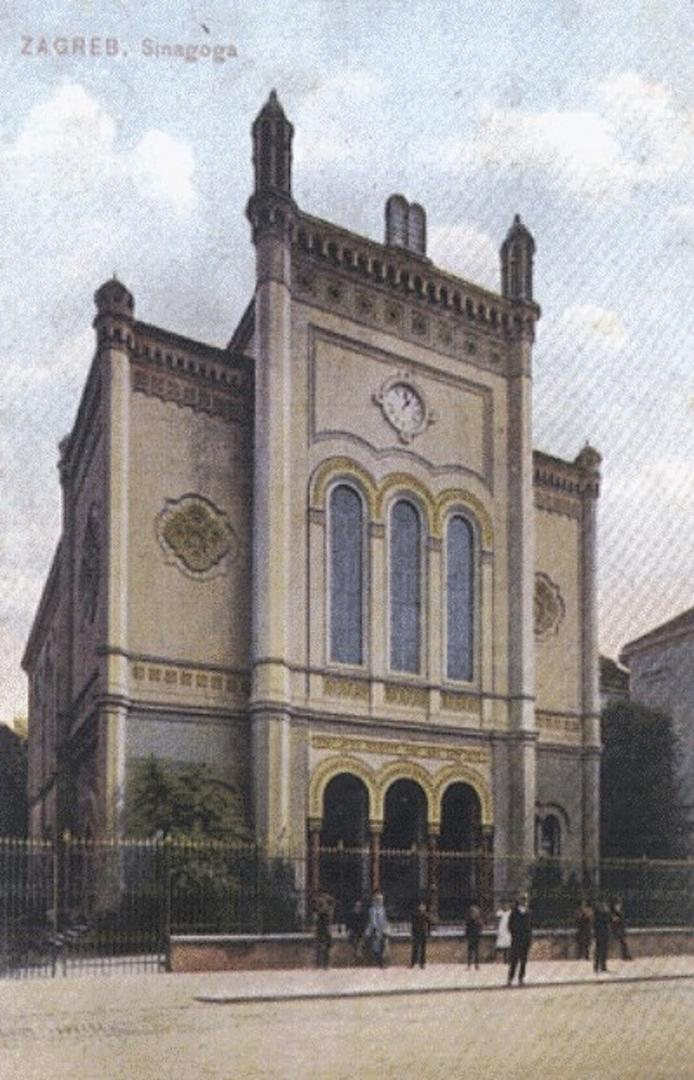
- An image of the synagogue in 1906

- Location of the destroyed synagogue in Croatia

Religion
- Affiliation: Orthodox Judaism (former)
- Ecclesiastical or organizational status: Synagogue (1867–1941)
- Status: Destroyed

Location
- Location: Praška Street, Zagreb
- Country: Croatia
- Interactive map of Zagreb Synagogue
- Coordinates: 45°48′42.5″N 15°58′41″E

Architecture
- Architect: Franjo Klein
- Type: Synagogue architecture
- Style: Moorish Revival
- Established: 1806 (as a congregation)
- Completed: 1867

Specifications
- Direction of façade: West
- Capacity: 488 (original design); 708 (1921 adaptation)
- Length: 30 m (98 ft)
- Width: 19.7 m (65 ft)
- Height (max): 24 m (79 ft)

The Zagreb Synagogue (Croatian: Zagrebačka sinagoga) was a former Orthodox Jewish congregation and synagogue, located in Zagreb, in modern-day Croatia. The synagogue building was constructed in 1867 in the Kingdom of Croatia-Slavonia within the Austrian Empire, and was used until it was demolished by the Ustaše fascist authorities in 1941 in the Axis-aligned Independent State of Croatia.

The Moorish Revival synagogue, designed after the Leopoldstädter Tempel in Vienna, was located on modern-day Praška Street. It was the only purpose-built Jewish synagogue in the history of the city, and was one of the city's most prominent public buildings, as well as one of the most esteemed examples of synagogue architecture in the region.

Since the 1980s, plans were made to rebuild the synagogue in its original location. Due to various political circumstances, very limited progress has been made. Major disagreements exist between the government and Jewish organizations as to how much the latter should be involved in decisions about the reconstruction project, including proposed design and character of the new building.

== History ==
Encouraged by the 1782 Edict of Tolerance of Emperor Joseph II, Jews first permanently settled in Zagreb in the late eighteenth century, and founded the Jewish community in 1806. In 1809 the Jewish community had a rabbi, and by 1811 it had its own cemetery. As early as 1833, the community was permitted to buy land for construction of a synagogue, but did not have sufficient money to finance one at the time.

By 1855, the community had grown to 700 members and, on October 30 of that year, the decision was made to build a new Jewish synagogue. The construction committee, appointed in 1861, selected and purchased a parcel of land at the corner of Maria Valeria Street (now Praška Street) and Ban Jelačić Square, the central town square. However, a new urban planning scheme of 1864 reduced the area available for construction, and the community decided to buy another parcel of 1,540 square metres (16,600 sq ft) in Maria Valeria Street, approximately 80 metres (260 ft) south of the original location.

=== Design and construction ===
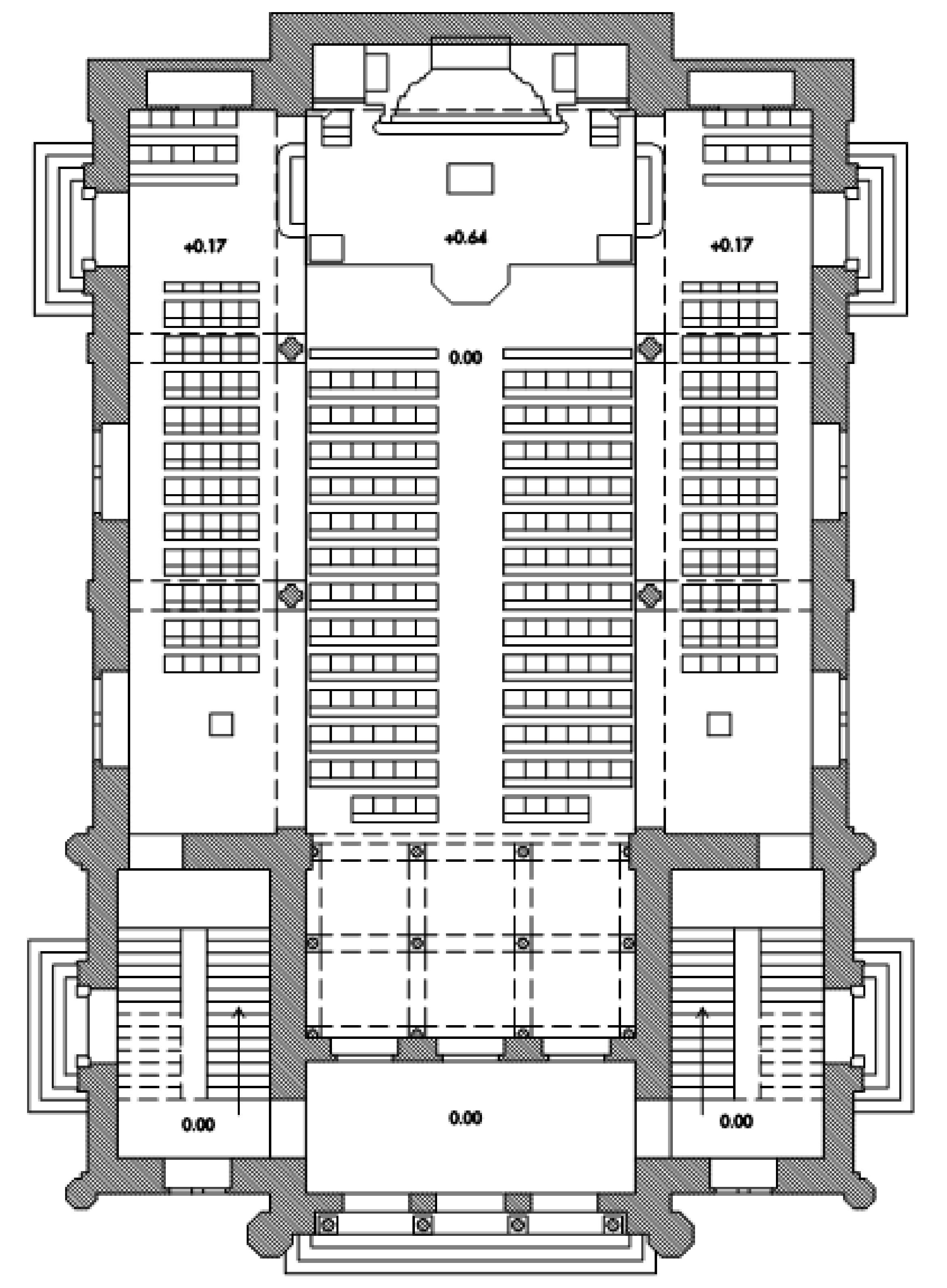
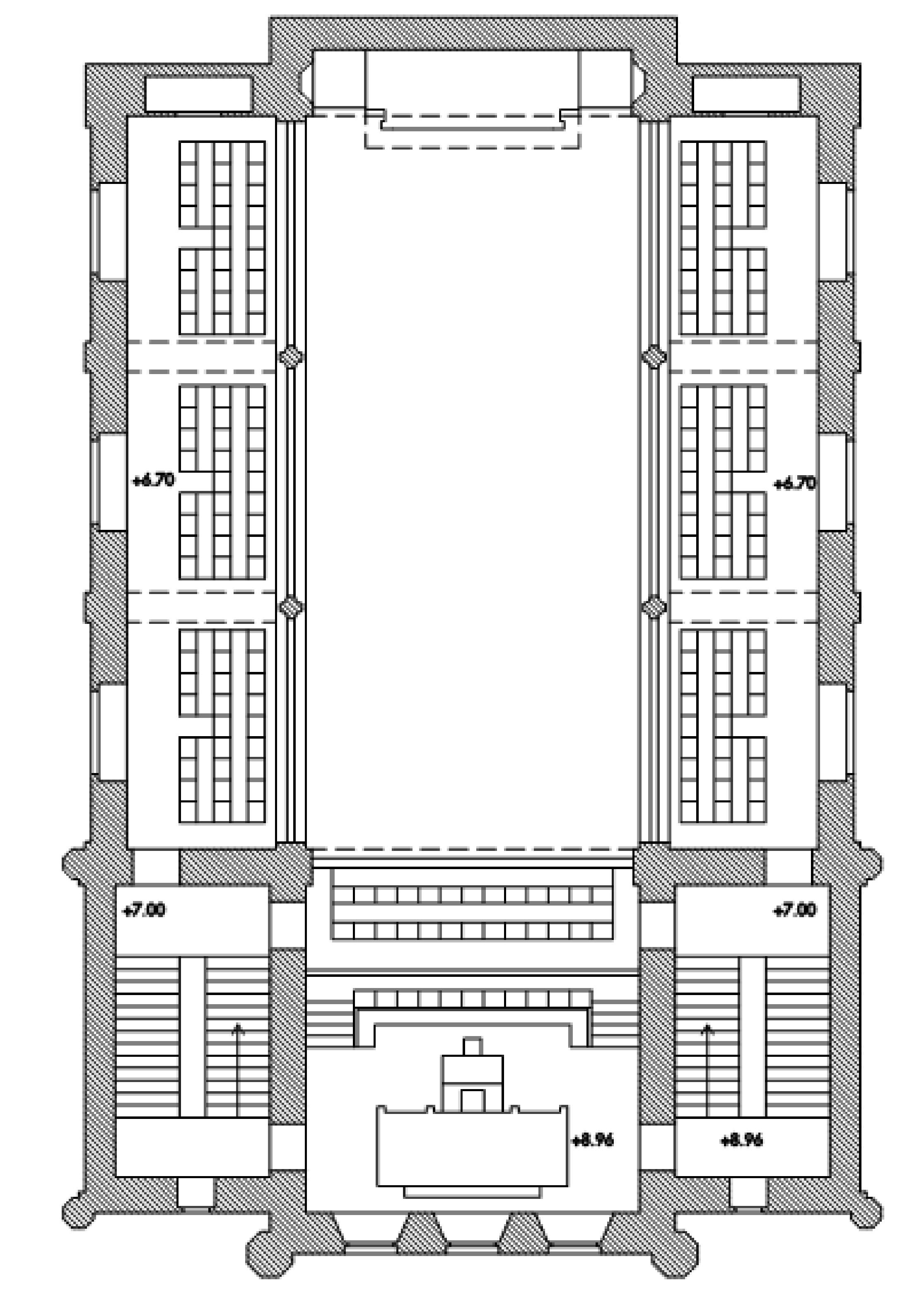
Computer reconstruction of the ground-floor and first-floor levels of the Zagreb Synagogue.

Franjo Klein, a Vienna-born Zagreb architect, was commissioned to build the synagogue. Klein, a representative of romantic historicism, modeled the building on the Viennese Leopoldstädter Tempel (1858), a Moorish Revival temple designed by Ludwig Förster. It became a prototype for synagogue design in Central Europe. Zagreb Synagogue used the already developed round arch style (Rundbogenstil), but did not adopt Förster's early oriental motifs.

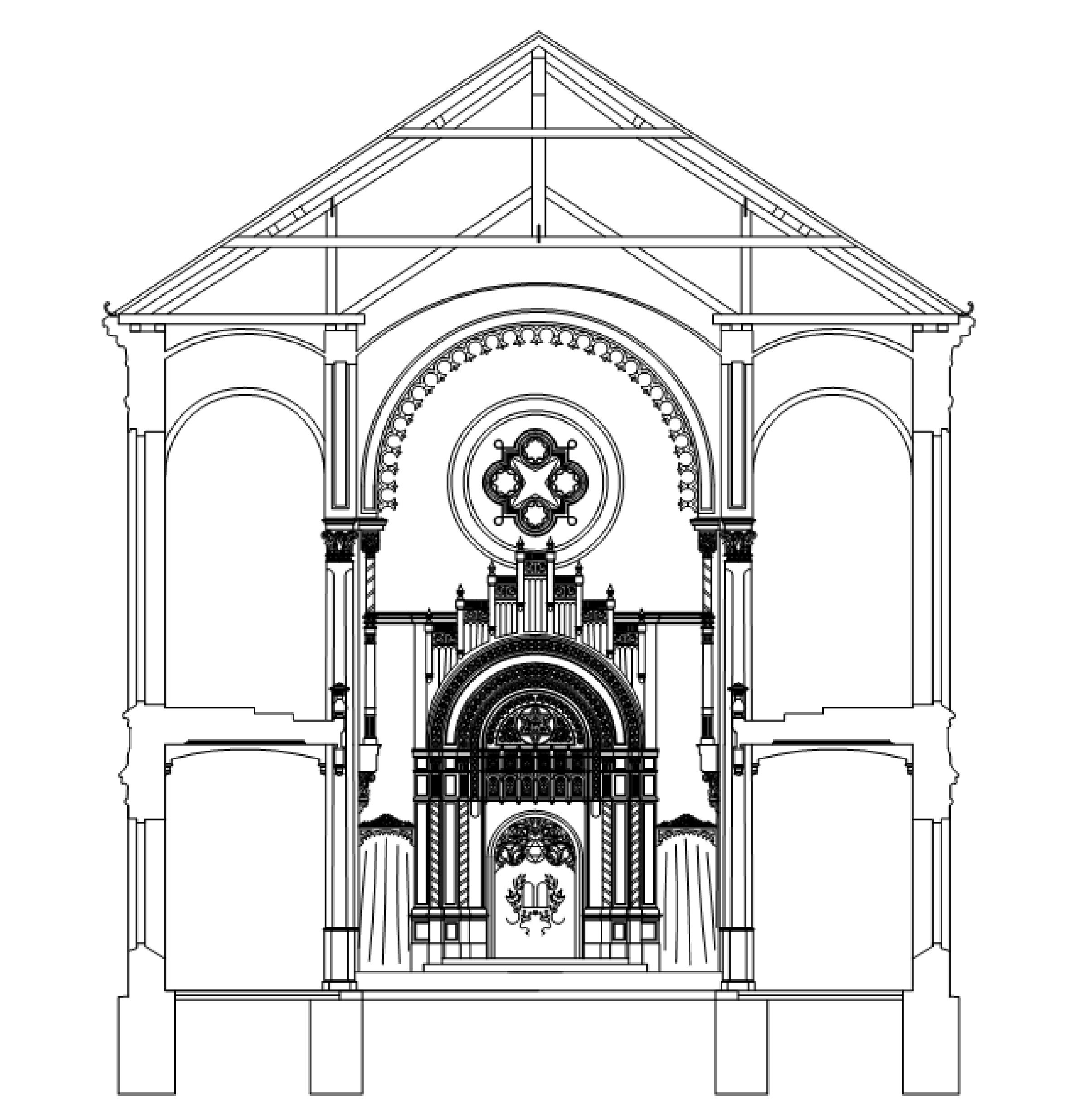
Computer reconstruction of the cross section of the Zagreb Synagogue.

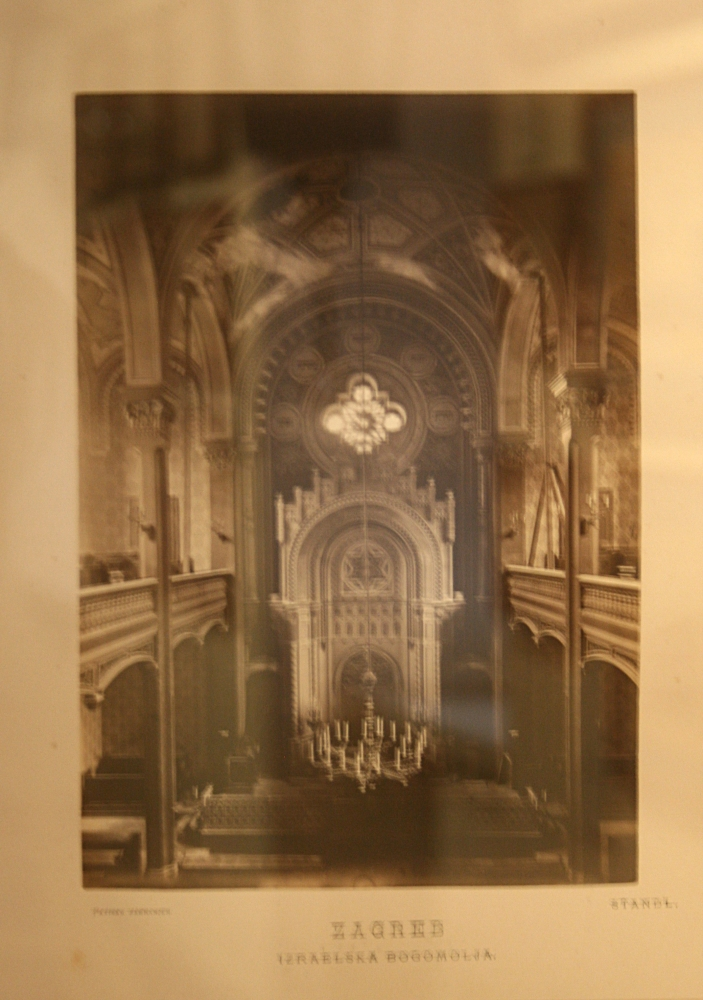
Synagogue's interior was photographed in 1880 by Ivan Standl.

The composition of the main facade, with its dominant drawn-out and elevated projection and the two symmetrical lower lateral parts, reflects the internal division into three naves. At ground-floor level, the front was distinguished by the three-arch entrance and bifora, whereas the first-floor level had a high triforium with an elevated arch and the quadrifoliate rosettes on the staircases.

The synagogue occupied the greater part of the plot, facing west. It receded from the street regulation-line in accordance with the rule then still enforced in Austria-Hungary, prohibiting non-Catholic places of worship from having a public entrance from the street. The synagogue had a wider and slightly higher central nave and two narrower naves; unlike Förster's synagogue in Vienna, it did not have a basilical plan.

Construction began in 1866 and was completed the following year. The synagogue was officially consecrated on September 27, 1867, a ceremony attended by representatives of city and regional authorities, Zagreb public figures, and many citizens. It was the first prominent public building in Zagreb's lower town, and its architecture and scale aroused general admiration and praise.

=== 19th and early 20th century ===
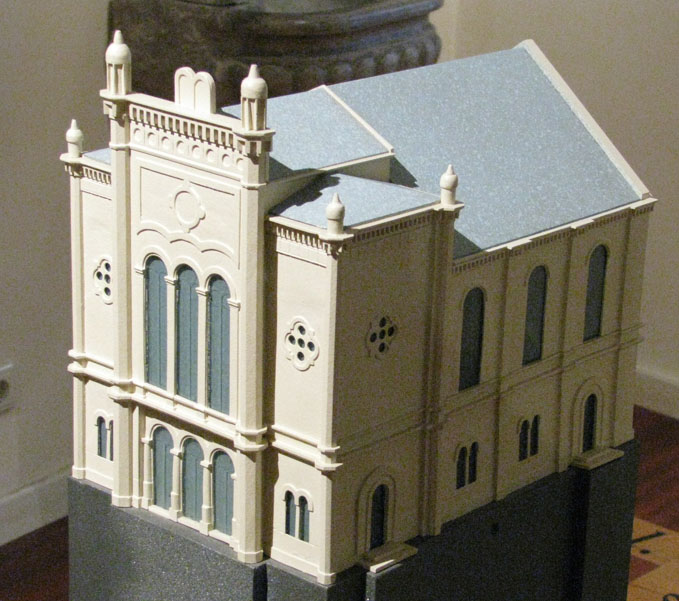
Model of the Zagreb Synagogue on display at the Zagreb City Museum.

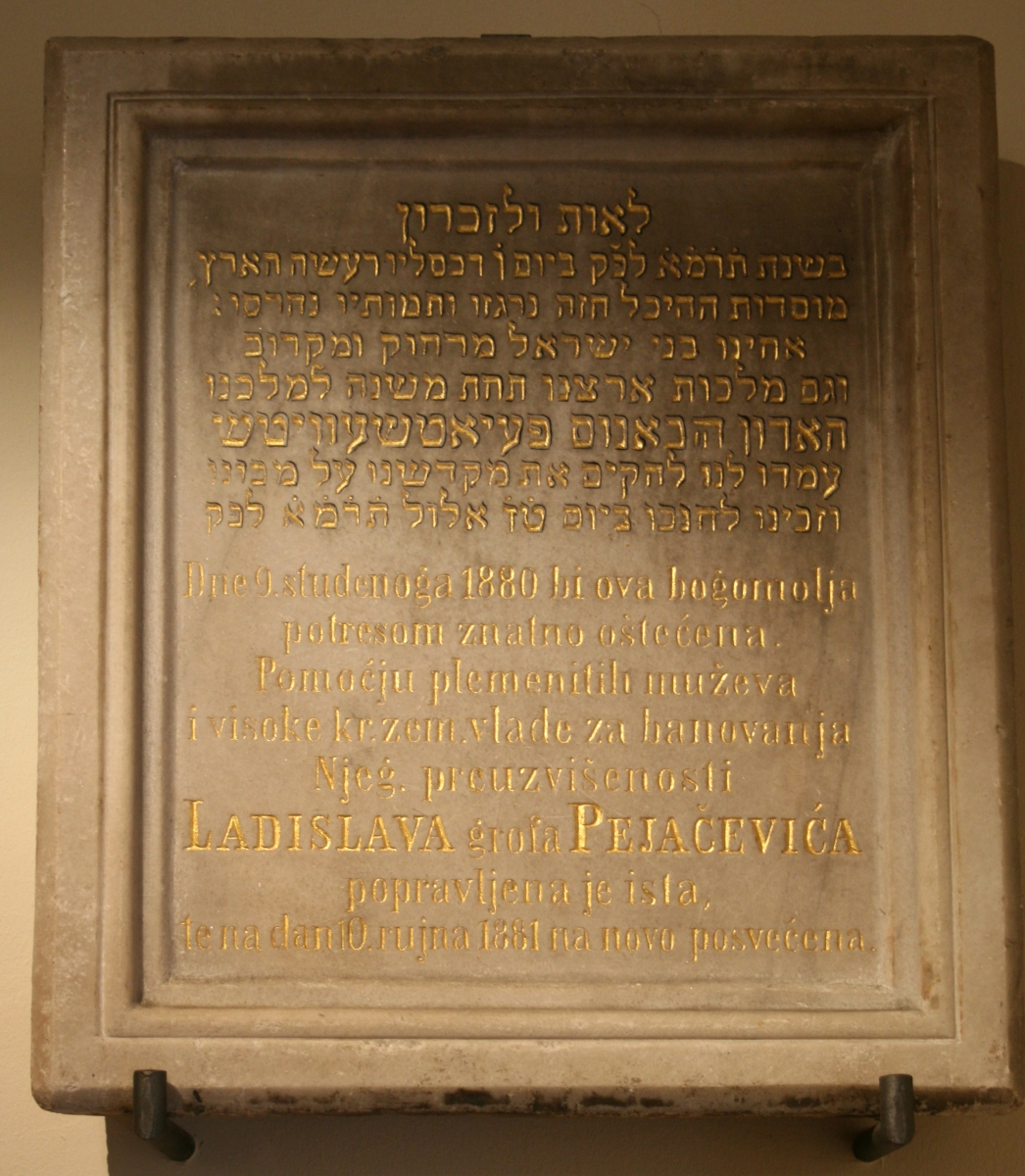
One of the surviving memorial tables, on display at the Zagreb City Museum, marked the occasion of reconsecration after the 1881 repair.

With the new synagogue, an organ was introduced into religious service. The small minority of Orthodox Jews found this change to be intolerable, and they began to hold their services separately, in rented rooms.

In the 1880 earthquake, the synagogue suffered minor damage and was repaired the following year.

Largely due to immigration from Hungary, Bohemia and Moravia, the Jewish population of Zagreb quickly grew in size: from 1,285 members in 1887 to 3,237 members in 1900, and then to 5,970 members in 1921. The synagogue became too small to accommodate the needs of the ever-growing community. In 1921 a renovation was undertaken to increase the number of available seats. A 1931 plan to increase the capacity to 944 seats was ultimately abandoned. A central heating system was installed in 1933.

=== Demolition during World War II ===
During the 1941 collapse of the Kingdom of Yugoslavia under the Axis invasion in the April War, the Independent State of Croatia was created. It was ruled by the extreme nationalist Ustaša regime. The Ustaša quickly started with the systematic persecution of the Jews, modeled after the Nazi Germany approach, and at times even more brutal. Racial laws were introduced, Jewish property was confiscated, and the Jews were subjected to mass arrests and deportations to death camps in Croatia and abroad.

Demolition in 1941.

In October 1941, the newly installed mayor of Zagreb, Ivan Werner, issued a decree ordering the demolition of the Praška Street synagogue, ostensibly because it did not fit into the city's master plan. The demolition began on October 10, 1941, proceeding slowly so as not to damage the adjacent buildings; it was finished by April 1942. The whole process was photographed for propaganda purposes, and the photographs were shown to the public at an antisemitic exhibition first held in Zagreb. It was also shown in Dubrovnik, Karlovac, Sarajevo, Vukovar and Zemun, as an illustration of the "solution of the Jewish question in Croatia".

A fragment of the film footage of the demolition was discovered five decades later by the film director Lordan Zafranović during research for his 1993 documentary feature, Decline of the Century: Testimony of L. Z.; 41 seconds of the film survives. This footage was also shown in Mira Wolf's documentary, The Zagreb Synagogue 1867-1942 (1996), produced by Croatian Radiotelevision.

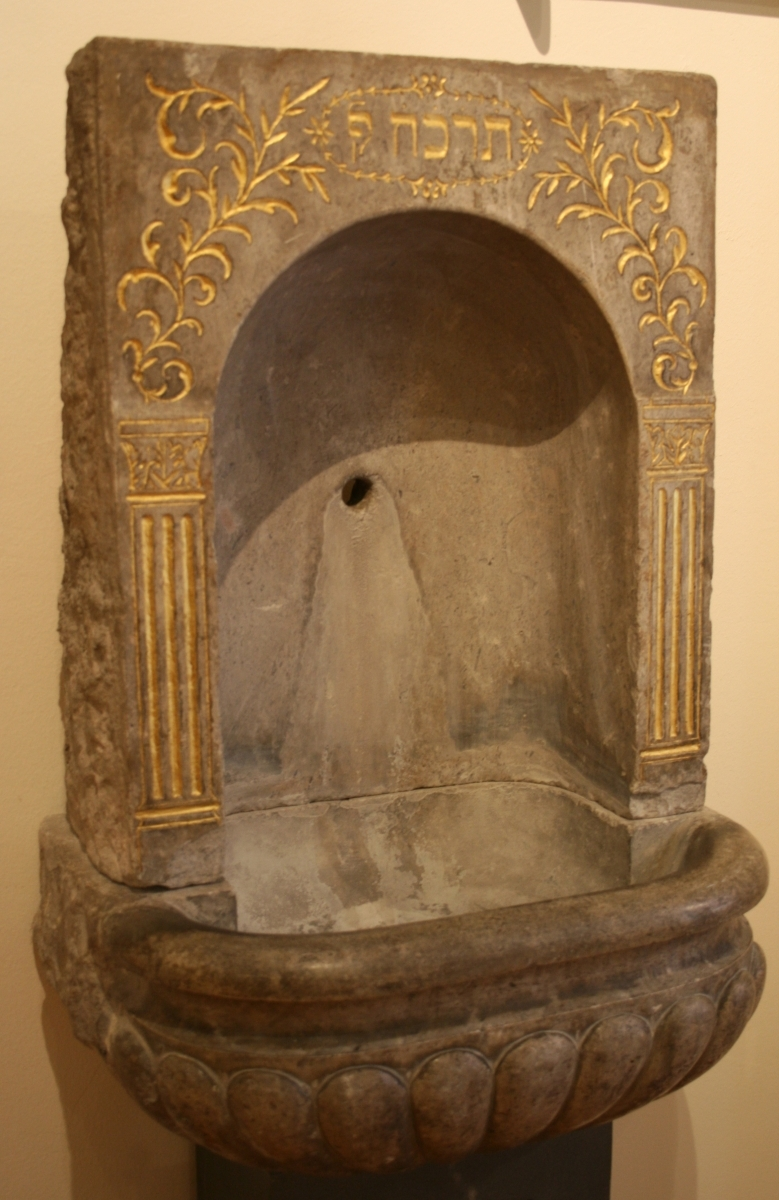
The synagogue's wash-basin was salvaged from the rubble after the end of World War II.

The synagogue's eight valuable Torah scrolls were saved due to an intervention by Leonardo Grivičić, an entrepreneur and industrialist who lived next door from Mile Budak, a minister in the Ustaša government. He was also close to Poglavnik Ante Pavelić and the Third Reich's ambassador to Croatia, Edmund Glaise-Horstenau. Although Grivičić did not have a significant political role in the Independent State of Croatia, he was considered trustworthy. On October 9, 1941, he learned about the regime's plan to start the demolition of the synagogue on the following morning. By that evening, Grivičić secretly relayed the information to the synagogue's chief cantor, Grüner, and during the night, the Torah scrolls were moved to safety.

Shortly after the destruction of the synagogue, the Catholic archbishop of Zagreb Aloysius Stepinac delivered a homily in which he said: "A house of God of any faith is a holy thing, and whoever harms it will pay with their lives. In this world and the next they will be punished.".

The only surviving fragments of the building — the wash-basin and two memorial tables from the forecourt, as well as some parts of a column — were saved by Ivo Kraus. He pulled them from the rubble shortly after the end of World War II. The wash-basin and the memorial tables are now in the Zagreb City Museum. The column fragments are kept by the Jewish Community of Zagreb.

== Reconstruction efforts ==
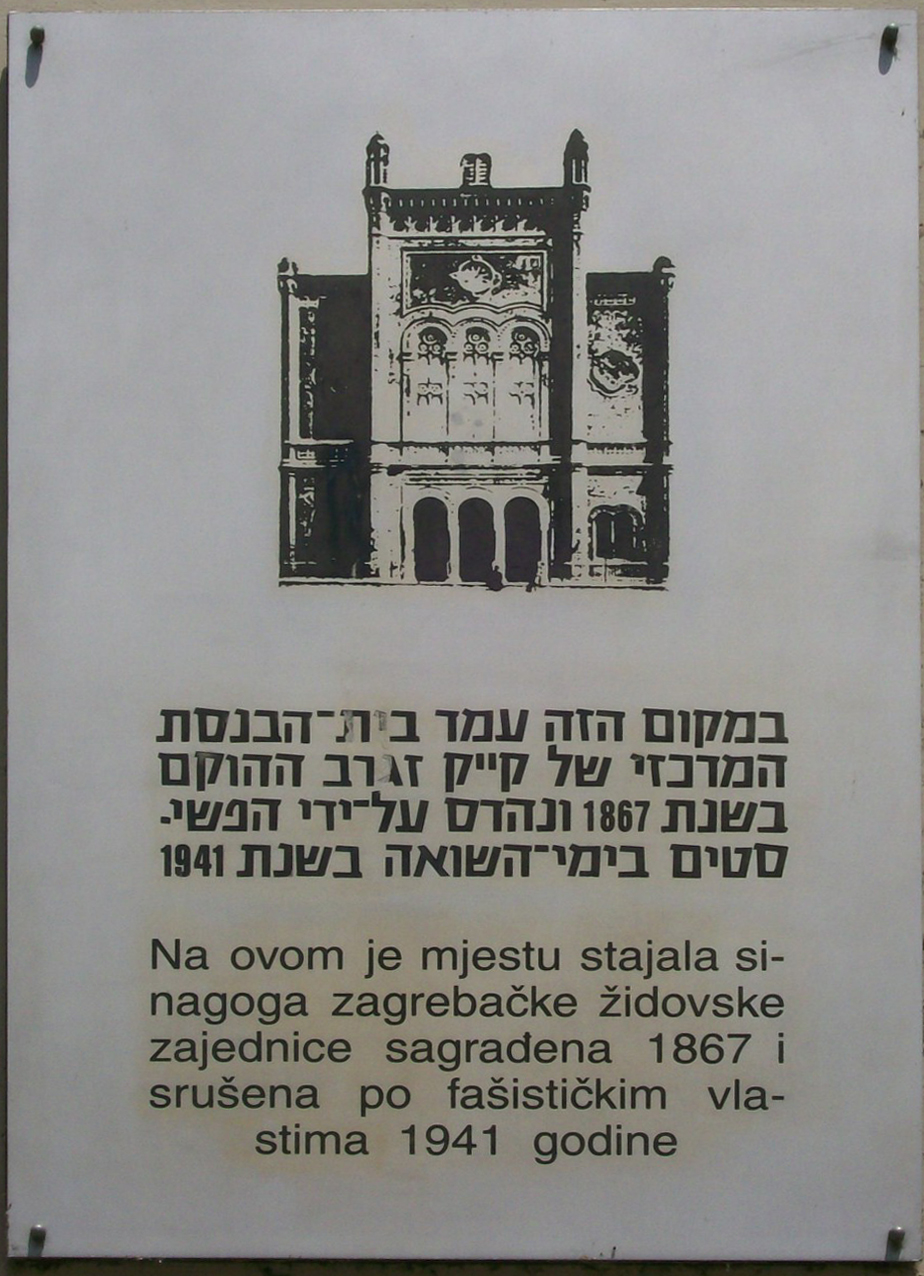
A memorial plaque in Hebrew and Croatian at 7 Praška Street, unveiled in 1986, marks the site of the former synagogue.

=== 1945–1990 ===
Only one in five Croatian Jews survived the Holocaust of World War II. Between 1948 and 1952, nearly one half of the surviving members of Jewish Community of Zagreb opted for emigration to Israel, and the community dropped to one-tenth of its pre-war membership. The Yugoslav communist regime nationalized virtually all real estate owned by the Jewish Community of Zagreb, including the plot in Praška Street. All this, combined with the new regime's general hostility toward religion, made reconstruction of the synagogue nearly impossible.

After World War II, the vacant site of the former synagogue was used as a makeshift volleyball court. The volleyball court made way for a prefabricated department store building, constructed in 1959. The department store was completely destroyed in a fire on December 31, 1980, and was subsequently dismantled. Despite some earlier ideas about a permanent department store building on the same spot, and a 1977 architecture competition for its design, no construction took place. Instead, the parcel was turned into a parking lot, which it remains to this day.

After 1986, the Jewish Community of Zagreb began to consider a Jewish cultural center and a memorial synagogue. Two architects, Branko Silađin and Boris Morsan, both of whom participated in the failed 1977 department store competition, came forward on their own accord and contributed their ideas for a new Jewish center in Praška Street. Silađin's vision was ultimately not accepted by the Jewish community; instead, plans were being made for the construction of the cultural center and a synagogue, following an international architecture competition. However, despite support for the project both within Yugoslavia and abroad, the issuance of necessary permits was either stalled or denied by the municipal government. The project was not developed.

=== 1990–present ===
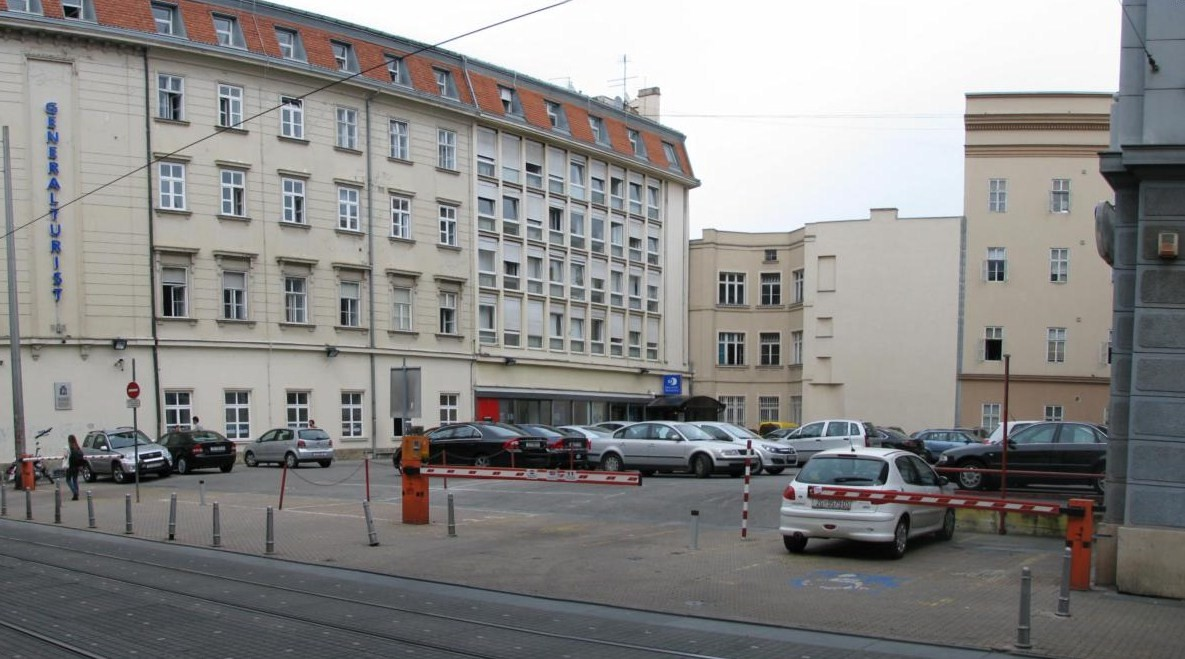
A parking lot in Praška Street, where the synagogue was located.

By the autumn of 1990, after the first democratic elections in Croatia, the municipal government finally approved the project. An architectural competition was planned for January 1991. Political turmoil in the country, followed by the breakup of Yugoslavia and the Croatian War of Independence (1991–1995), caused the project to be put on hold again. In 1994 President of Croatia Franjo Tuđman said to Jakov Bienenfeld, Council member of the Zagreb Jewish community, that they should build the new synagogue at the site of the former synagogue, which will be funded by the Croatian government. Bienenfeld declined the offer believing to be inappropriate when a great number of churches are left destroyed at the time, during Croatian War of Independence.

In the meantime, the Jewish Community of Zagreb sought to legally reacquire its property. The Croatian denationalization law was enacted in 1996, and the Praška Street parcel was finally returned to the community on December 31, 1999. By 2000, reconstruction activities were invigorated again. An investment study was submitted to the Government of Croatia and the City of Zagreb in July 2004 and revised in October 2004. The architecture competition was planned for 2005. However, a 2005 rift in the Jewish Community of Zagreb resulted in formation of a splinter Jewish community, Bet Israel, led by Ivo and Slavko Goldstein.

In September 2006, the Government of Croatia formed a construction workgroup. It was decided that the project, estimated at the time at HRK 173 million (US$ 30 million), would be partially financed by the Government of Croatia and the City of Zagreb, and that both Jewish organizations should be represented in the workgroup. However, the involvement of Bet Israel was deemed unacceptable by the Jewish Community of Zagreb, which is the sole owner of the Praška Street property, and which also sees itself as the sole legal representative of the Zagreb Jewish community. As a consequence, the community and its president, Ognjen Kraus, refused further participation in the project under the set conditions.

Further disagreements existed about the design and character of the new building. Facsimile reconstruction, while feasible, was not seriously contemplated. There was a general agreement that the new building should also have a cultural as well as commercial purpose. While the Jewish Community of Zagreb envisioned a modern design reminiscent of the original synagogue, the Bet Israel advocated building a replica of the original synagogue's facade, perceiving it as having a powerful symbolism. Opinions of architects, urban planners, and art historians were also divided along similar lines.

In 2014 and 2015, the Jewish Community of Zagreb presented new plans for a 10,600 m^{2} (114,000 sq ft) multi-purpose Jewish center and synagogue in Praška Street. In a 2021 interview, Ognjen Kraus confirmed there were plans for rebuilding the synagogue, but expressed frustration with lack of engagement from the city and government, especially after the 2020 Zagreb earthquake.

== See also ==
- History of the Jews in Croatia
- List of synagogues in Croatia
