= Church of St. George, Varaždin =

Serbian Orthodox church in Varaždin, Croatia

Church of St. George
- Crkva svetog Đorđa; Црква светог Ђорђа
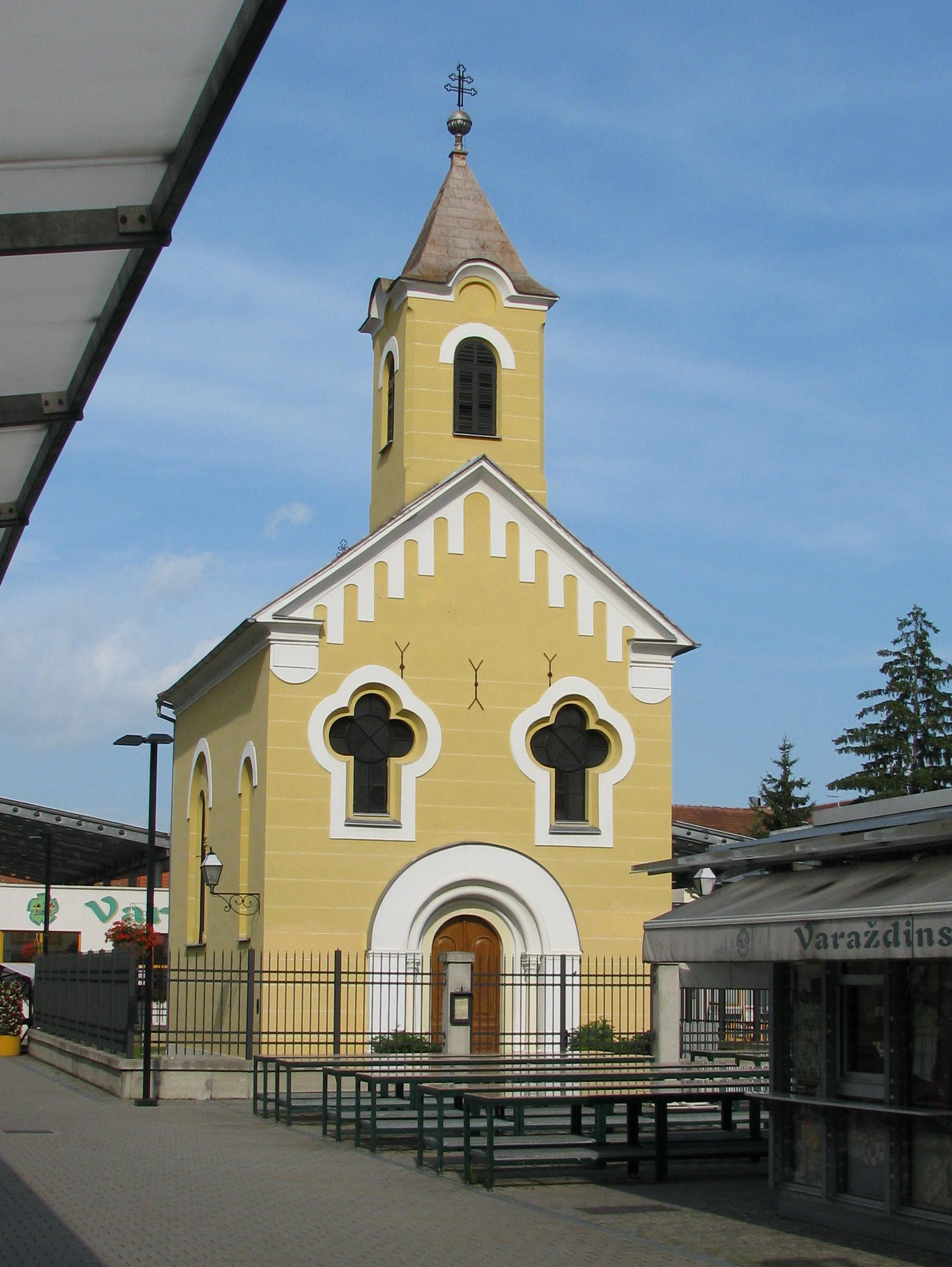
- Church of Saint George, pictured in 2009
- Church of St. George
- 46°18′36.5″N 16°20′21″E
- Location: Varaždin
- Country: Croatia
- Denomination: Serbian Orthodox Church

History
- Dedication: Saint George

Architecture
- Completed: 1884

Administration
- Archdiocese: Metropolitanate of Zagreb and Ljubljana

The Church of St. George is an Eastern Orthodox church located in Varaždin, Croatia. It is under jurisdiction of the Metropolitanate of Zagreb and Ljubljana of the Serbian Orthodox Church. The church is located inside of Varaždin's main market place.

== History ==
Work on church were completed in 1884.

Church of St. George in is one of the youngest Orthodox sacral buildings constructed in Croatian urban areas in the 19th century. After the 1781 Patent of Toleration issued by Joseph II, the first larger Orthodox churches began to be built in towns and cities of Croatia (Karlovac, Zagreb, Rijeka, Bjelovar, Koprivnica) and the Habsburg empire as a whole. Complete removal of limitations for non-Catholic religions in the 1850s and 1860s led to a new wave of church construction immediately after the mid-19th century in the Eparchy of Osječko polje and Baranja, not to mention Otočac, Ogulin and other places of the empire where Serbs are considered people of a constituent state. Since the Varaždin Serbian Orthodox community was rather small, the church was constructed fairly late, in 1884, primarily owing to the circumstances such as the Orthodox religion of the officials who then had high positions in the county and city administration: Ognjeslav Utješenović Ostrožinski was the head of Varaždin County and Milan Vrabčevića was the mayor of the city of Varaždin. Belonging to the political and cultural elite of Croatia of the time, they ensured all necessary permits and funds for the church construction. Their efforts were also supported by the very emperor Franz Joseph I.

== Architecture ==
The church, built according to the designs of Žigo Baločanski (and executed by Radoslav Atzinger) is a special interpretation of Neo-Byzantine style, with strong Neo-Romanesque elements. The interior equipment is incomparably more interesting. The donation the church received consisted of old Biedermeier equipment from the early decades of the 19th century (probably between 1813 and 1828) that was moved from the Orthodox church in Zagreb and included an iconostasis, two choir stalls, pews, three small window panes, and a big crystal chandelier. The only change being made on the iconostasis after its move to Varaždin was the removal of one vertical row of icons on each of its wings due to the smaller width of the church.

== See also ==
- List of Serbian Orthodox churches in Croatia
- Metropolitanate of Zagreb and Ljubljana
- Serbs of Croatia
