= Jovan Pavlović =

Serbian metropolitan (1936–2014)

Metropolitan Jovan Pavlović
- Metropolitan of Zagreb and Ljubljana
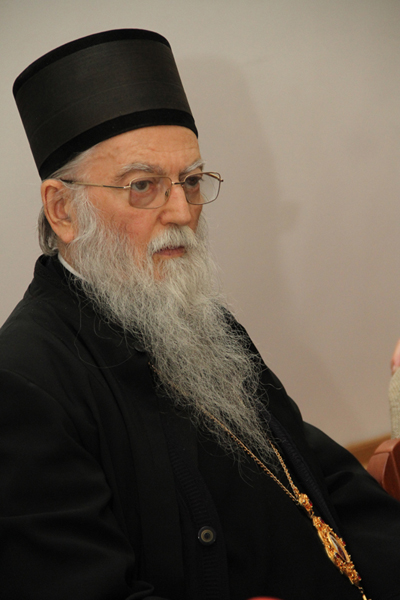
- Bishop Jovan in 2010
- Church: Serbian Orthodox Church
- Metropolis: Metropolitanate of Zagreb and Ljubljana
- Installed: 1982
- Term ended: 3 April 2014
- Predecessor: Damaskin (Grdanički)
- Successor: Porfirije (Perić)

Personal details
- Born: Joco Pavlović; 22 October 1936 Medinci, Sava Banovina, Yugoslavia (modern Croatia)
- Died: 3 April 2014 (aged 77) Zagreb, Croatia
- Denomination: Eastern Orthodoxy
- Education: University of Belgrade; Kiel University; LMU Munich

Jovan Pavlović (Serbian Cyrillic: Јован Павловић; 22 October 1936 – 3 April 2014) was a Serbian Orthodox prelate who was the metropolitan bishop of Zagreb and Ljubljana of the Serbian Orthodox Church from 1982 until his death in 2014. He was one of the most prominent individuals in Serbian community in Croatia during his lifetime.

Jovan was born in the village of Medinci in 1936 and died in the Sisters of Charity Hospital in Zagreb on 3 April 2014. He was the highest representative of the Serbian Orthodox Church in Croatia for more than two decades.

== Early life and education ==
Jovan was born in Medinci, Yugoslavia on 22 October 1936. He finished elementary school in Medinci and secondary in Podravska Slatina. After he completed his seminary education at Rakovica Monastery he graduated at University of Belgrade Faculty of Orthodox Theology in 1963. For postgraduate studies he attended universities in West Germany: he studied Evangelical theology at the Evangelical Academy in Schleswig and the Faculty of Theology of Kiel University, and he studied Catholic theology at LMU Munich. During this period, he spent some time in Chevetogne Abbey in Belgium and St. Matthias' Abbey and Niederaltaich Abbey in Germany.

Jovan worked as a professor in the Serbian Orthodox Seminary of Prizren and in Krka monastery. In 1967, in Krka he became a monk and in 1969 a hierodeacon. In 1977, he became bishop of Lepavina Monastery and Metropolitan of Zagreb in 1982.

== Metropolitan of Zagreb and Ljubljana (1982–2014) ==
Between 1982 and 1992 Metropolitan Jovan was the representative of the Serbian Orthodox Church at World Council of Churches. He was member of the Holy Synod of the Serbian Orthodox Church in several mandates. Serbian Orthodox churches in Italy were also under his jurisdiction from 1994 to 2011.

== Awards and recognition ==
- Croatian Helsinki Committee Award for promotion of inter-religious dialogue and religious tolerance.

Eastern Orthodox Church titles
Vacant Title last held by Damaskin Grdanički	Metropolitan Bishop of Zagreb and Ljubljana; 1982–2014	Succeeded by Porfirije Perić
