= Church of St. George, Grubišno Polje =

Serbian Orthodox church in Grubišno Polje, Croatia

Church of St. George
- Crkva svetog Georgija; Црква светог Георгија
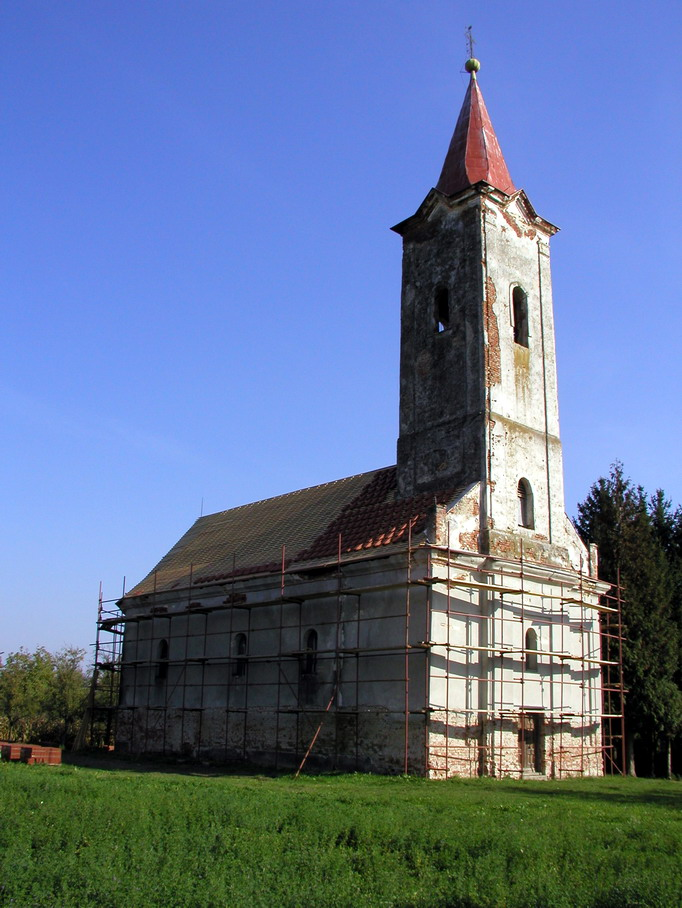
- Church of St. George
- Church of St. George
- 45°42′12.5″N 17°10′35″E
- Location: Grubišno Polje
- Country: Croatia
- Denomination: Serbian Orthodox Church

History
- Dedication: St George

Architecture
- Completed: 1775

The Church of St. George is a Serbian Orthodox church in Grubišno Polje, Croatia. The church was built between 1773 and 1775 after imperial permission was acquired, and was renovated in 1820 and after World War II. The Orthodox cemetery previously housed a chapel dedicated to Emperor Constantine and Empress Helen, which was destroyed during World War II. After the end of Croatian War of Independence orthodox churches in the area of Grubišno Polje have been protected as historical monuments, and restoration efforts began in 2003. Regular services have been reintroduced since 2005. There are inications that the church in Grubišno Polje occupies the same site as a previous wooden church that fell into disrepair with historical sources indicating churches of St. Stephen the King and St. Nicholas from 1334 and 1501 at unknown locations.

== See also ==
- List of Serbian Orthodox churches in Croatia
