= D213 road =

Road in Croatia

D213 state road

Route information
- Length: 26.7 km (16.6 mi)

Major junctions
- From: Erdut border crossing to Serbia
- To: D2 near Osijek

Location
- Country: Croatia
- Counties: Osijek-Baranja
- Major cities: Dalj

Highway system
- Highways in Croatia

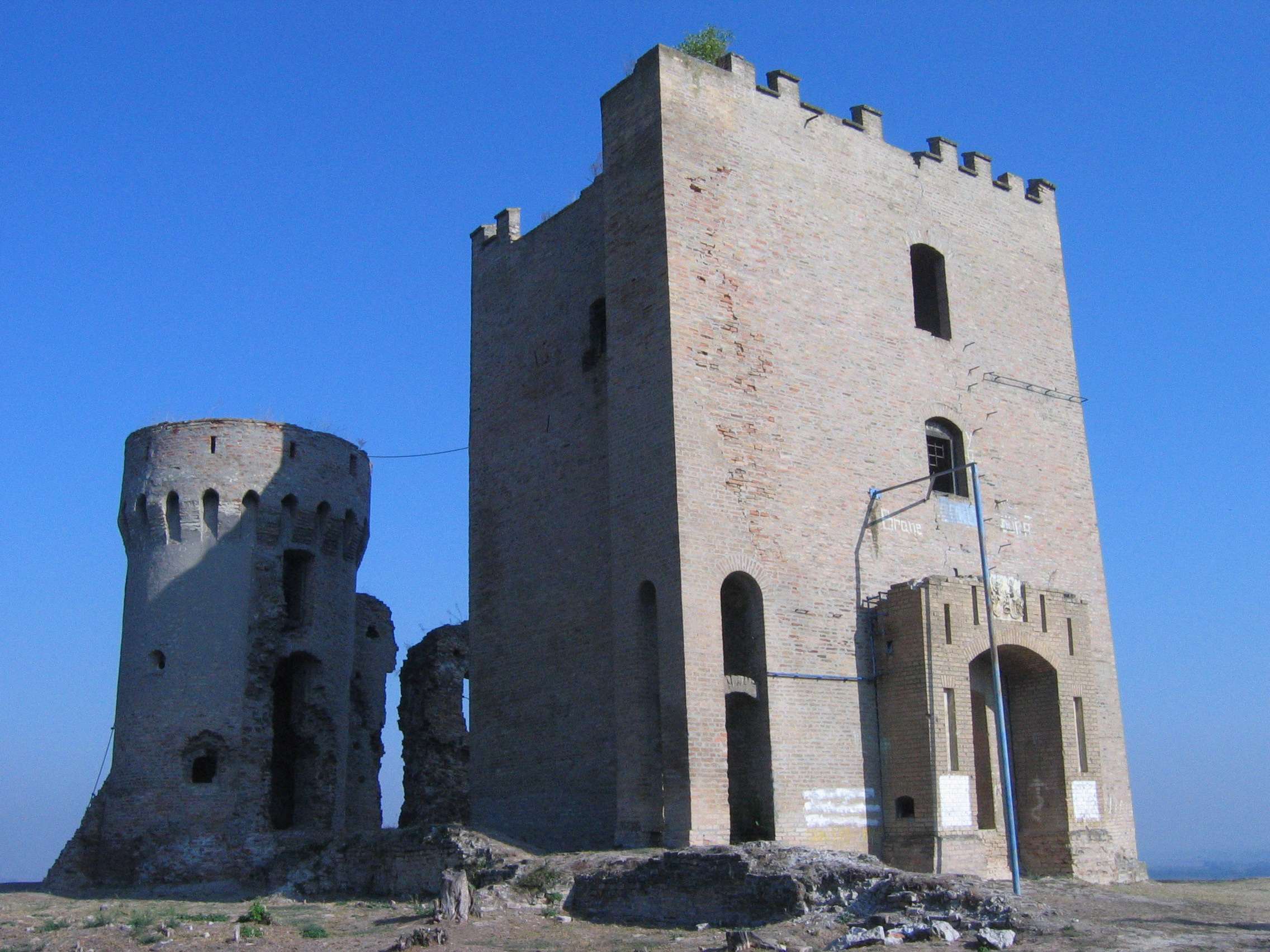
Erdut Castle, in vicinity of the D213 road

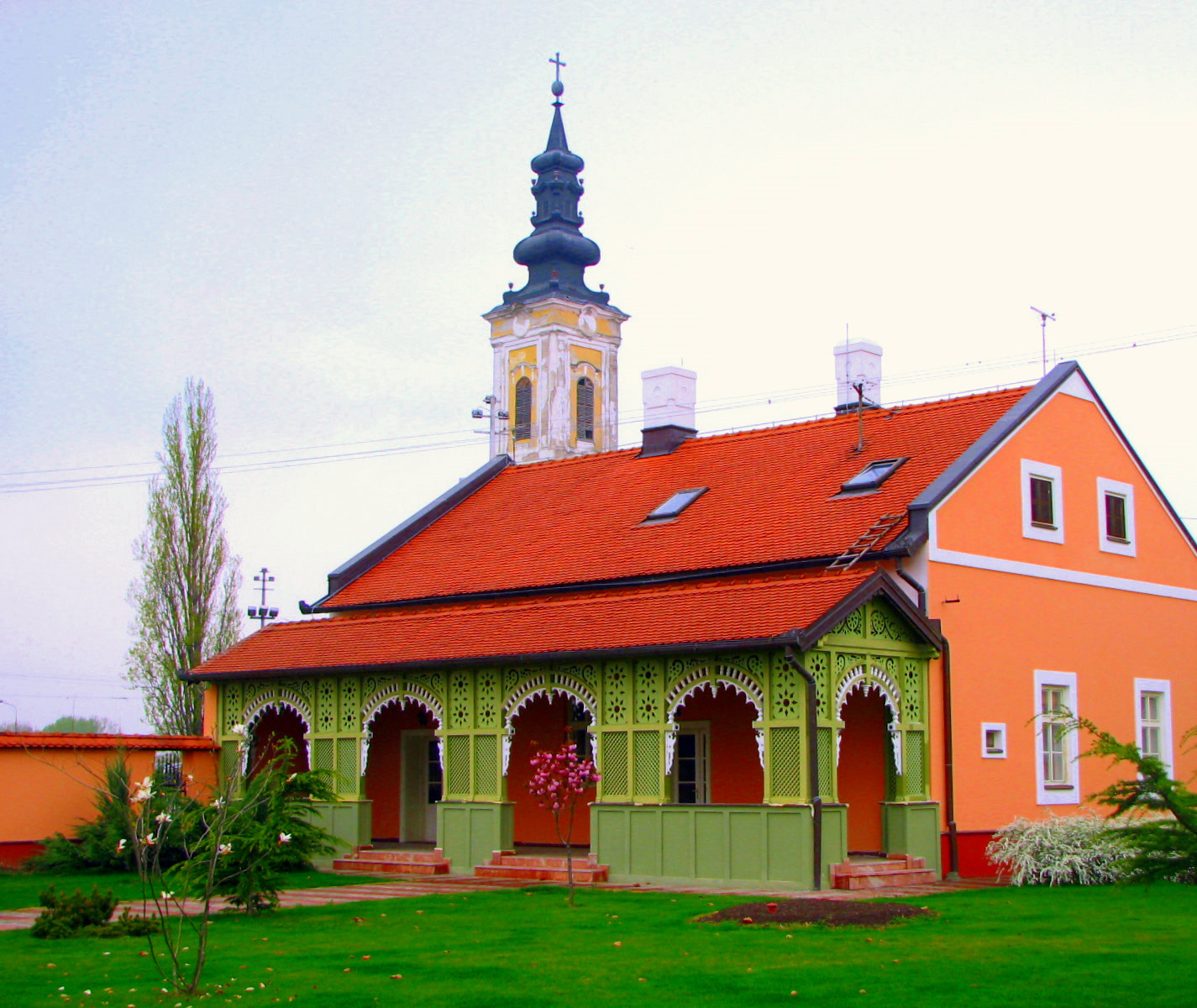
Eparchy of Osječko polje and Baranja in vicinity of the D213 road

D213 is a state road in Slavonia region of Croatia connecting Dalj and nearby Erdut border crossing to Serbia to D2 state road east of Osijek. The road is 26.7 km (16.6 mi) long.

The road, as well as all other state roads in Croatia, is managed and maintained by Hrvatske ceste, state owned company.

== Traffic volume ==
Traffic is regularly counted and reported by Hrvatske ceste, operator of the road.

D213 traffic volume
Road	Counting site	AADT	ASDT	Notes
D213	2511 Bijelo Brdo	3,500	4,246	Adjacent to the L44084 junction. The AADT figure is an estimate by Hrvatske ceste.
D213	2601 Erdut	1,647	1,911	Adjacent to the D519 junction.

== Road junctions and populated areas ==
D213 junctions/populated areas
Type	Slip roads/Notes
	D2 to Osijek and Našice (to the west) and to Vukovar (to the east). The western terminus of the road.
	Ž4068 to Nemetin and Osijek.
	Sarvaš
	Bijelo Brdo; L44084 to Bijelo Brdo railway station (within the village).
	D519 to Dalj and Borovo Naselje (D2).
	Ž4093 to Erdut.
	Erdut; Ž4093 to the town centre. The Ž4093 loops back to the D213 forming another intersection with the latter west of Erdut.
	Erdut border crossing to Serbia. Serbian State Road 17 to Bogojevo, Vojvodina, Serbia. The eastern terminus of the road.
