= Vukovar–Borovo Naselje railway station =

Railway station in Croatia

Vukovar–Borovo Naselje
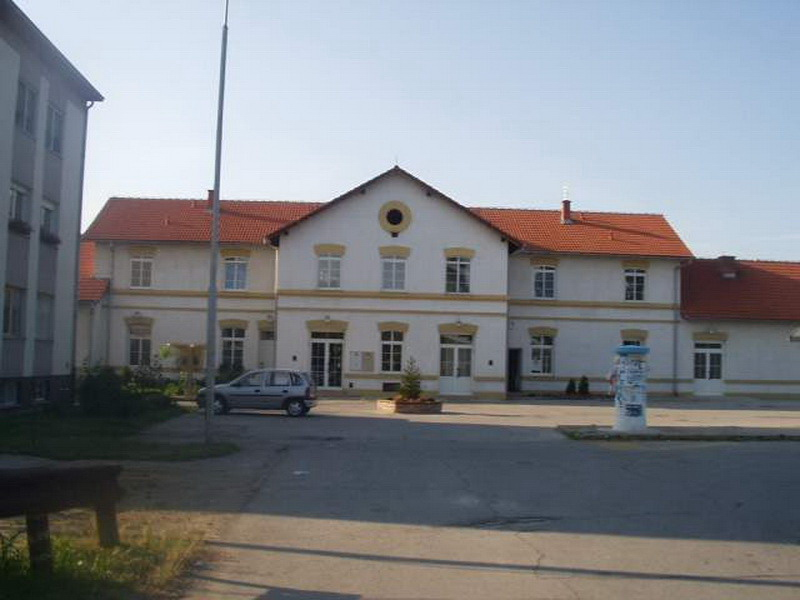
- railway station

General information
- Location: Borovo Naselje; Vukovar-Srijem County; Croatia
- Coordinates: 45.3733°N 18.9552°E
- Operator: Croatian Railways
- Connections: Public transport available

Construction
- Parking: Limited free public parking
Location

Vukovar–Borovo Naselje railway station (Croatian: Željeznički kolodvor Vukovar–Borovo Naselje, Serbian Cyrillic: Железничка станица Вуковар–Борово Насеље) is a railway station in Croatia. The station is operated by Croatian Railways, the state-owned railway company. It is located in Borovo Naselje. It is one of two active railway stations in the city of Vukovar, the other is the Vukovar railway station closer to the city center in the area of the Port of Vukovar, and the third station, the railway station Stari Vukovar In the city district of Sajmište, is out of service, due to the cancellation of the railway to Tovarnik on the border with Republic of Serbia. Station Vukovar - Borovo Naselje serves as the primary train station in Vukovar connected to the Vinkovci railway station, the second largest station in Croatia after Zagreb Glavni kolodvor. Local train to Vinkovci stops at local train station in Bršadin (Bršadin-Lipovača train station), Pačetin (Bršadin train station) and Nuštar (Nuštar train station).
