= D519 road =

Road in Croatia

D519 state road

Route information
- Length: 16.2 km (10.1 mi)

Major junctions
- From: D213 near Dalj
- To: D2 in Borovo Naselje

Location
- Country: Croatia
- Counties: Osijek-Baranja, Vukovar-Syrmia
- Major cities: Dalj, Borovo Naselje

Highway system
- Highways in Croatia

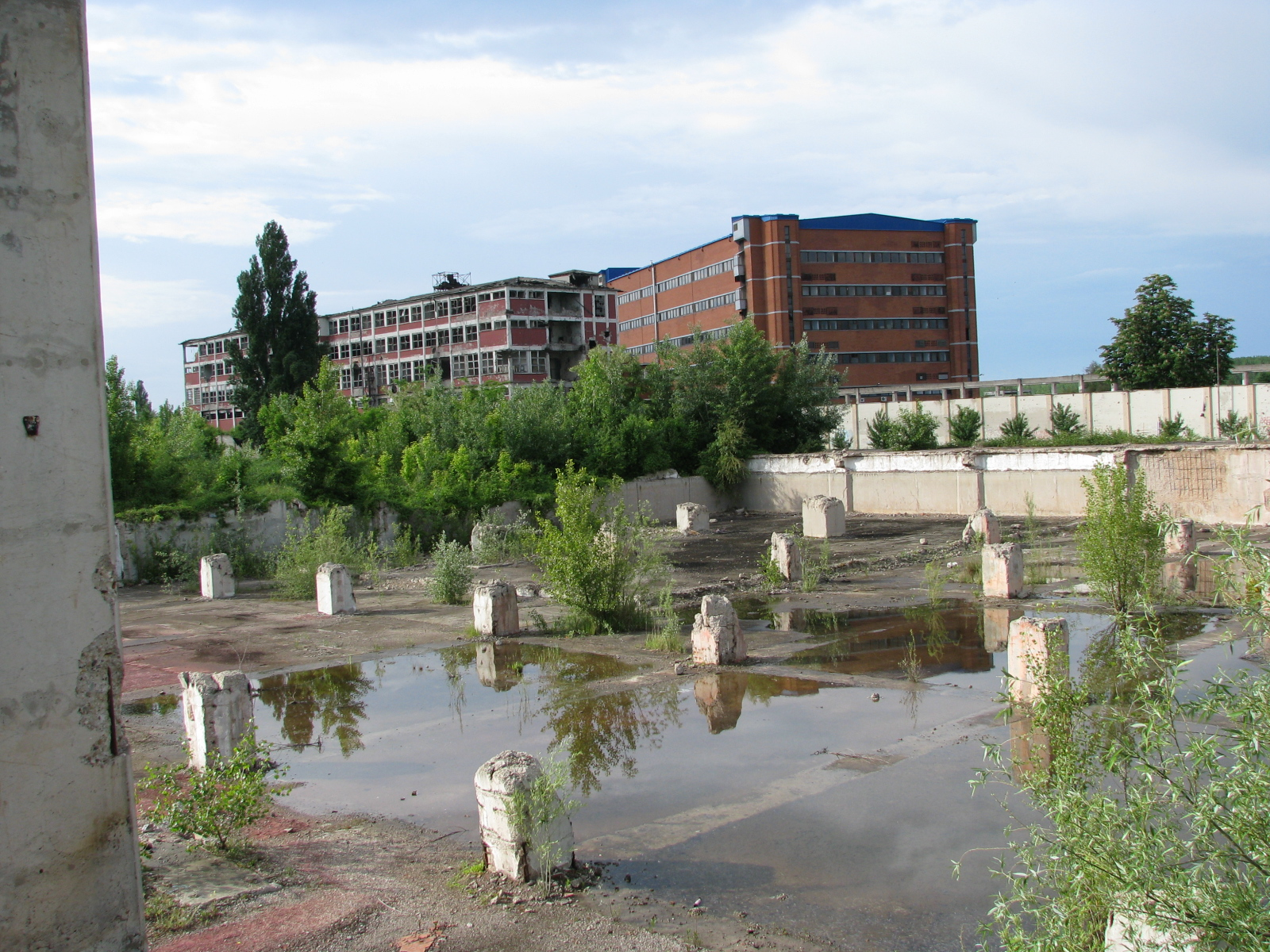
Borovo Naselje, Borovo Commerce building near the D519 road exhibiting war damage

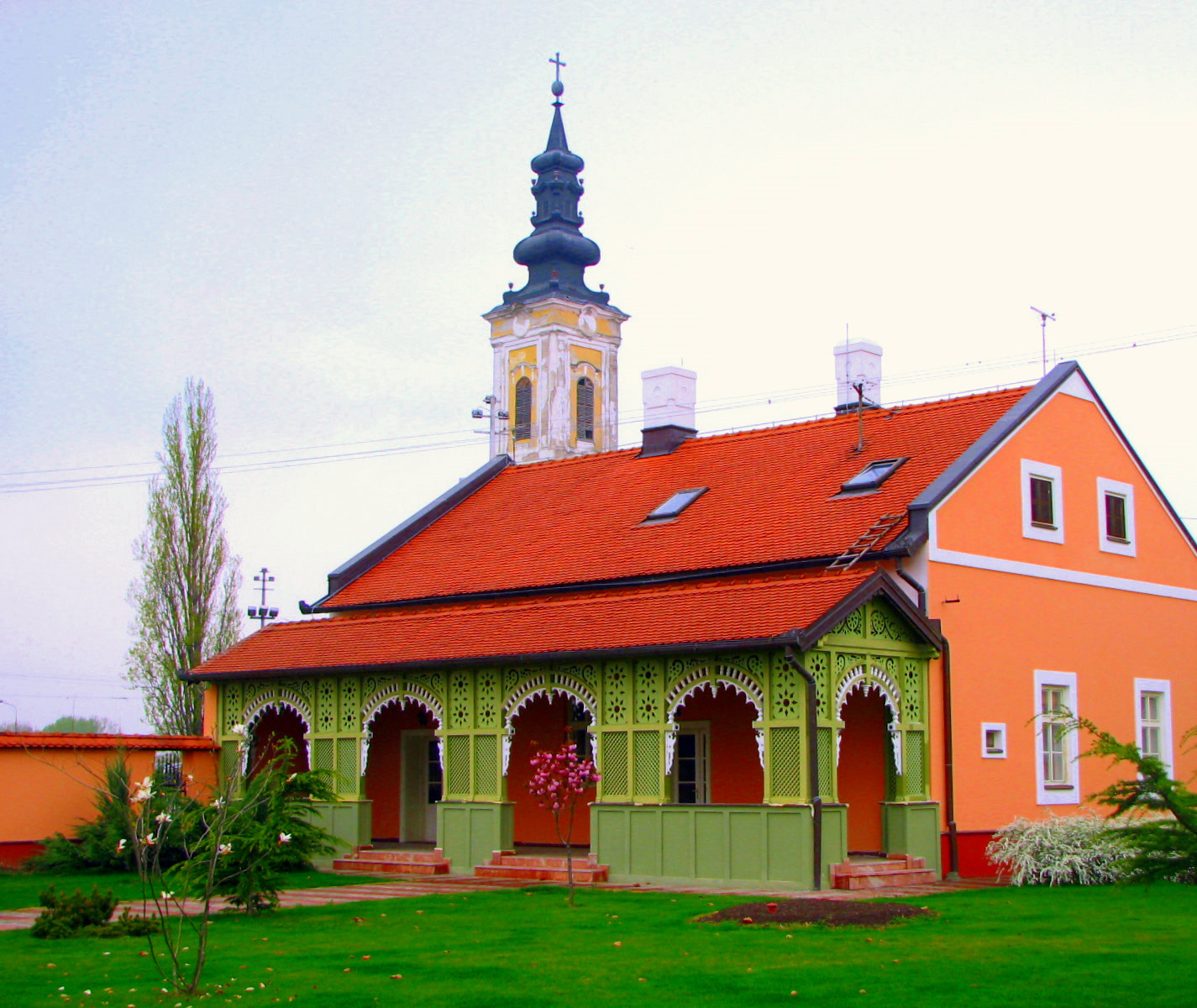
Eparchy of Osječko polje and Baranja, Dalj on the D519 road

D519 is a state road in Slavonia region of Croatia connecting Dalj and nearby Vukovar via Borovo Naselje and the D2 state road. The road is 16.2 km (10.1 mi) long.

The road, as well as all other state roads in Croatia, is managed and maintained by Hrvatske ceste, state owned company.

== Traffic volume ==
Traffic is regularly counted and reported by Hrvatske ceste, operator of the road.

D519 traffic volume
Road	Counting site	AADT	ASDT	Notes
D519	3704 Borovo - north	1,539	1,954	Adjacent to the L46003 junction.

== Road junctions and populated areas ==
D519 junctions/populated areas
Type	Slip roads/Notes
	D213 to Osijek (to the west) and to Erdut and Erdut border crossing to Serbia (to the east). The northern terminus of the road.
	Dalj
	Borovo
	Ž4068 to Nemetin and Osijek.
	Borovo Naselje; D2 to Osijek (to the west) and to Vukovar and Ilok (to the east). L46003 to D2 state road as an alternate connection. The southern terminus of the road.
