= Novi Vukovar railway station =

Railway station in Croatia

Novi Vukovar

General information
- Location: Priljevo ul. 2 Vukovar-Srijem County; Croatia
- Coordinates: 45.36194°N 18.98754°E
- Operated by: Croatian Railways
- Connections: Public transport available

Construction
- Parking: Limited free public parking
Location

Novi Vukovar railway station (Croatian: Željeznički kolodvor Novi Vukovar, Serbian Cyrillic: Железничка станица Нови Вуковар) is a railway station in Croatia. It is located at Priljevo Street in Vukovar, in the area of the Port of Vukovar on the Danube river. The station is operated by Croatian Railways.

The station is one of two active railway stations in Vukovar, the other being Vukovar–Borovo Naselje railway station. It primarily serves the southern part of the city and provides a rail connection between the Port of Vukovar and the wider Croatian railway network via the Vinkovci railway junction, enabling both freight and passenger transport.

== History ==
Built back in 1891, this standard-type building belongs to the architecture of the Hungarian State Railways. It is a freestanding single-story structure with a prominent central risalit and a porch facing the platforms. It consists of a basement, ground floor, and upper floor. The façades are plastered with brick accents, and the interior of the building featured a wooden spiral staircase, wooden ceilings, and white joinery. The wooden porch with a canopy, facing the platforms, had not only a functional role but also an aesthetic value. The building sustained damage during the Croatian War of Independence and has largely remained unrestored since that period.

=== The "Train of Peace" (Vlak mira) ===
On 8 June 1997, the station served as a central location for a symbolic event marking the peaceful reintegration of Croatia's eastern Danube region. The "Train of Peace" (Vlak mira), transporting approximately 2,000 returning residents of Vukovar along with Croatian President Franjo Tuđman and various officials and dignitaries, arrived from Zagreb via Vinkovci.

A commemorative ceremony was held at the station, attended by thousands of people, representatives of national minorities, and members of UNTAES.

=== Renovation ===
The station building is one of the remaining war‑damaged structures in Vukovar. It has been described as one of the last war ruins in the city, and despite technical documentation for its reconstruction being prepared over a decade ago, renovation has still not begun and is not planned in the near future according to local officials. At the time, the cost of the works was estimated at approximately 7.5 million Croatian kuna.

The station's platform area and passenger facilities have been modernized, including a covered shelter, a raised platform, an access ramp, updated signalling, and electronic passenger information systems.
