= Bijelo Brdo culture =

Medieval archaeological culture in Europe

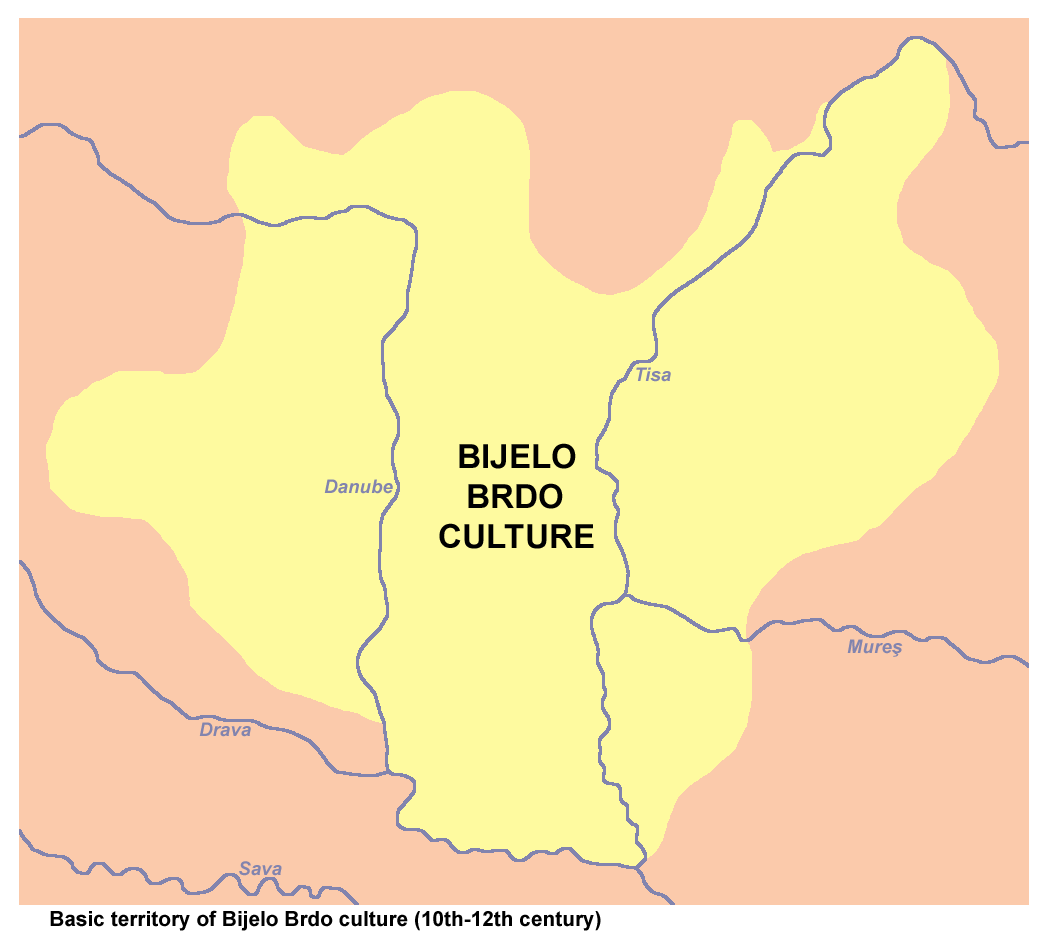
Map showing the basic territory of Bijelo Brdo culture (10th-12th century), according to the book of Russian archaeologist Valentin Sedov. The area of the village of Bijelo Brdo, Croatia itself is missing.

The Bijelo Brdo culture, or Bjelo-Brdo culture, is a medieval archaeological culture flourishing in the 10th and 12th centuries in Central Europe. It represents a synthesis of Pannonian-Middle Danubian post-Avar culture existing in the territory (in present-day Croatia, Hungary, Romania, Serbia and Slovakia) before the Hungarian conquest and those introduced in the Carpathian Basin by the conquering Hungarians in the early 10th century.

== Name ==
It is named after an archaeological site, a medieval graveyard found in the village of Bijelo Brdo, Croatia, near Osijek, which was first excavated in 1895. The name of the culture is attributed to Lubor Niederle (1921). By 2021, the term is mostly used in Croatia (due to close cultural analogies and to differentiate archaeological material in continental Croatia from the old Croatian-Dalmatian culture), and in Serbia, Slovakia and Romania, but mostly out of use in Hungary, as in "the last few decades, a tendency can be noted to avoid the use of older terms containing the names of regions or sites which suggest the place of origin of a given archaeological phenomenon, and to replace them with chronological or historical designations".

=== Definition ===
The existence of the Bijelo Brdo culture itself is matter of debate, as the conception of the archaeological culture in the late Early Middle Ages-High Middle Ages is outdated, as well its chronology, the question of continuity and discontinuity, ethnic identification and interpretation. Its vast area of findings from Eastern Alps, Eastern Adriatic, Moravia and border of Ukraine, over several distinctive medieval principalities and ethnic groups, is opposing the traditional approach of culture-historical archaeology through which lens is researched. Recently archaeologist Krešimir Filipec negated it "as an archaeological culture and believing that it is simply a fashion of the time and that it should be given a new and neutral name". Milica Radišić as an alternative proposed "culture of the Árpád period".

== Geography ==
The basic territory of Bijelo Brdo culture included parts of present-day Hungary, Transylvania, southern Slovakia, and part of the Serbian northern region of Vojvodina. Outside the core area, V. V. Sedov considered the existence of local cultural varieties which were influenced by Bijelo Brdo culture. They are also understood as Bijelo Brdo-types, or belonging to the Bijelo Brdo culture area. The largest site in the Carpathian Basin is from Majs-Udvar in the Hungarian part of Baranya.

Archaeologists often use term "Bijelo Brdo culture" for early medieval culture in Lower Pannonia (between Sava, Drava, Mura and Danube rivers). Its influence was present since the 10th century in Carantania in Slovenia, and Kingdom of Croatia (as well northern and western parts of Bosnia and Herzegovina).

== Dating ==
Zdeněk Váňa divided the culture into three phases, "old" (975–1025), "middle" (1025–1075) and "late" (1075–1200), Jochen Giesler greatly contributed to its stratigraphy, chronology and typology, dividing it into three phases (Hungarian, and Bijelo Brdo I and II). Later research concluded that the initial phase began in the 9th century, and end of the late phase could have been in the middle-13th or early 14th century. Željko Tomičić considered "Proto-Bijelo Brdo" phase before the 10th century, a "transitional" phase (900–965), proper "I" with early and late phase (965–1030), "II" also with early and late phase (1030–1100), and "III" (1100–1250/1300).

In the Lower Pannonia some examples include largest site in Croatia in Vukovar-Lijeva Bara from the 10-11th century (with over 400 graves), bracelet from Vinkovci from the end of the 10th-early 11th century, findings in Podravina and Northern Croatia from the 11th century.

In the "late" phase the decline of pagan customs should be associated with the rise of Christianity and Hungarian-Slavic assimilation. Some scholars consider that the culture's cemeteries disappeared, at least in Transylvania, around 1100, most probably not independently of laws adopted under Kings Ladislaus I and Coloman of Hungary which prescribed the burial of dead in graveyards developed near churches.

== Characteristics ==
The culture's burial grounds don't have kurgans, but feature inhumation, and consist of a dozen to a hundred graves. The burials almost completely lack military equipment. Rarely and only in the initial phase were found horse burials. Female dress accessories, including "jewellery of plaited wire, two-piece sheetwork pendants, snake-head bracelets and S-shaped temple-reings", are the most characteristic items of the culture. The S-shaped temple rings were previously characteristic feature of the Sclaveni of Prague-Korchak culture. South of the Sava river, "assemblages attributed to the 'Bjelo Brdo culture' are easily recognizable by specific female dress accessories, especially 'beaded' earrings with grape-like pendants evidently imitating granulated ornaments of ninth-century specimens". The analogies were also found on the Eastern Adriatic coast. In the Lower Pannonia, around 1000 CE also appear the so-called "Volyn-Kiev"-type earrings, and "cast crescent-shaped earrings made of perforated type variants, also with luxury filigree models".

== Ethnic identification ==
It is considered that the "rarity of weapons and the conspicuous marking of female burials with multiple sets of dress accessories suggest that this was a population very different from that which buried its deceased in horseman burials". However, the "exact identity of the population using the cemeteries of the 'Bjelo Brdo culture' has been the subject of much debate". Since the beginning of the scholarly research was thought that the Bijelo Brdo, and other poorer gravesites in early medieval Hungary, were Slavic and that only the rich horse-warrior burials were of Hungarian conquerors. This view started to be challenged in the 1940s and 1950s, by archaeologists Zdeněk Váňa and Béla Szőke and Hungarian scholars, who see the poorer burials as Hungarian commoners, and not as Slavs. However, other scholars consider that such conclusion is not well substantiated because of which is not generally accepted. V. V. Sedov considers that the culture is natural continuation of the pre-Hungarian early Slavic culture in the Carpathian Basin, but cannot be refuted later existence of Hungarian commoners who abandoned nomadic lifestyle. Recently, Željko Tomičić also came to the conclusion that the culture's proto-types predate the arrival of the Hungarians.

== See also ==
- Slavic migrations to the Balkans
- Slavs in Lower Pannonia#Archaeology
- Duchy of Croatia#Archaeology

== Footnotes ==
=== References ===
- Barford, P. M. (2001). The Early Slavs: Culture and Society in Early Medieval Eastern Europe. Cornell University Press. ISBN 0-8014-3977-9.
- Bedić, Željko (2021). "Evidence of interpersonal violence at two sites of the Bijelo Brdo culture in eastern Croatia". Vjesnik Arheološkog muzeja u Zagrebu (in Croatian and English). 54 (1): 387–389. doi:10.52064/vamz.54.1.21.
- Bilogrivić, Goran (2019). "Medieval Reality or a Modern Construct? Old Croatian Culture in Medieval Studies Between the 19th and the 21st Century". Südost-Forschungen. 78 (1): 191–225. doi:10.1515/sofo-2019-780111.
- Curta, Florin (2006). Southeastern Europe in the Middle Ages, 500-1250. Cambridge University Press. ISBN 978-0-521-89452-4.
- Demo, Željko (2005). "Refleksni luk s ranosrednjovjekovnog groblja Vukovar-Lijeva Bara (Gr. 92)" [The composite bow from the early medieval cemetery of Vukovar-Lijeva Bara (grave 92)]. Starohrvatska prosvjeta (in Croatian and English). III (32): 77–89.
- Demo, Željko (2007). "Ranosrednjovjekovni predmeti od kosti i roga u arheološkome muzeju u Zagrebu" [Early Medieval Objects of Bone and Horn in the Archaeological Museum in Zagreb]. Starohrvatska prosvjeta (in Croatian and English). III (34): 123–149.
- Engel, Pál (2001). The Realm of St Stephen: A History of Medieval Hungary, 895-1526. I.B. Tauris Publishers. ISBN 1-86064-061-3.
- Jarak, Mirja (2021). "Željko Tomičić, Bjelobrdski kulturni krug. Groblja 9. do 13. stoljeća u međurječju Mure, Drave, Dunava i Save, Zagreb–Požega, 2019. (Book Review)". Arheološki radovi i rasprave (in Croatian). 20 (1): 355–362.
- Jeršek, Petra (2022). "A contribution to research on grave finds of the 10th and 11th centuries in Međimurje". Vjesnik Arheološkog muzeja u Zagrebu (in Croatian and English). 55 (2): 257–299. doi:10.52064/vamz.55.2.5.
- Langó, Péter (2005). "Archaeological research on the conquering Hungarians: A review". In Balázs G. Mende (ed.). Research on the prehistory of the Hungarians: a review : papers presented at the meetings of the Institute of Archaeology of the HAS, 2003-2004 (Varia Archaeologica Hungarica 18 ed.). Budapest: Hungarian Academy of Sciences. ISBN 963-7391-87-8.
- Papeša, Anita Rapan (2014). "Dvije ranosrednjovjekovne narukvice kao prilog poznavanju kontinuiteta života u Vinkovcima" [Two early-mediaeval bracelets as a contribution to knowledge of the continuity of life in Vinkovci]. Vjesnik Arheološkog muzeja u Zagrebu (in Croatian and English). 47 (1): 285–296.
- Petrinec, Maja (2009). Groblja od 8. do 11. stoljeća na području ranosrednjovjekovne hrvatske države (in Croatian). Split: Muzej hrvatskih arheoloških spomenika. ISBN 9789536803224.
- Radišić, Milica (2021). "A gilded attire set from the Museum of Srem – a contribution to the study of the Hungarian conquest period in the southernmost area of the Carpatian basin". Vjesnik Arheološkog muzeja u Zagrebu (in Croatian and English). 54 (1): 301–314. doi:10.52064/vamz.54.1.17.
- Radišić, Milica (2023). "On how justified the term Bijelo Brdo culture is in medieval archaeology". 6th International Scientific Symposium in honour of Stjepan Gunjača. Political and Social Structures in Early Medieval Central, South and Eastern Europe (9th – 15th centuries): Archaeological and historical evidence, 8 - 11 November 2023. Split: Museum of Croatian Archaeological Monuments. pp. 30–31. ISBN 978-953-6803-86-6.
- Spinei, Victor (2003). The Great Migrations in the East and South East of Europe from the Ninth to the Thirteenth Century. Translated by Dana Bădulescu. ISBN 973-85894-5-2.
- Sedov, Valentin Vasilyevich (2013) [1995]. Славяне в раннем Средневековье [Sloveni u ranom srednjem veku (Slavs in Early Middle Ages)]. Novi Sad: Akademska knjiga. ISBN 978-86-6263-026-1.
- Sokol, Vladimir (1999). "The archaeological heritage of early Croats". In Ivan Supičić (ed.). Croatia in the Early Middle Ages: A Cultural Survey. London, Zagreb: Philip Wilson Publishers, AGM. pp. 117–145. ISBN 0856674990.
- Šmalcelj, Pia (2012). "Kulturni elementi na grobljima sjeverozapadne Bosne" [Cultural Elements on Cemeteries in north-western Bosnia]. Starohrvatska prosvjeta (in Croatian and English). III (39): 131–170.
- Tomičić, Željko (1990). "Tragom novijih istraživanja bjelobrdske kulture u slavonskom dijelu Podravine" [Recent Investigations of the Bijelo Brdo Culture in Slavonian Podravina (Drava Valley)]. Prilozi Instituta za arheologiju u Zagrebu (in Croatian and English). 7: 85–105.
- Tomičić, Željko (1991). "Na tragu bjelobrdske kulture u Kalničkom prigorju" [Bijelo Brdo culture in the Kalnik hills]. Starohrvatska prosvjeta (in Croatian and English). III (21): 99–122.
- Tomičić, Željko (1997). "Baranja u svjetlu arheoloških svjedočanstava bjelobrdske kulture. Prinos analizi ranosrednjovjekovnog groblja Majs-Udvar". Osijeker Sammelband (in Croatian). 23–23: 71–95.
- Tomičić, Željko (2007). "Prinos poznavanju kronologije ranosrednjovjekovnoga groblja Gomjenica kraj Prijedora" [Tribute to Investigation of the Chronology of the Early mediaeval Graveyard Gomjenica near Prijedor]. Starohrvatska prosvjeta (in Croatian and German). III (34): 151–197.
- Vodanović, Marin; Brkić, Hrvoje; Demo, Željko (February 2005). "Paleostomatološka analiza humanog kraniofacijalnog osteološkog materijala sa srednjovjekovnog nalazišta Bijelo..." [Paleostomatological analysis of human cranial osteological material from the mediaeval site of Bijelo Brdo near Osijek]. Journal of the Zagreb Archaeological Museum. 37 (1). Archaeological Museum, Zagreb. ISSN 0350-7165.
