= Church of the Transfer of the Relics of the Holy Father Nicholas, Bijelo Brdo =

Church of the Transfer of the Relics of the Holy Father Nicholas
- Црква преноса моштију светог оца Николаја
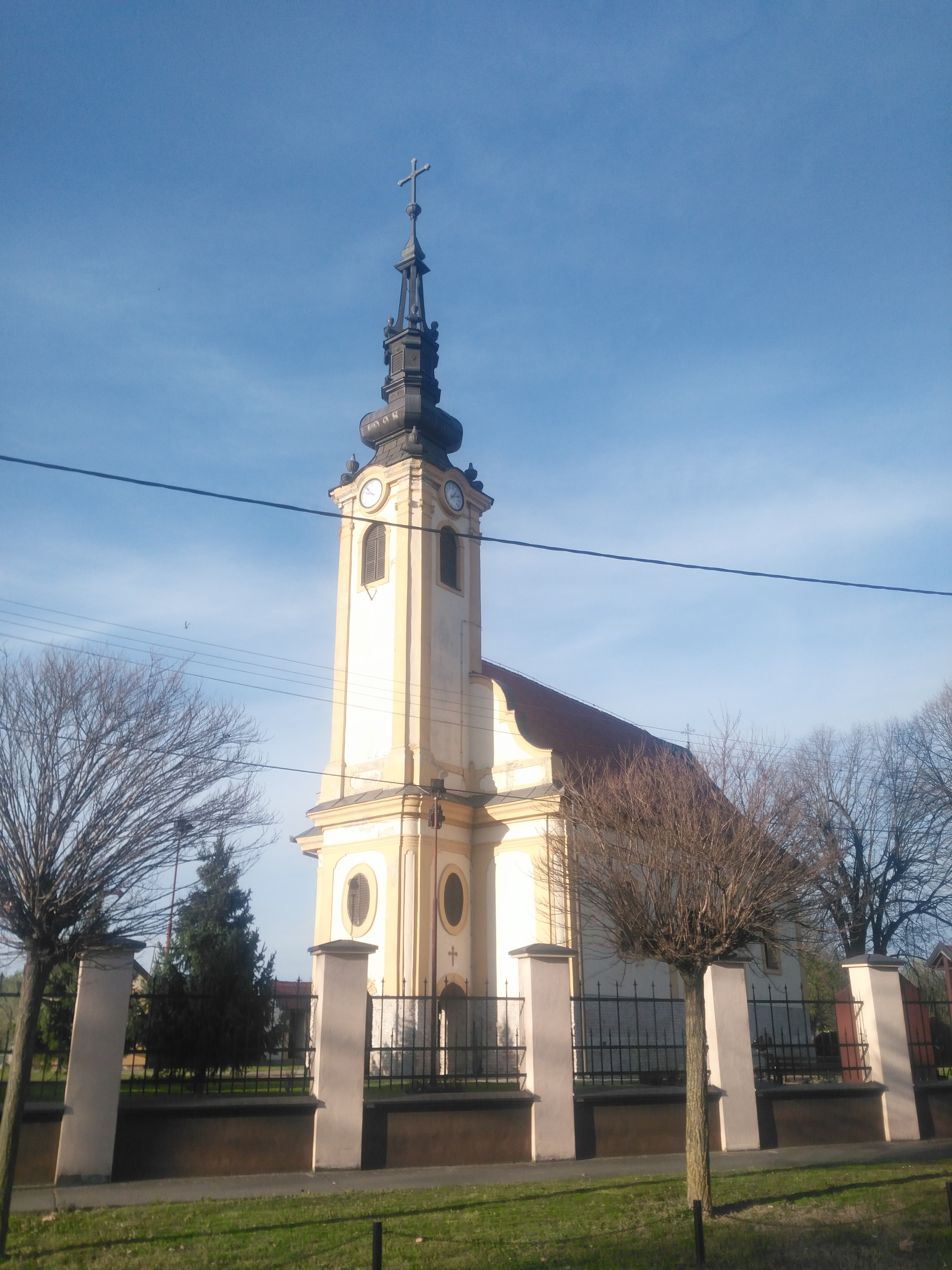
- Church of the Transfer of the Relics of the Holy Father Nicholas
- 45°31′13″N 18°52′27″E
- Location: Bijelo Brdo, Osijek-Baranja County
- Country: Croatia
- Denomination: Serbian Orthodox

History
- Status: Church
- Dedication: St Nicholas

Architecture
- Functional status: Active
- Style: Baroque

Administration
- Archdiocese: Eparchy of Osječko polje and Baranja

Church of the Transfer of the Relics of the Holy Father Nicholas (Serbian Cyrillic: Црква преноса моштију светог оца Николаја) is a Serbian Orthodox church in Bijelo Brdo, eastern Croatia. The building of the church was initiated on 27 July 1764 with major works lasting for the following three years.

Constructor of the iconostasis is unknown but it is known that the icons on it were painted by Jovan Isailović in 1783 while his grandson Jovan Isailović Jr. completed wall paintings between 1850 and 1854. In 1941, during the Genocide of Serbs in the Independent State of Croatia, the Ustasha regime destroyed the iconostasis destroying a part of the icons, while remaining were taken to the Franciscan monastery in Osijek. The church was converted into a Roman Catholic one followed by forcible conversion of local population.

== See also ==
- Eparchy of Osječko polje and Baranja
- Serbs of Croatia
- List of Serbian Orthodox churches in Croatia
