= Bijelo Brdo, Croatia =

Bijelo Brdo Бијело Брдо (Serbian)
- Village (Selo)
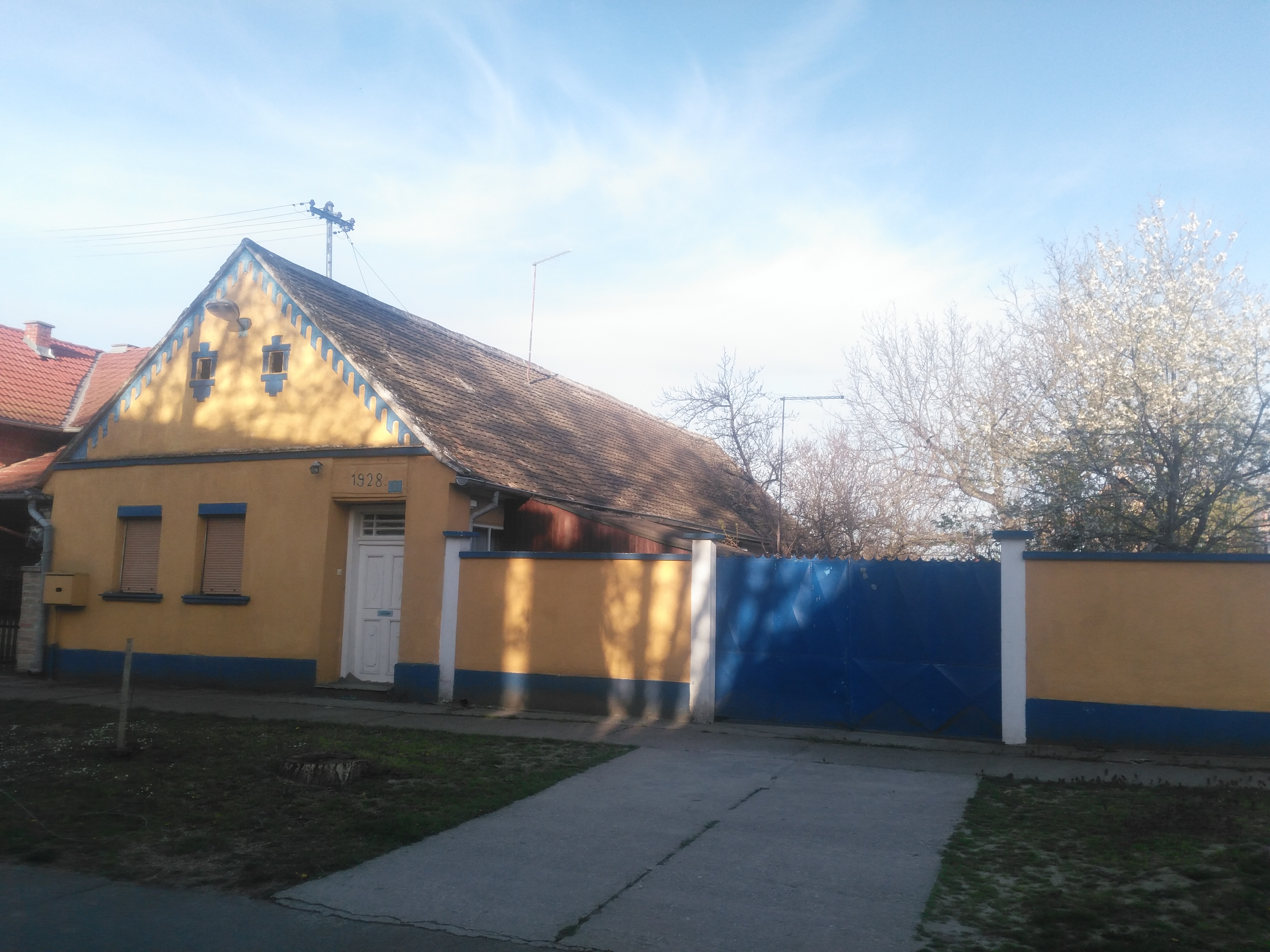
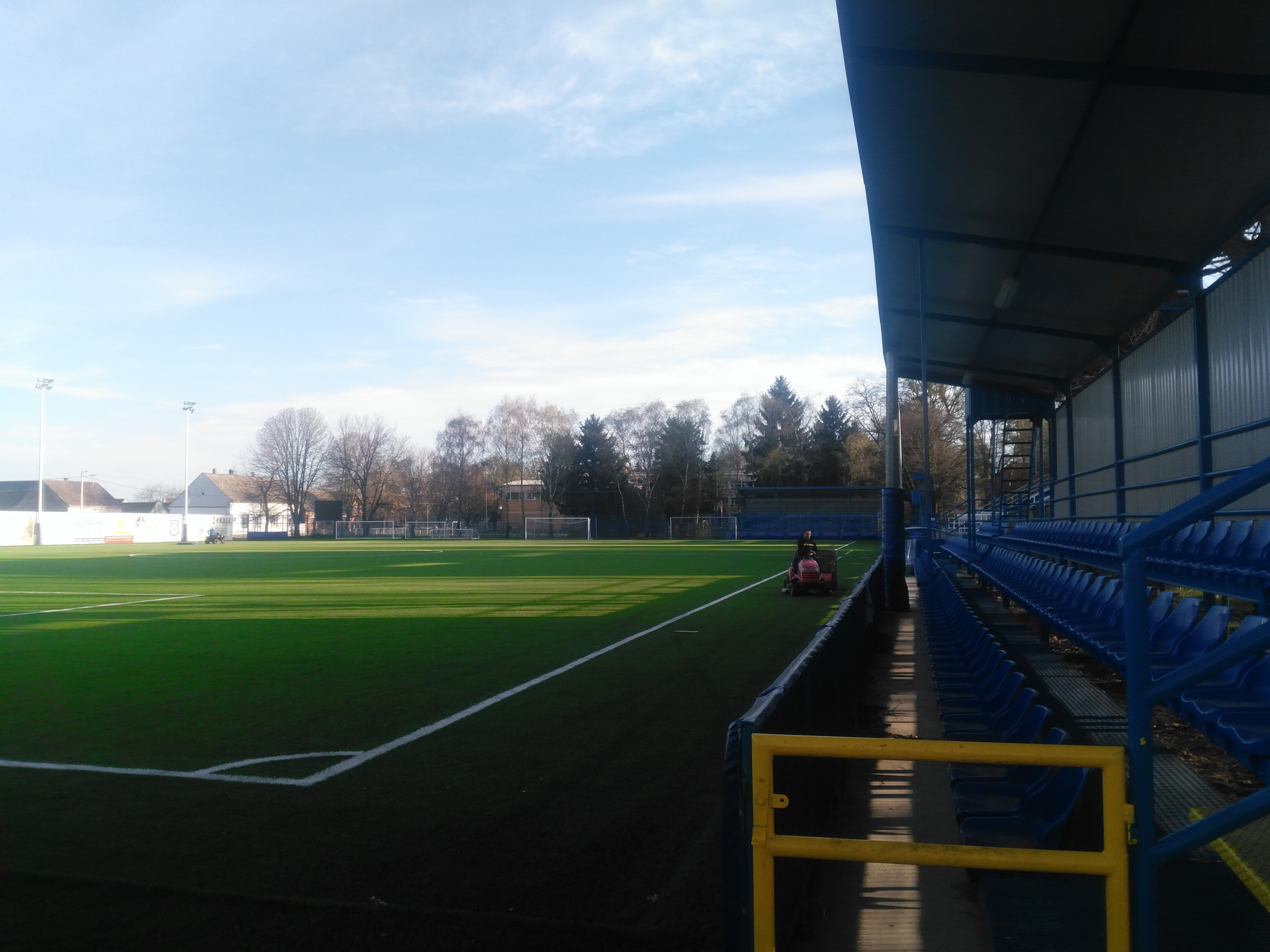
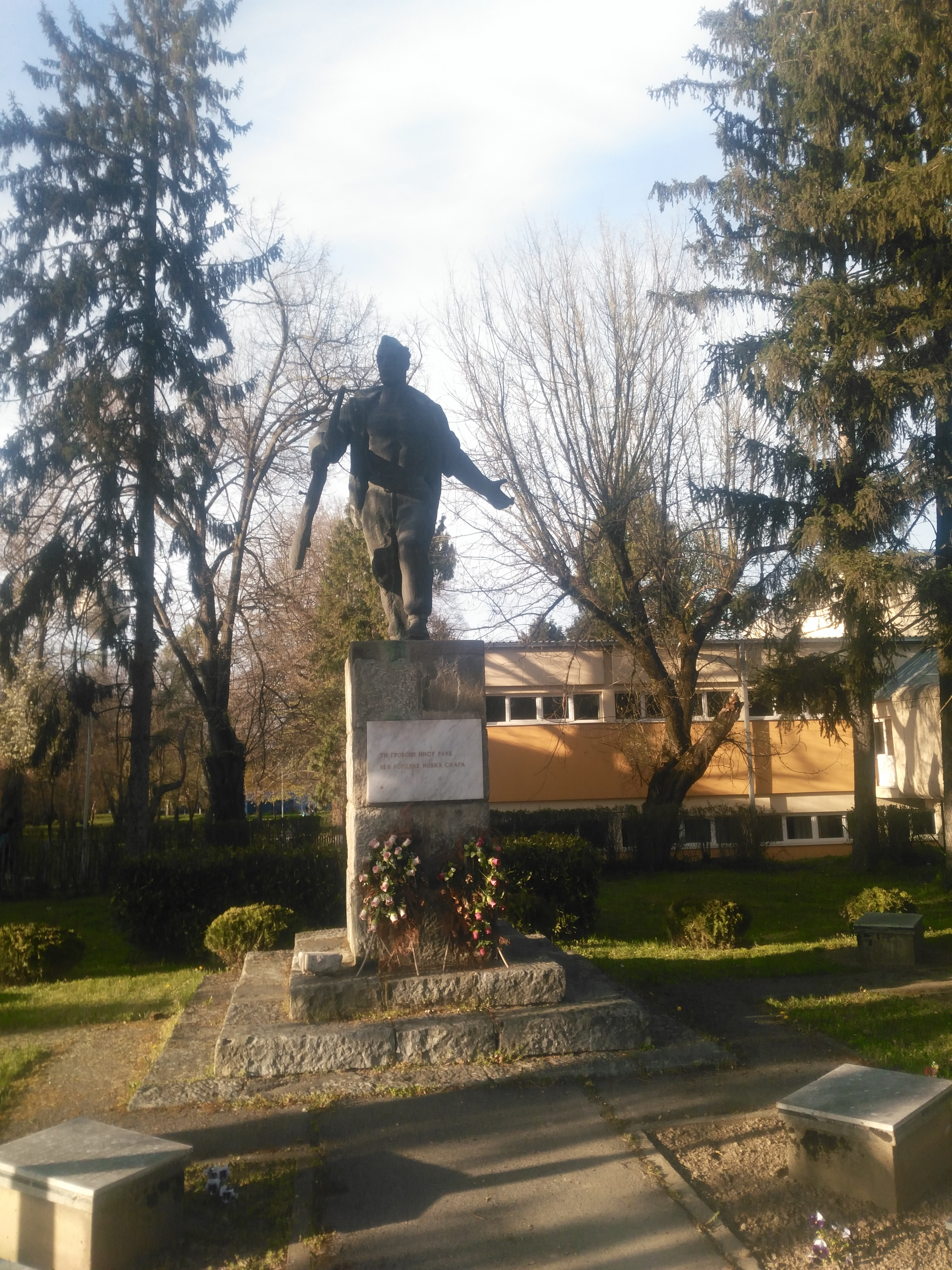
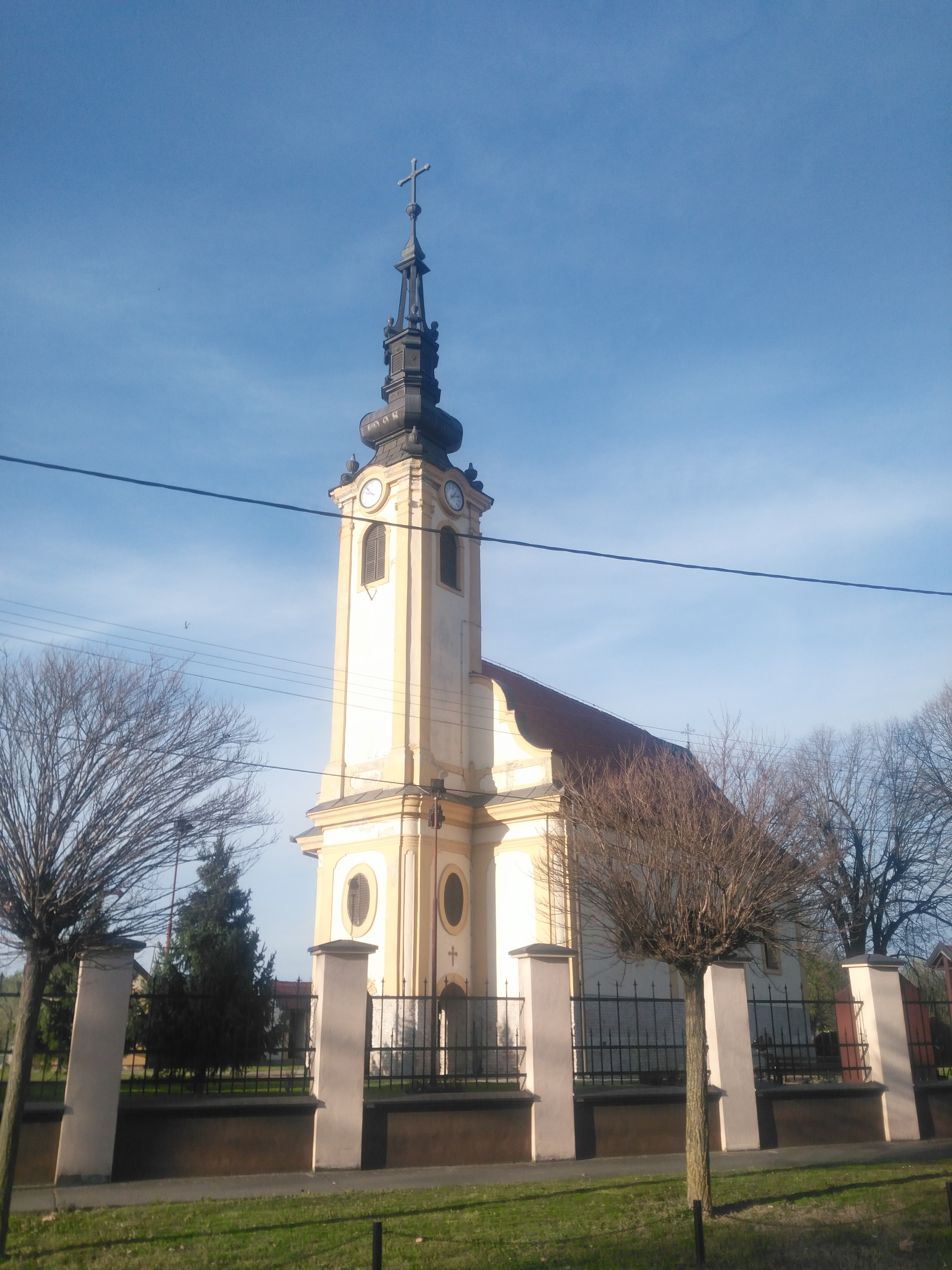
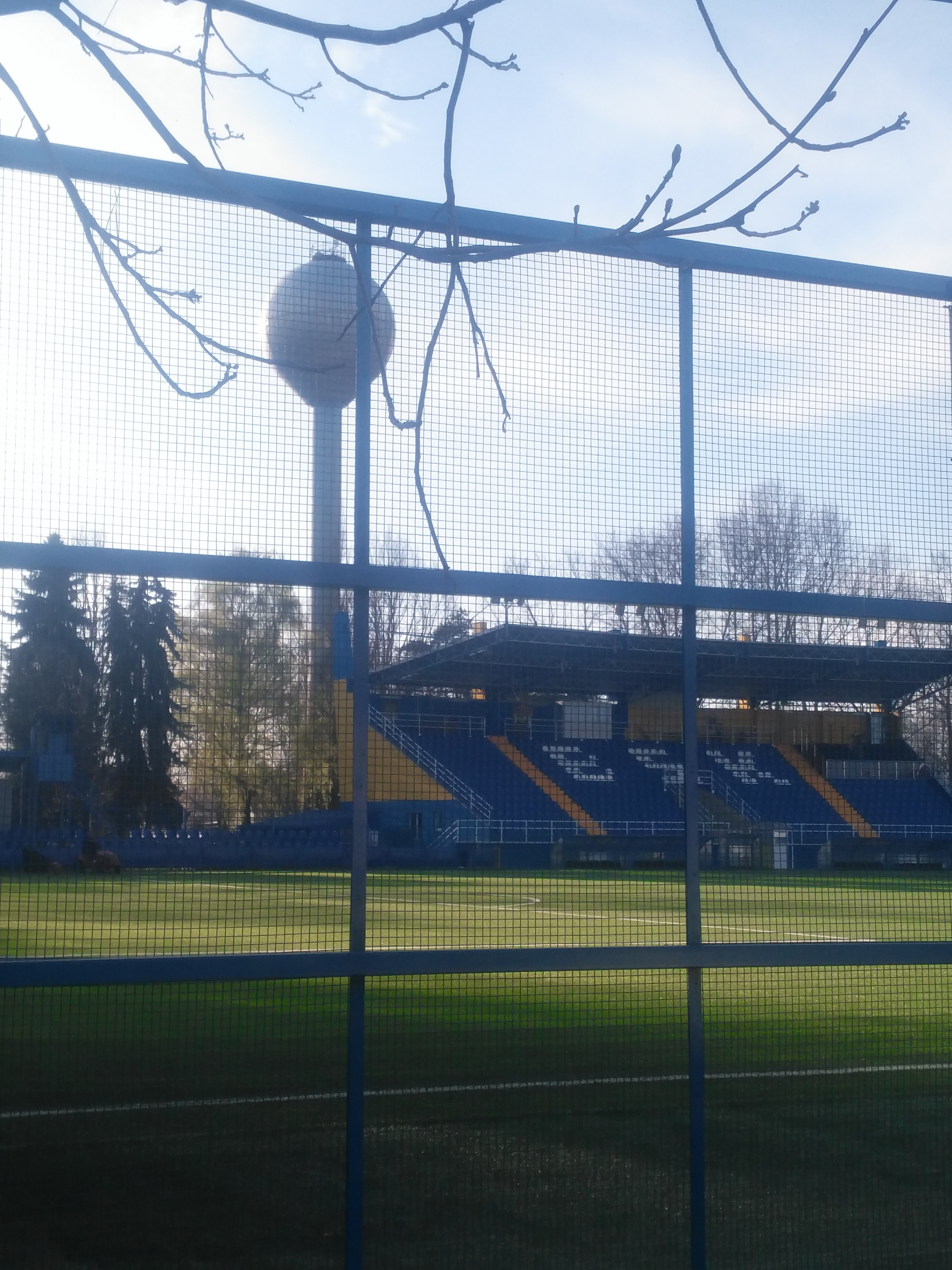
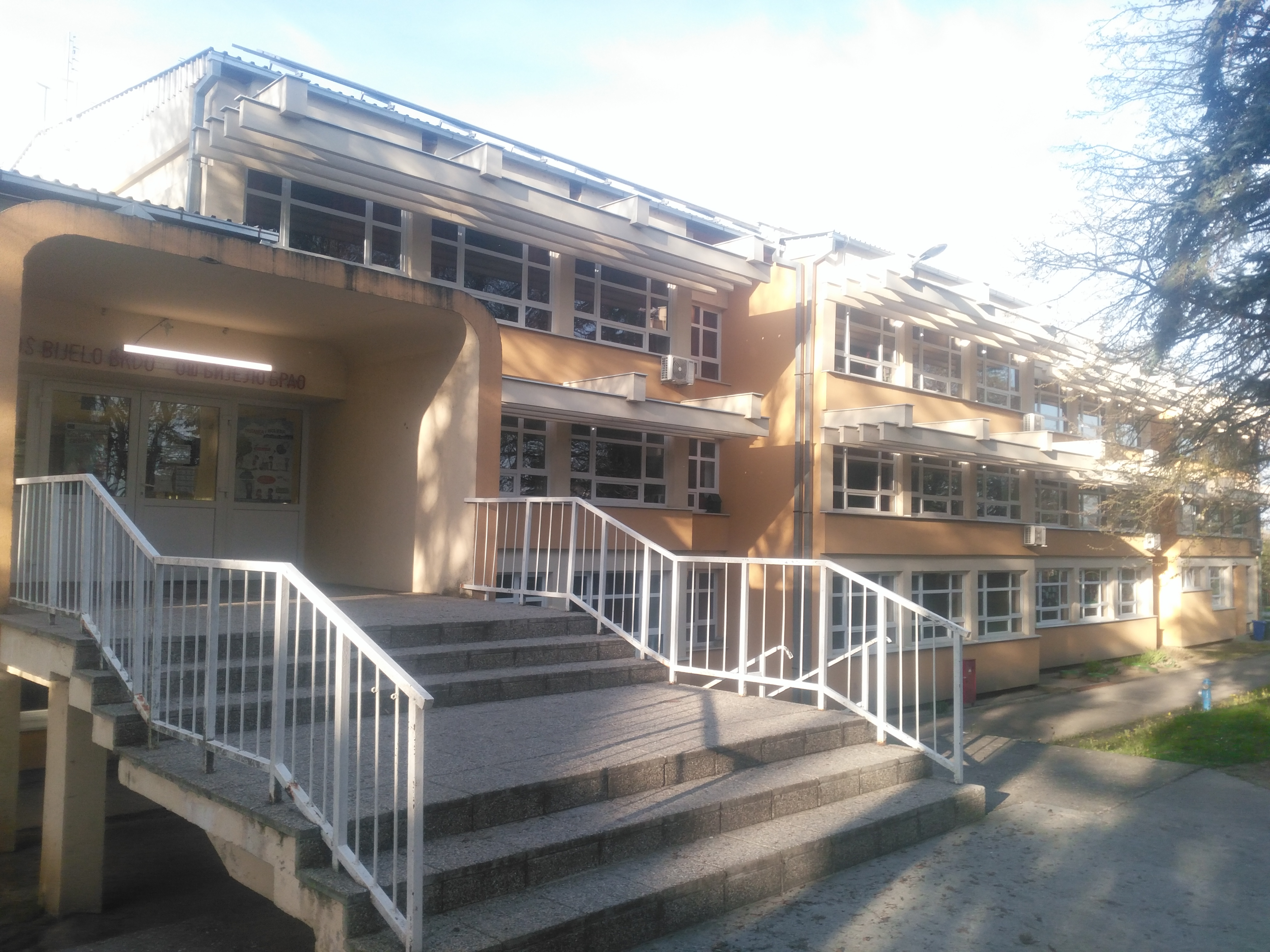
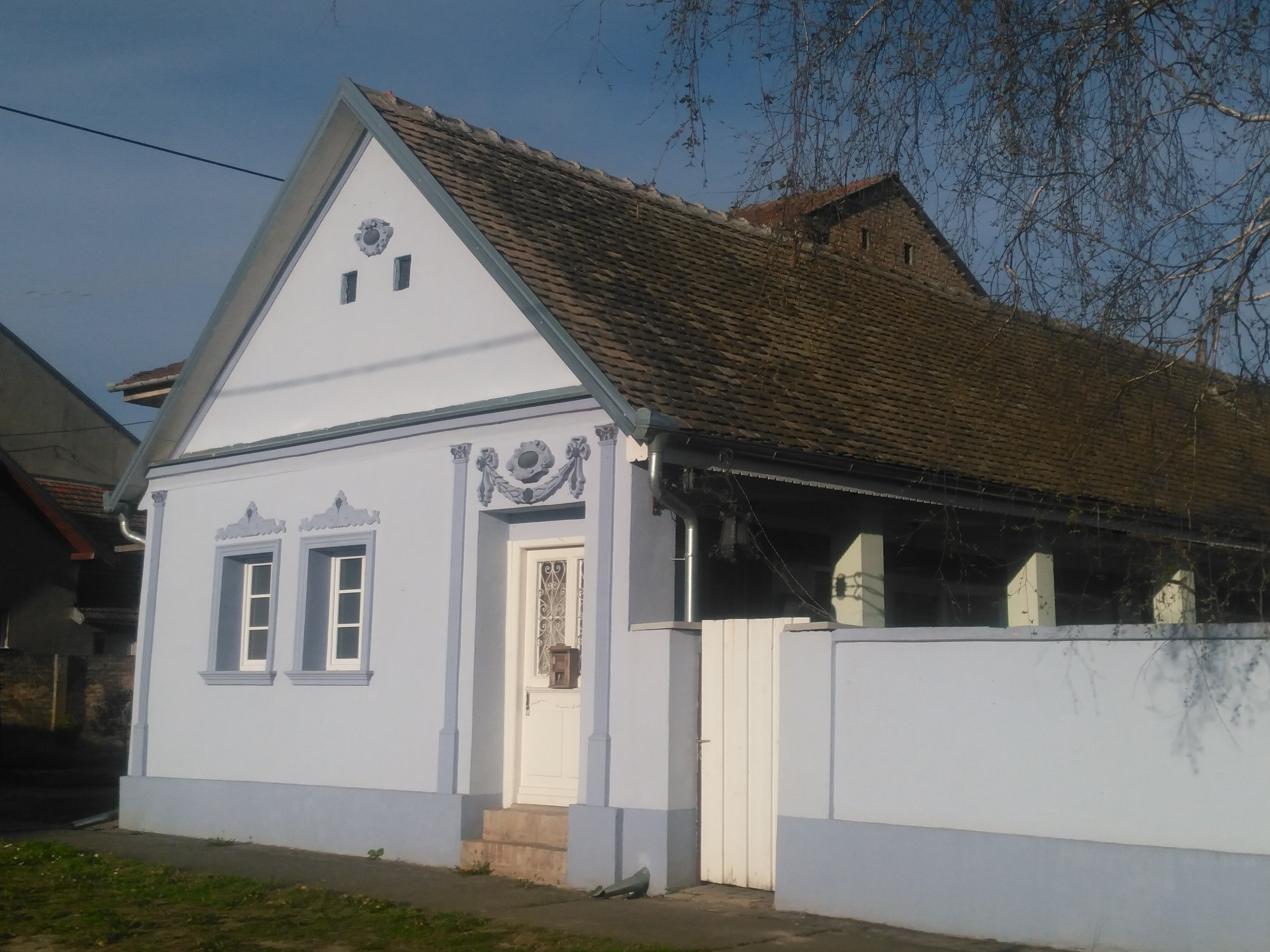

- Location within Osijek-Baranja County Location within Croatia Location within Europe
- Coordinates: 45.5172°N 18.8708°E
- Country: Croatia
- County: Osijek-Baranja
- Municipality: Erdut

Government
  - Body: Local Committee

Area
  - Total: 14.7 sq mi (38.1 km^{2})

Population (2021)
  - Total: 1,517
  - Density: 103/sq mi (39.8/km^{2})
- Demonym(s): Bjelobrđanin (♂) Bjelobrđanka (♀) (per grammatical gender)
- Time zone: UTC+1 (CET)
  - Summer (DST): UTC+2 (CEST)
- Official languages: Croatian, Serbian

Bijelo Brdo (Serbian Cyrillic: Бијело Брдо, Hungarian: Darnó, German: Wellibardo) is a village in the Erdut municipality in eastern Croatia. It is connected by the D213 road and by R202 railway. It has a total of 1,961 inhabitants (2011).

== Geography ==
The village is situated 15 km east from Osijek, in the Slavonia region on the banks of the Stara Drava branch, in the micro-region of Erdutska kosa, at an altitude of 93m above sea level. It covers an area of 36.64 km^{2}.

== History ==
Bijelo Brdo is important for archeological findings from the Bronze Age (Transdanubian cultural group) and two medieval cemeteries: one Avar-Slavic from VII-IX. century and another from X-XI. century, which became the eponymous site of the Bijelo Brdo culture. Before the Ottoman rule, the village was once called Trnovac, the neighboring Hungarians called it Dorno. During the Ottoman rule, the population from upper Podrinje and Polimlje settled here. During the Vienna War (1683–1699), at the time of the Turkish withdrawal the settlement was destroyed and the inhabitants fled to Bosnia. A considerable number of Serbs, in the almost desolate Trnovac, settled at the time of the Great Migrations of the Serbs under Arsenije III Čarnojević. At that time, the Lordship of Dalj was established, and the village became part of its domain.

In 1706, the village numbered 63 houses and in that year became part of a Dalj estate. The colonization of Slavonia was carried out in a systematic fashion through centuries but particularly during the period of WWII. Among people inhabiting poor areas, Slavonia was famed as a promised land which could feed large numbers of people, where there was a lot of fertile land and favorable living conditions.

== Culture ==
- Church of the Transfer of the relics of the Holy Father Nicholas, Bijelo Brdo, built between 1764 and 1809, reconstructed in 1996.

== Demographics ==
The 2011 census recorded a total of 1,961 inhabitants. The 2001 census had a total of 2,119 inhabitants in 720 households. The 1991 census recorded a total of 2,400 inhabitants, out of which 1,941 (80.87%) were ethnic Serbs, 217 (9.04%) Croats, 97 (4.04%) Yugoslavs, and remainder all other ethnicities combined.

== Sports ==
- NK BSK Bijelo Brdo
- Bijelo Brdo Chess Club

== Notable people ==
- Kuzman Stanić (1825–1898), parish priest of Timişoara
- Vasilije Trbić (1881–1962), Serbian Chetnik commander in Macedonia
