= Lordship of Dalj =

The Lordship of Dalj (German: Herrschaft Dallia, Serbo-Croatian: Daljsko vlastelinstvo, Даљско властелинство) was a large land estate, lordship, owned by the Metropolitanate of Karlovci, established in the Kingdom of Slavonia after the Treaty of Karlowitz. Alongside village of Dalj, lordship included villages of Bijelo Brdo, Cerić and Borovo with lists often including far away Metropolitan property of Neradin.

== History ==
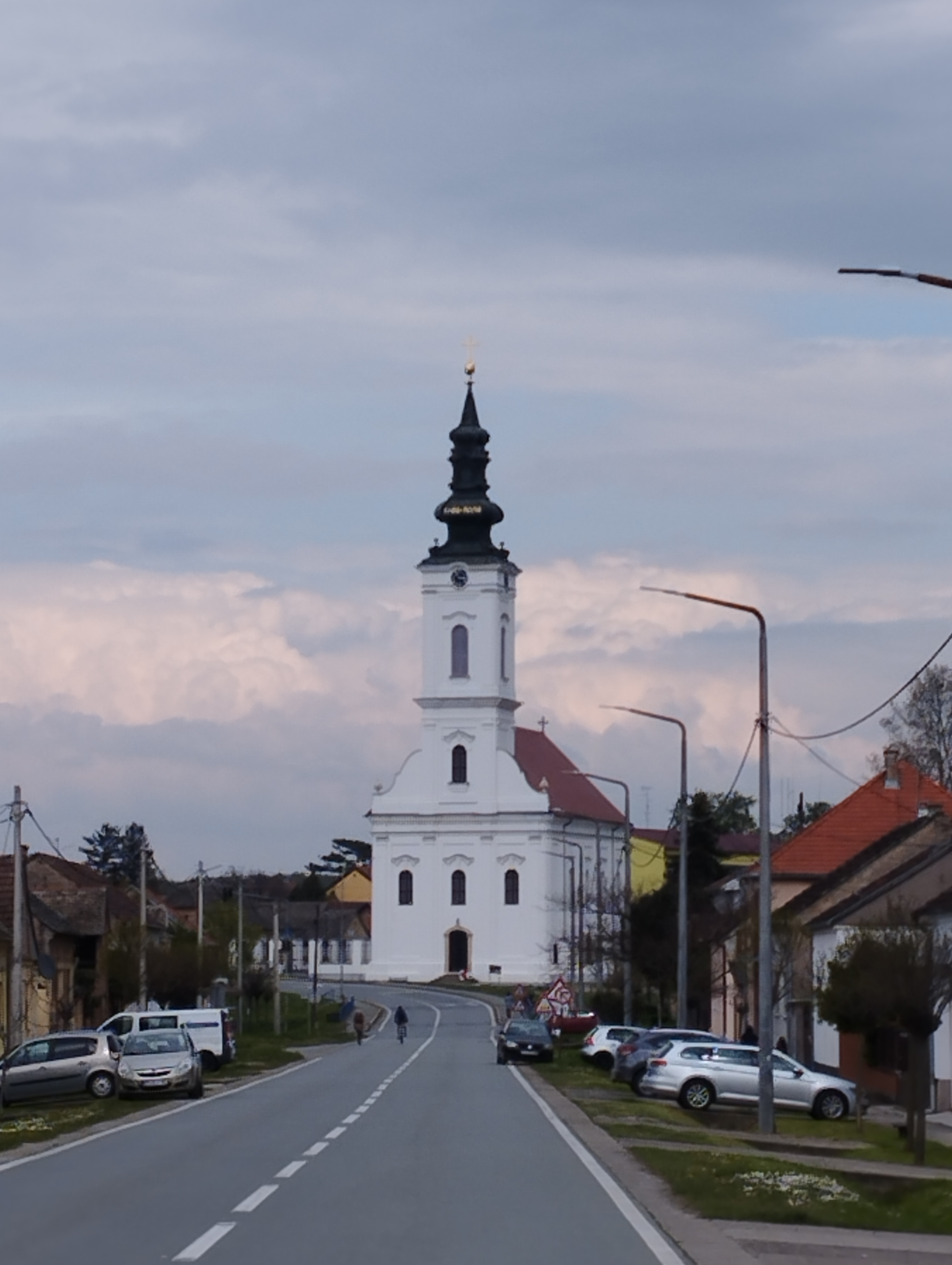
Saint Demetrius Cathedral, episcopal see of the Eparchy of Osijek Plain and Baranya

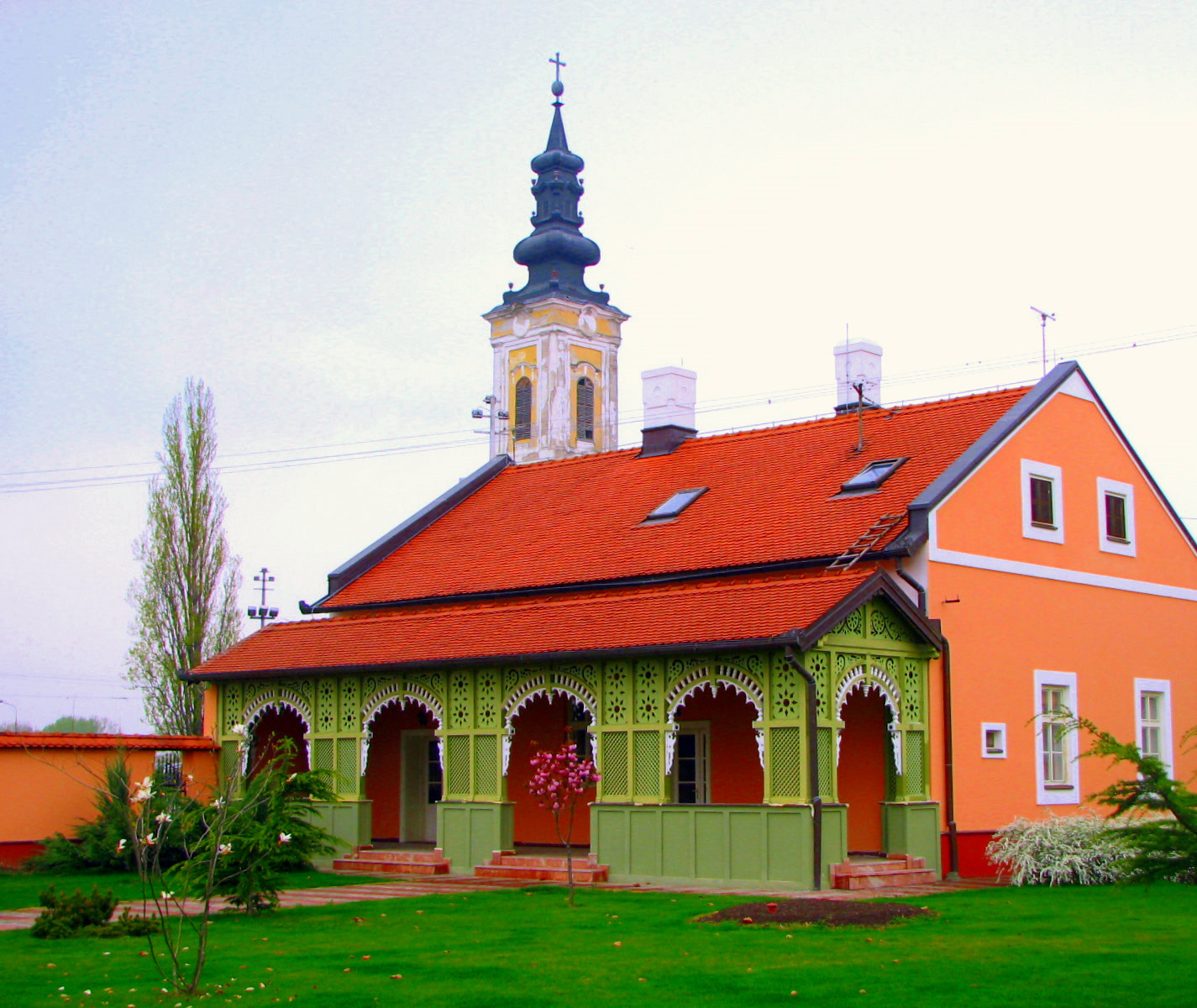
Patriarchal Palace in Dalj, seat of the Eparchy of Osijek Plain and Baranya and bishop's residence

The village of Dalj and surrounding area became a part of Habsburg monarchy on 10 November 1687 during the Great Turkish War. During that time, Serbian Patriarchate of Peć seated at the Patriarchate of Peć Monastery in Kosovo sided with the Austrians and Habsburg forces occupied Serbia for a couple of years. When Habsburgs retreated from the Balkans, Great Migrations of the Serbs to Kingdom of Hungary occurred under the leadership of Serbian Patriarch Arsenije III Crnojević.

In 1695, Arsenije III Crnojević requested Hofkammer in Vienna to address immediate material needs of his exiled Eastern Orthodox church hierarchy in new lands.

Lordship of Dalj was established on 15 July 1706, when Emperor Joseph I granted the area along the Danube to the Serbian Patriarch Arsenije III Crnojević. The estate was not given as permanent hereditary property, but rather conditionally, as part of a broader arrangement to compensate the patriarch for a substantial state debt. The creation of the Dalj estate followed earlier unsuccessful attempts to provide the patriarch with suitable landed compensation. Previous grants, such as the estates of Sirač and Sečuj, had either not been effectively transferred or were lost due to competing noble claims.

Although the estate was formally transferred to Arsenije III in September 1706, he died shortly thereafter. During periods when the metropolitan seat was vacant, the estate came under the administration of the Hofkammer, a practice that continued throughout its history. In 1708 the new metropolitan received royal grant for the lordship and in 1711 it was granted again to Sofronije Podgoričanin. Subsequent metropolitans received confirmation of their rights to the estate upon their appointment, though there were occasional interruptions and disputes with state authorities. When in 1726 unification of Metropolitanate of Karlovci and Metropolitanate of Belgrade was declared, Hofkammer took away the lordship from the new body and returned it only on 29 February 1729 under annual fee of 1300 forints.

== See also ==
- Eparchy of Osijek Plain and Baranya
- Lordship of Vukovar
- Lordship of Ilok and Upper Syrmia
- Lordship of Nuštar
