= Borovo Naselje =

- City district of Vukovar
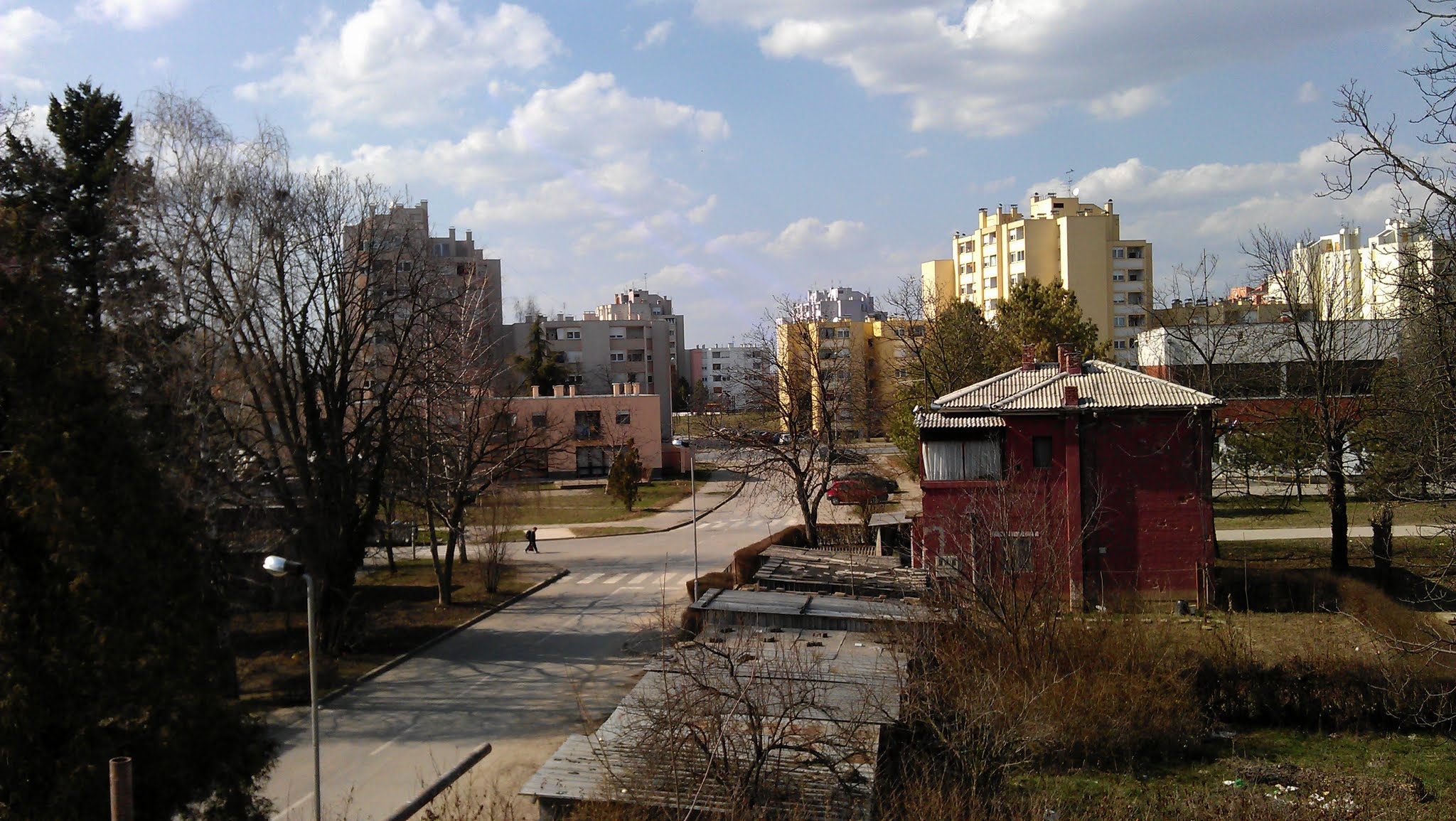
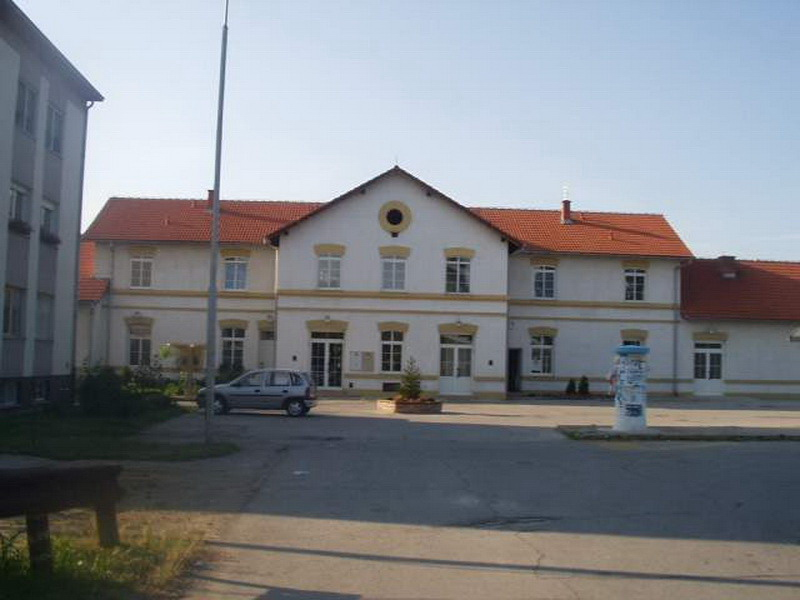
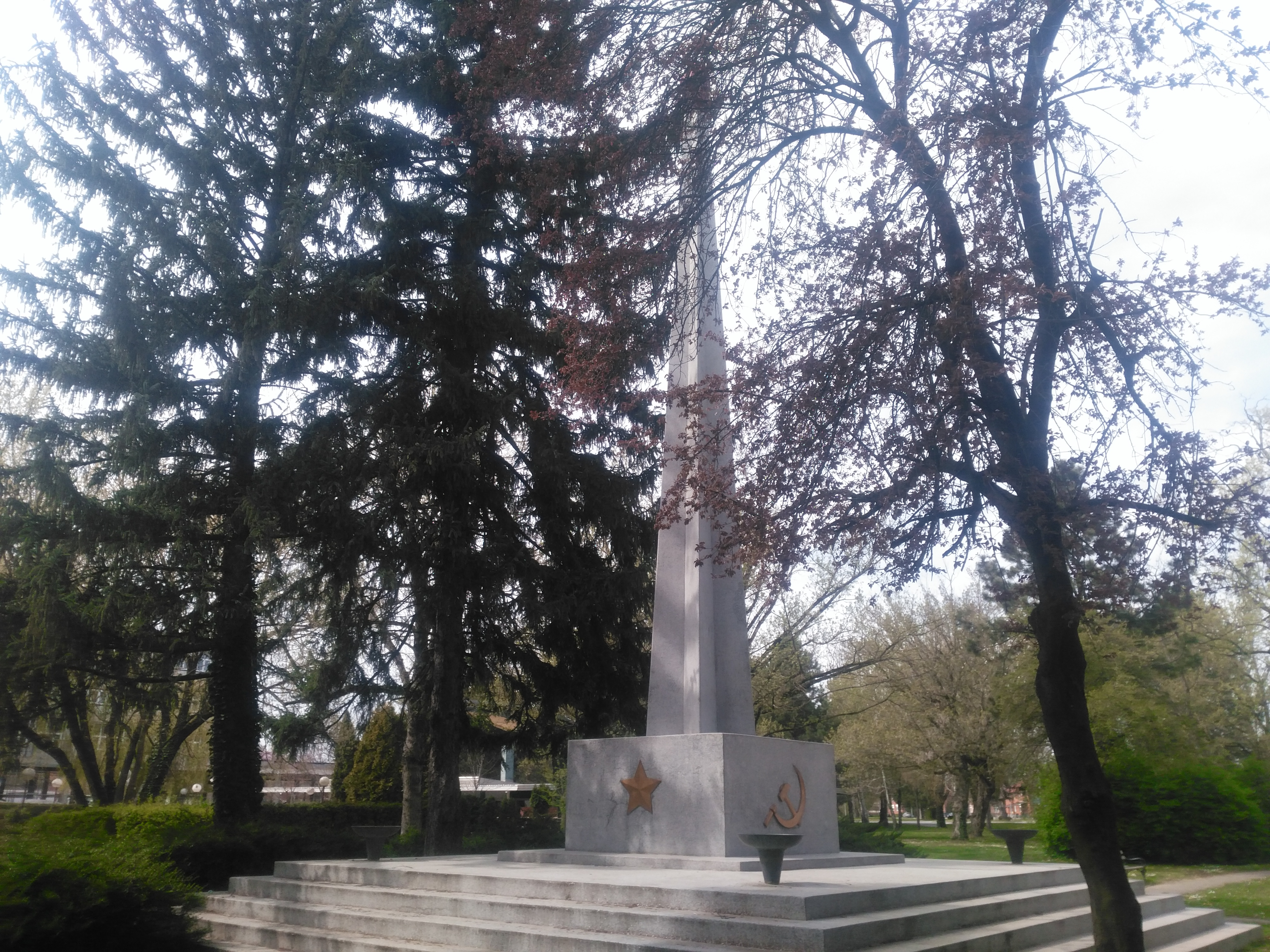
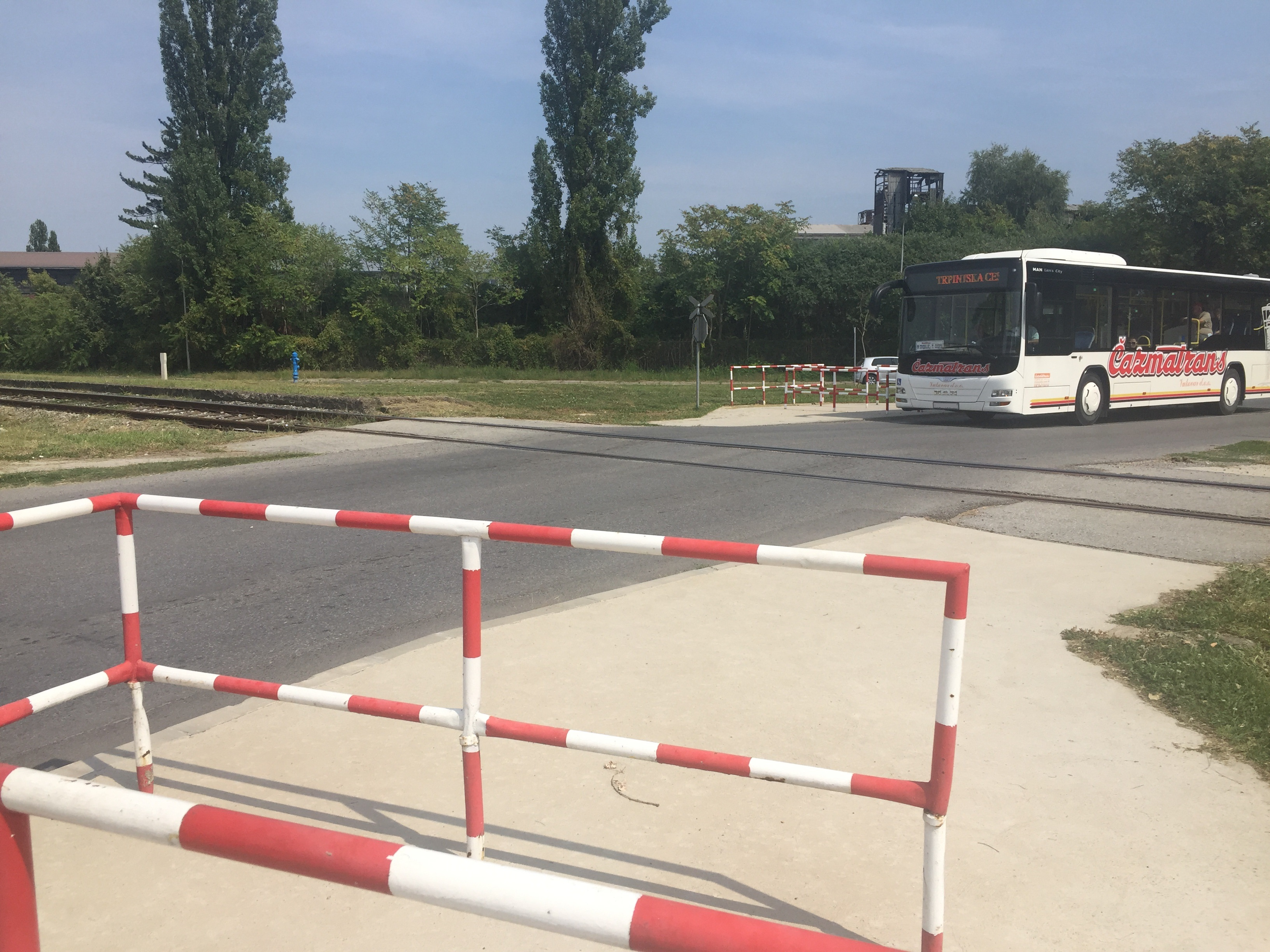
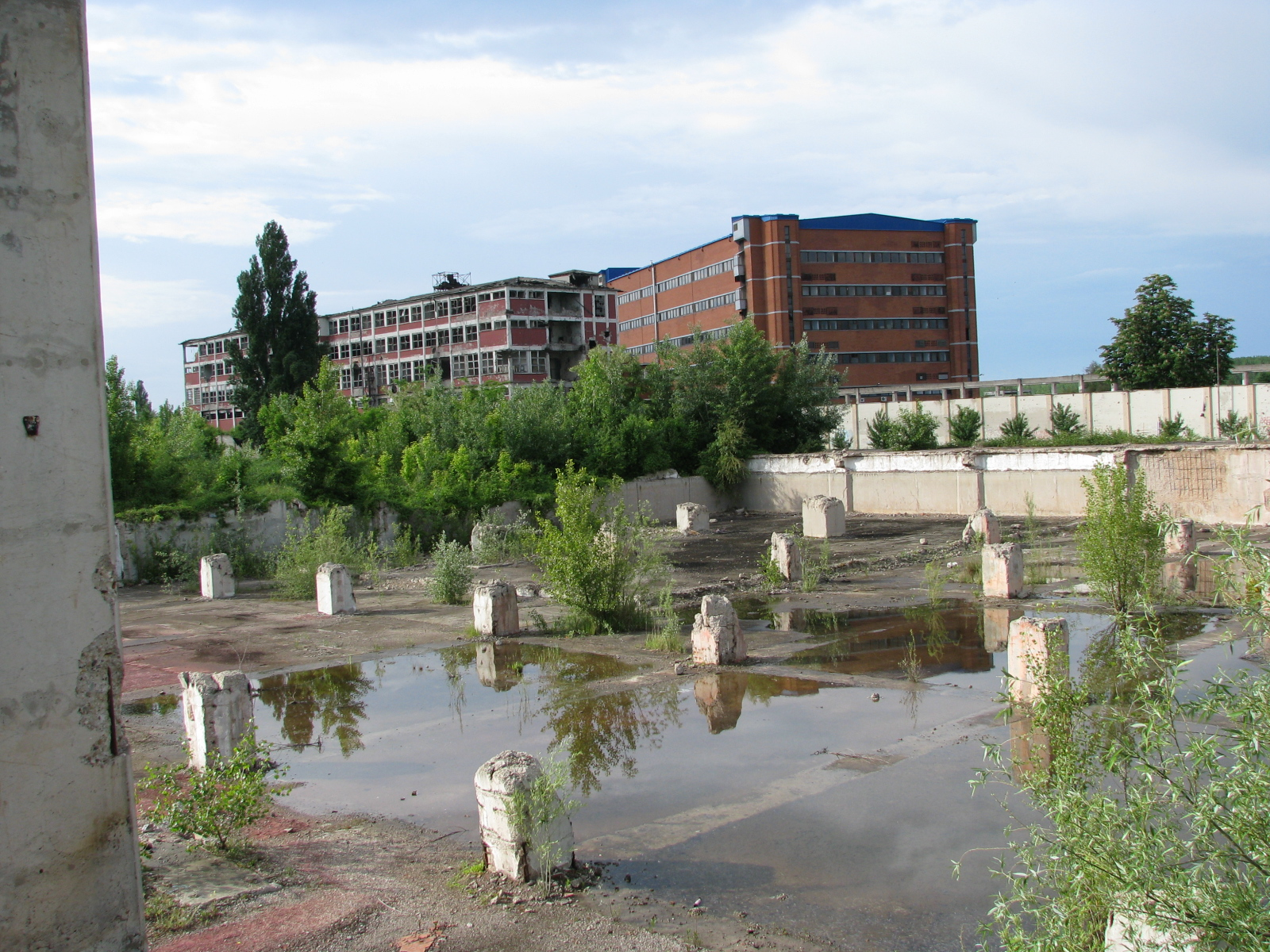
- Borovo Naselje panoramic view
- Interactive map of Borovo Naselje
- Coordinates: 45°23′N 18°57′E
- Country: Croatia
- Region: Podunavlje
- County: Vukovar-Syrmia
- City: Vukovar
- Time zone: UTC+1
  - Summer (DST): UTC+2 (CEST)
- Vehicle registration: VU

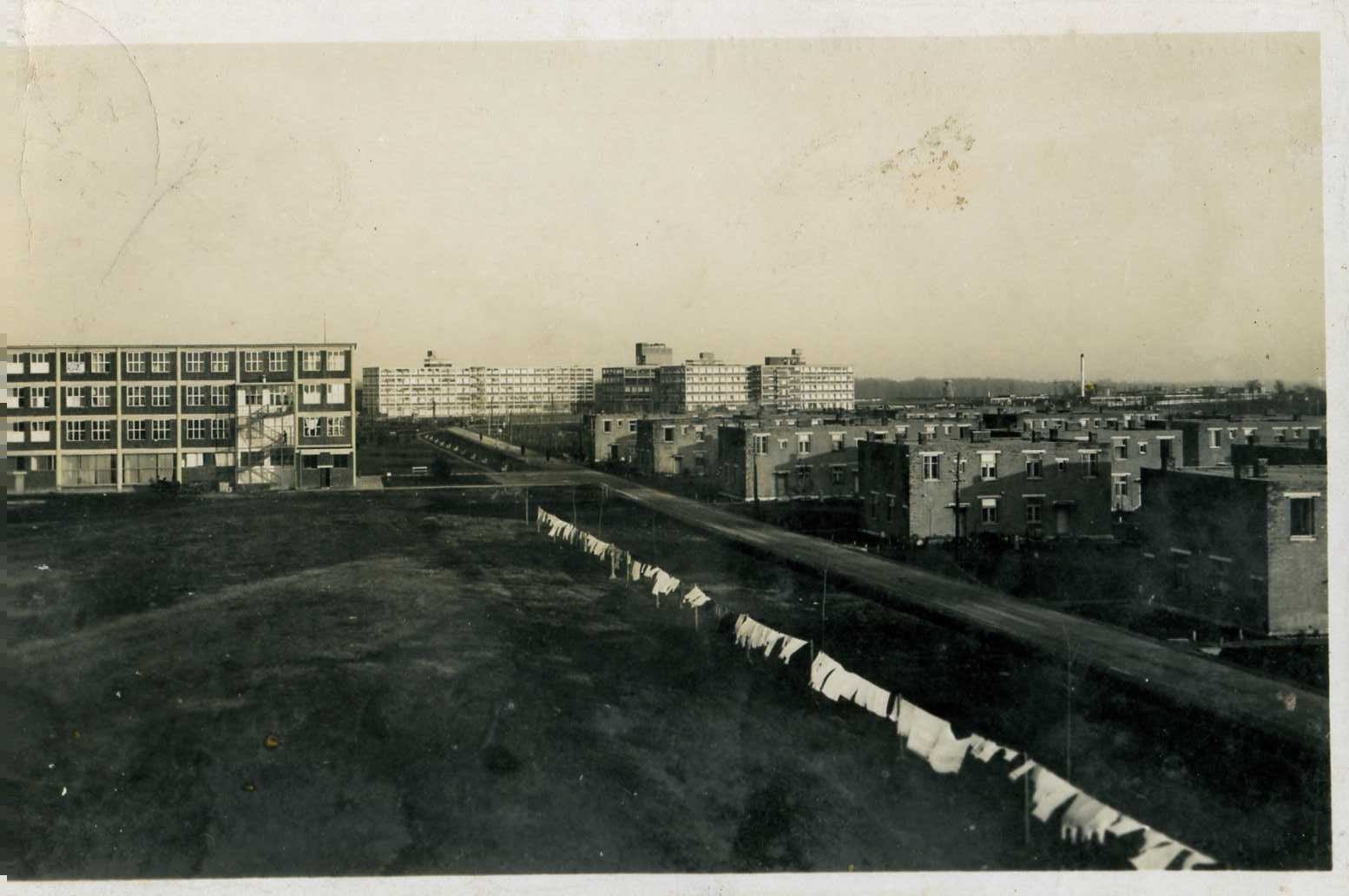
Factories and mass housing at Borovo Naselje

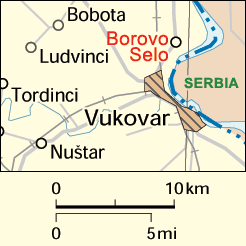
Borovo Naselje is the northern half of Vukovar, located between the old part of Vukovar and the village of Borovo (Croatian: Borovo Selo)

Borovo Naselje (Serbian Cyrillic: Борово Насеље; lit. 'Borovo Settlement') is a Vukovar borough located on the right bank of the Danube river in the Croatian region of Slavonia, 4 kilometers northwest of Vukovar town centre; elevation 90 m. The economy is based on rubber and shoe industries. The routes D2, D55 and D519 intersect in Borovo Naselje, connecting Vukovar to Osijek, Vinkovci and Dalj, respectively. The suburb originally developed as a part of Borovo village and its cadastral community but was subsequently separated and incorporated as a part of the town of Vukovar in 1980's.

== History ==
Borovo Naselje sprung up around the Borovo rubber products factory, built and owned by Tomáš Baťa before World War II. The entire town was built around the factory to provide housing and other necessary institutions for the employees. The town grew and finally merged with the neighboring town of Vukovar. After Borovo Naselje merged with Vukovar, it shed its name and became a part of Vukovar, but it's still known as Borovo Naselje among the locals.

Borovo was established on the outskirts of Vukovar by a Czech businessman Tomaš Bata on 7 June 1931 to begin with the manufacture of footwear.

== Sport ==
- HNK Borovo

== See also ==
- Borovo Municipality (different from Borovo Naselje)
- Vukovar–Borovo Naselje railway station

== Sources ==
- https://web.archive.org/web/20061212155050/http://www.borovo.hr/edanas.htm
