= Port of Vukovar =

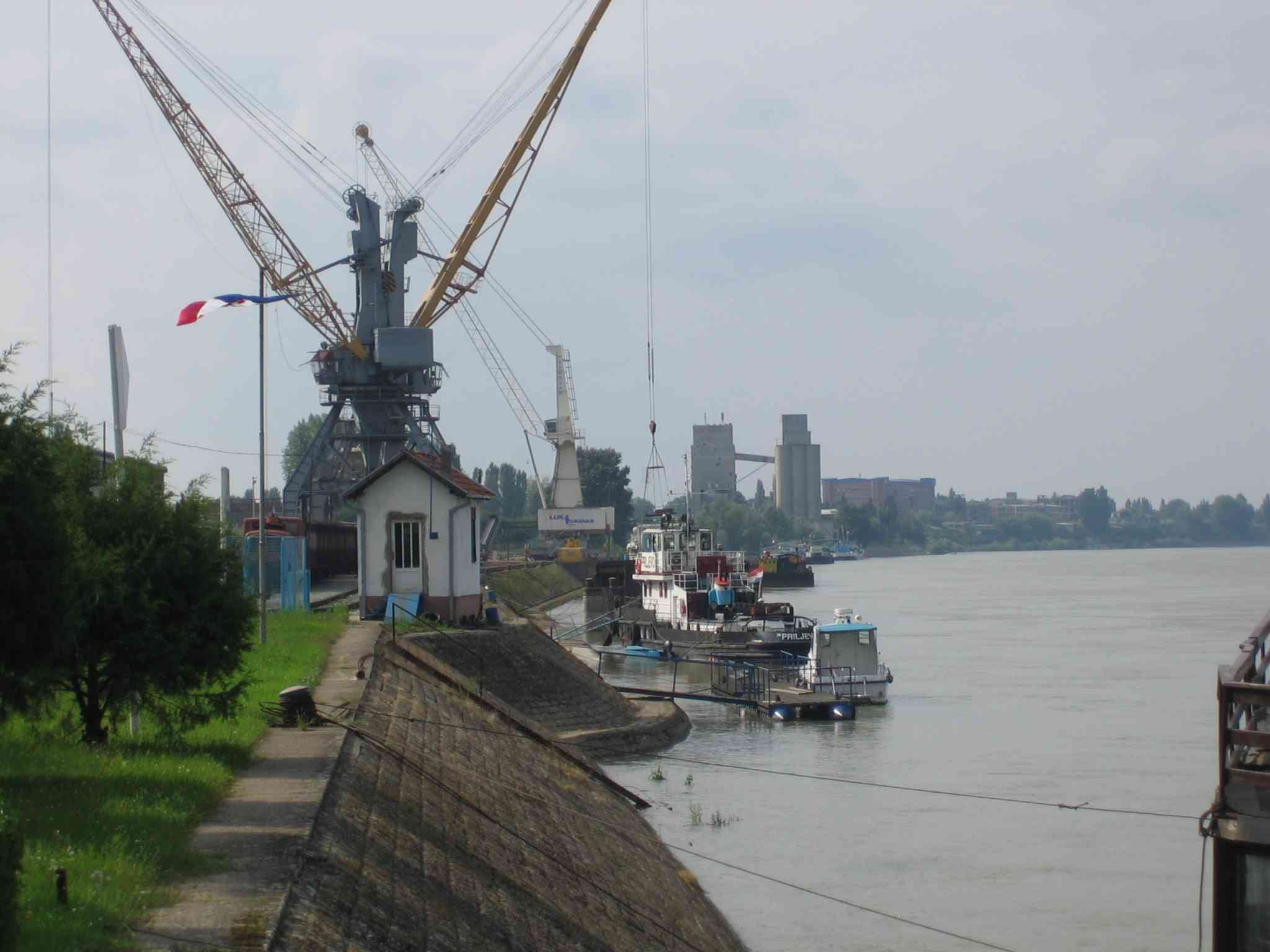
- Port of Vukovar
- Interactive map of Port of Vukovar
- Location within Croatia
- Native name: Luka Vukovar

Location
- Country: Croatia
- Location: Vukovar
- Coordinates: 45.366°N 18.981°E

Details
- Type of Harbor: river port

Port of Vukovar (Croatian: Luka Vukovar, Serbian: Лука Вуковар) is a Danube River port in eastern Croatian town of Vukovar. As the only Croatian river port on Danube (excluding minor tourist and fishing ports in Vukovar, Batina, Ilok), the Port of Vukovar developed during the 20th century into one of the largest ports in Central Europe and the largest river port of the former Socialist Federal Republic of Yugoslavia. At the time, the port transloaded up to 1.5 million tonnes of cargo annually. Today, the port is the largest river port in Croatia reaching the post-war peak in 2006 when 970,000 tonnes of cargo was transloaded. After that, the port was heavily affected by the Great Recession handling mere 175,000 tonnes of cargo in 2009 and only partially recovering by 2018 when 350,000 tonnes of cargo was transloaded. The port primarily serves business from Croatia and neighboring Bosnia and Herzegovina.

During the Battle of Vukovar port infrastructure was heavily damaged or completely destroyed to the point where operations were completely interrupted. Following the peaceful reintegration of the self-proclaimed Eastern Slavonia, Baranja and Western Sirmium after the completion of the UNTAES transitional administration Government of Croatia invested around 5.5 million Euros in the reconstruction of the port. A significant contribution of 650,000 Euros to the reconstruction of the port was provided by Belgium, one of the major contributor countries to the earlier process of the UNTAES-led peaceful settlement of the conflict in Croatian Podunavlje region.
