= Nemetin =

- Village (Selo)
- Location within Osijek-Baranja County Location within Croatia
- Coordinates: 45°32′23″N 18°46′26″E
- Country: Croatia
- County: Osijek-Baranja
- City: Osijek

Area
  - Total: 7.0 km^{2} (2.7 sq mi)

Population (2021)
  - Total: 77
  - Density: 11/km^{2} (28/sq mi)
- Time zone: UTC+1 (CET)
  - Summer (DST): UTC+2 (CEST)
- Postal code: 31000 Osijek
- Area code: 031
- Vehicle registration: OS

Nemetin (Hungarian: Drávanémeti) is a village in eastern Slavonia, Croatia, located near Osijek. It has a population of 139 (census 2011). It is administratively located in the City of Osijek.

== History ==
The village was the site of the largest prisoner exchange in the Croatian War of Independence when on August 14, 1992, 662 Croatian soldiers and civilians were returned from Yugoslavian custody. Most of the prisoners had been incarcerated in the Sremska Mitrovica camp in Serbia. A group of citizens of Bosnia and Herzegovina were also freed as part of the transfer, including Sulejman Tihić. A memorial to the event was unveiled on its fifteenth anniversary.

During the war the area was mined. In 2006, a business zone in the area was officially demined.
