= Jarmina =

- Municipality
- Municipality of Jarmina; Općina Jarmina
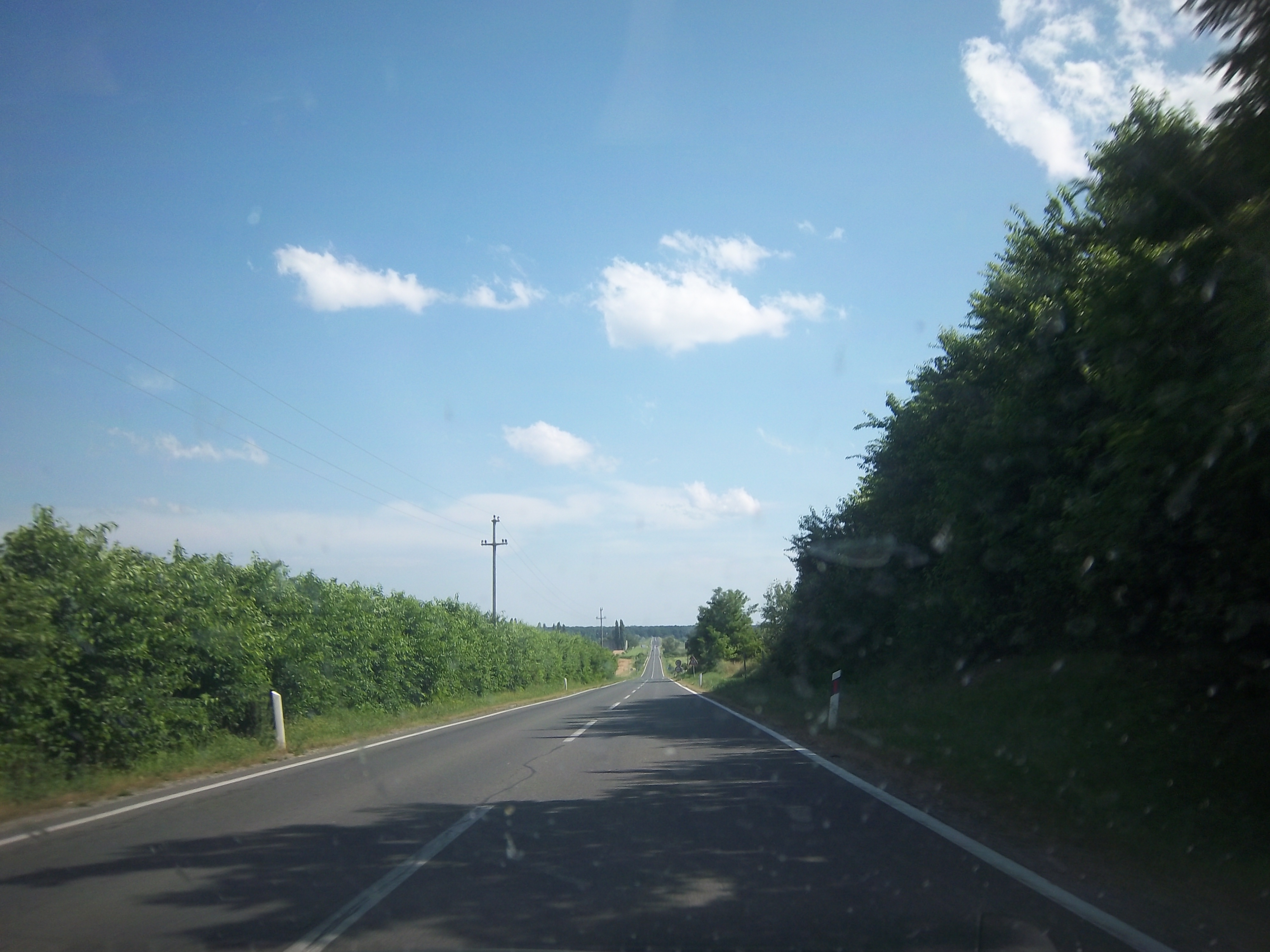

- Flag Seal

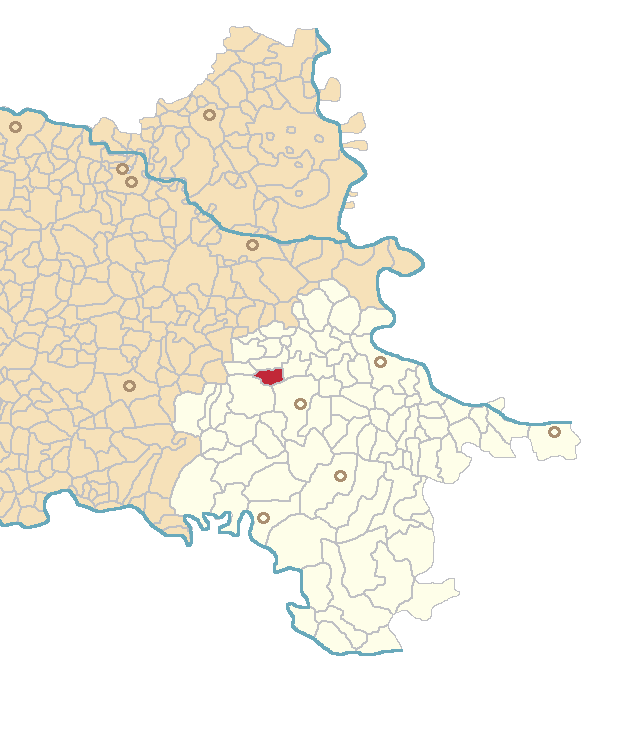

- Location in Croatia Jarmina (Croatia) Jarmina (Europe)
- Coordinates: 45°19′N 18°44′E
- Country: Croatia
- County: Vukovar-Syrmia County

Government
  - Mayor: Mario Matić (HDZ)

Area
  - Municipality: 13.0 km^{2} (5.0 sq mi)
  - Urban: 13.0 km^{2} (5.0 sq mi)

Population (2021)
  - Municipality: 2,016
  - Density: 155/km^{2} (402/sq mi)
  - Urban: 2,016
  - Urban density: 155/km^{2} (402/sq mi)
- Time zone: UTC+1 (CET)
  - Summer (DST): UTC+2 (CEST)
- Postal code: 32280
- Area code: 32
- Vehicle registration: VK
- Website: jarmina.hr

Jarmina is a village and municipality in the Vukovar-Syrmia County in Croatia.

== Name ==
In German the village is known as Jahrmein or Hermann, in Hungarian as Járomnaszentmiklós, and in Serbian Cyrillic as Јармина.

== Demographics ==
Following Ottoman retreat from the region, the Lordship of Nuštar was established, and the village became part of its domain.

First German settlers moved to the village from 1770 onwards while the school in German language was established in 1790. Historical records indicate that increase in tax burdens in 1770 forced the entire local Serb population as well as large majority of Croats to leave the settlement.

Before World War II there was a substantial German-speaking Danube Swabian population here.

According to the 2011 census, there are 2,458 inhabitants, 99.27% which are Croats.

== Characteristics ==
The municipality is home to a monument to defenders and civilians killed in the Croatian War of Independence which has the names of 15 deceased people.

Near Borinci, a hamlet between Jarmina and Vinkovci, there is a 171 metres tall guyed mast for FM-/TV-broadcasting.

Jarmina is unofficial name of the Vinkovci Marshaling yard and freight railway station.

== See also ==
- Vukovar-Syrmia County
- Syrmia

== Sources ==
- Barišić Bogišić, Lidija (2022). "Njemački jezik u Srijemskoj županiji u popisu stanovništva 1910. godine". O neslavenskom stanovništvu na vukovarskom području. Hrvatska sveučilišna naklada. ISBN 978-953-169-497-1.
