= Vukovar-Srijem County =

County in eastern Croatia

Vukovar-Srijem County Vukovarsko-srijemska županija (Croatian)
- County
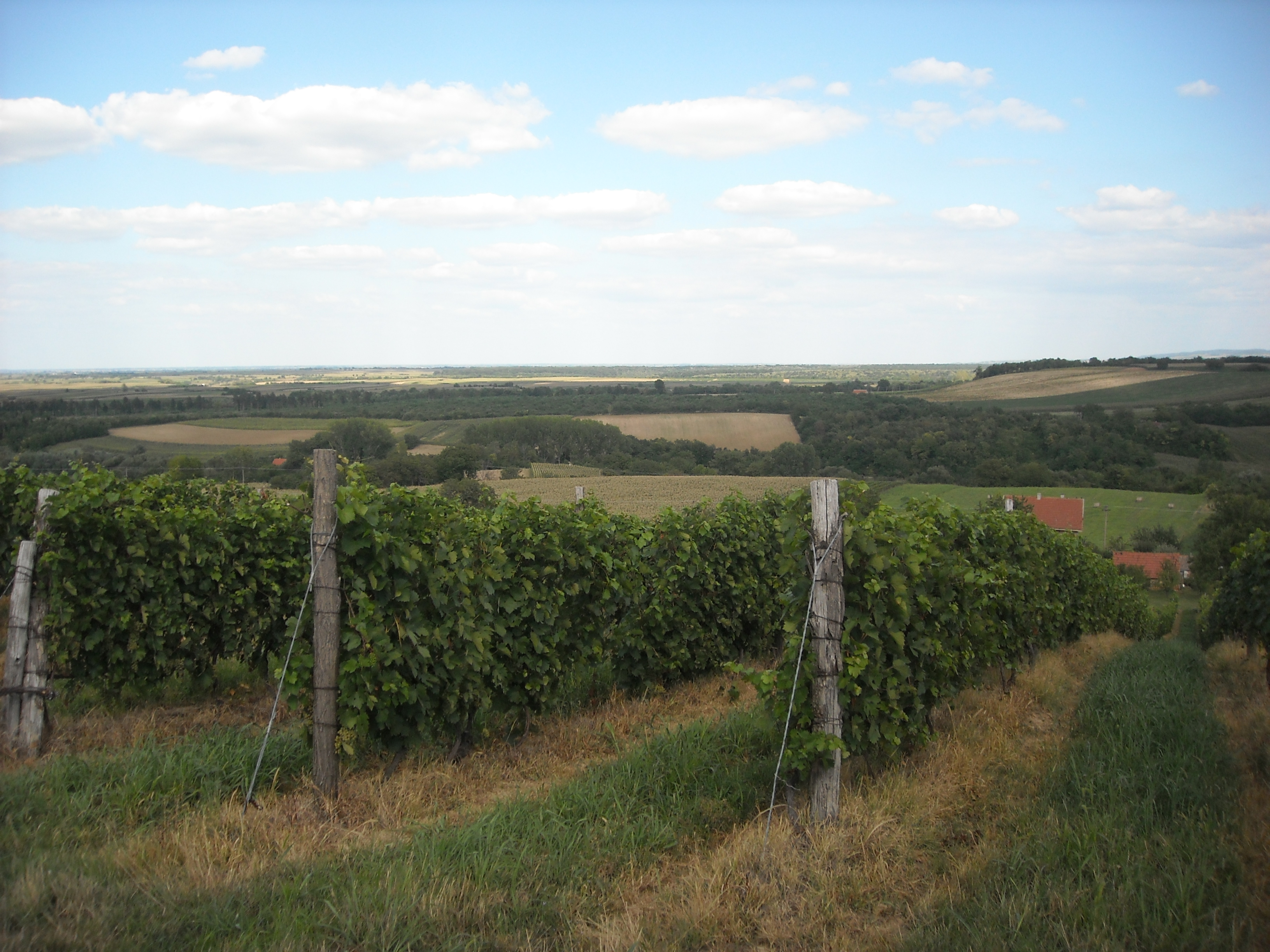
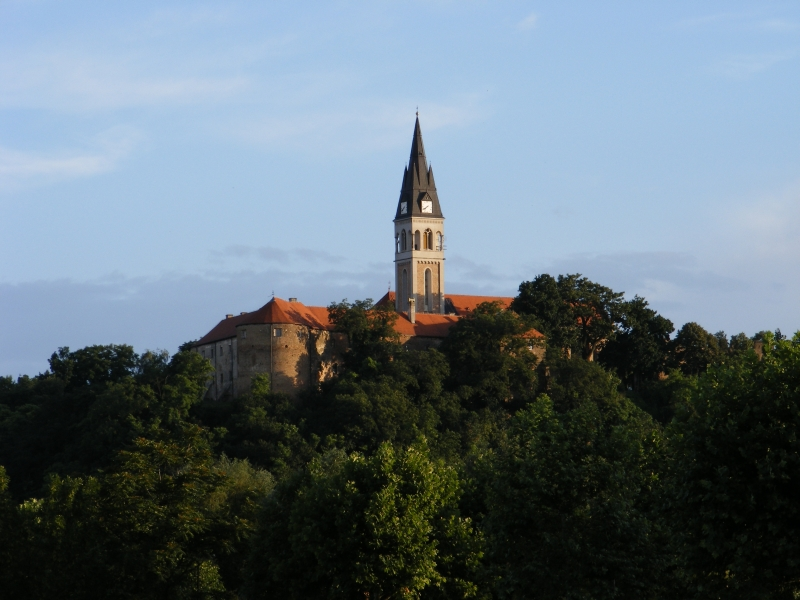
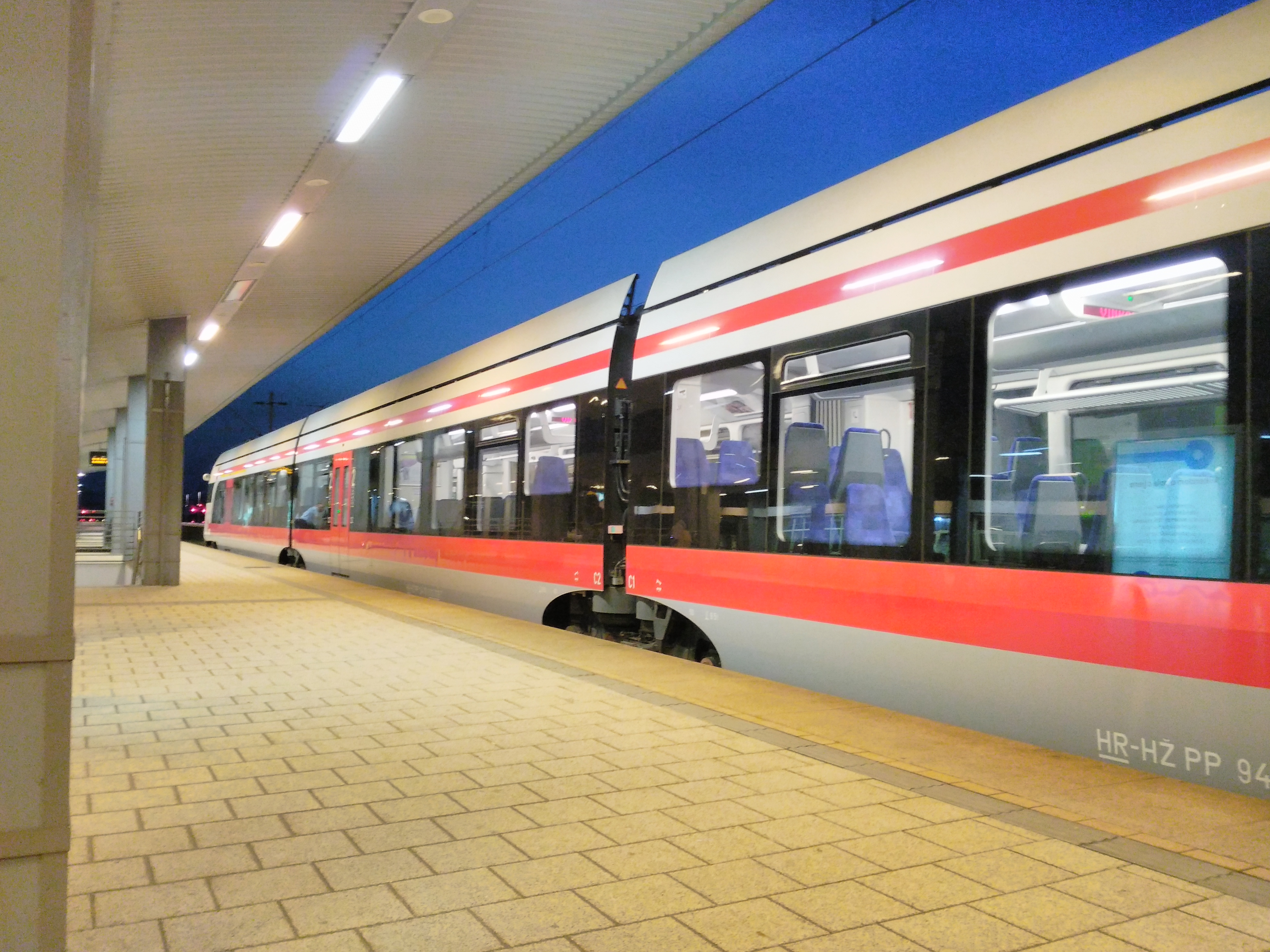
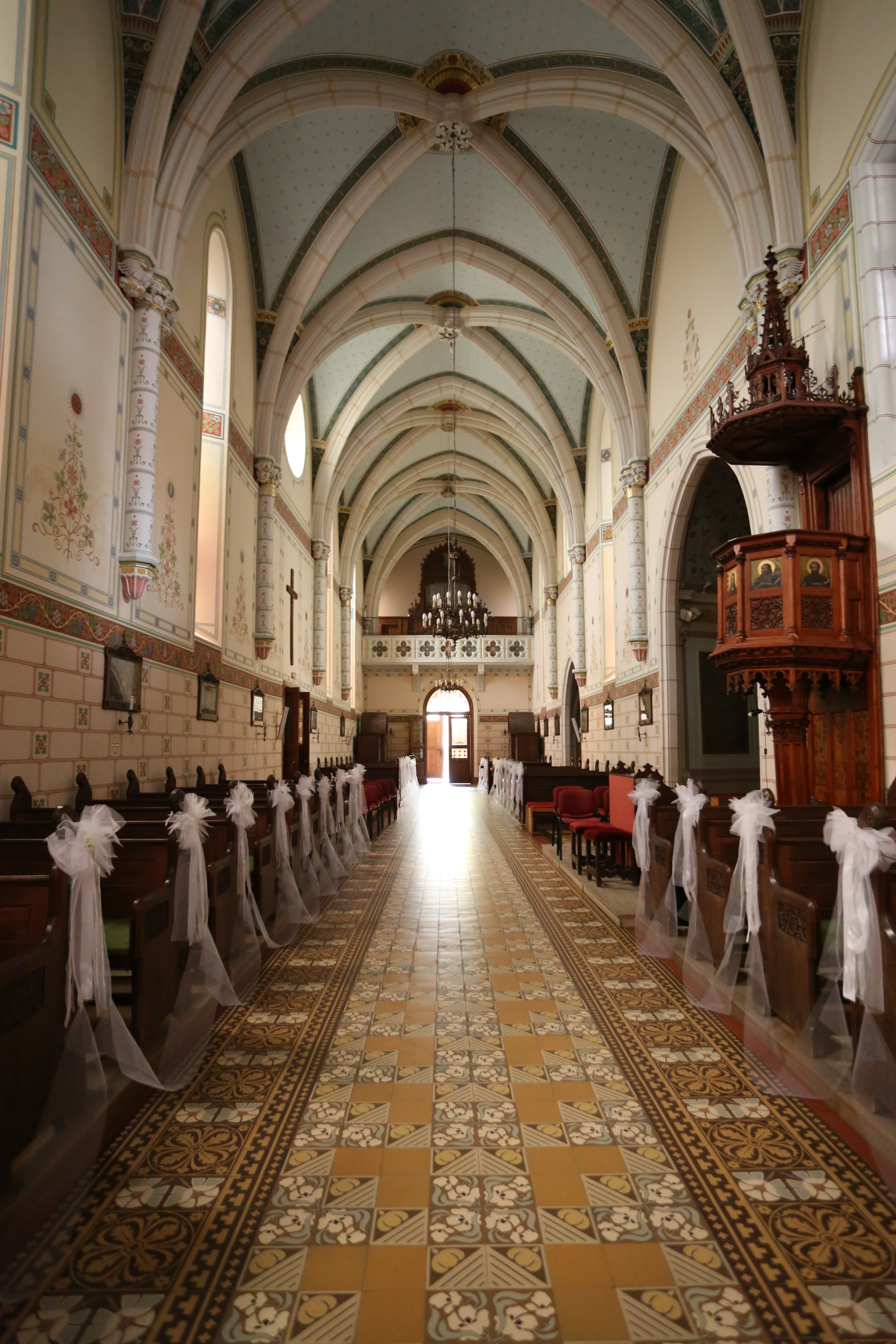
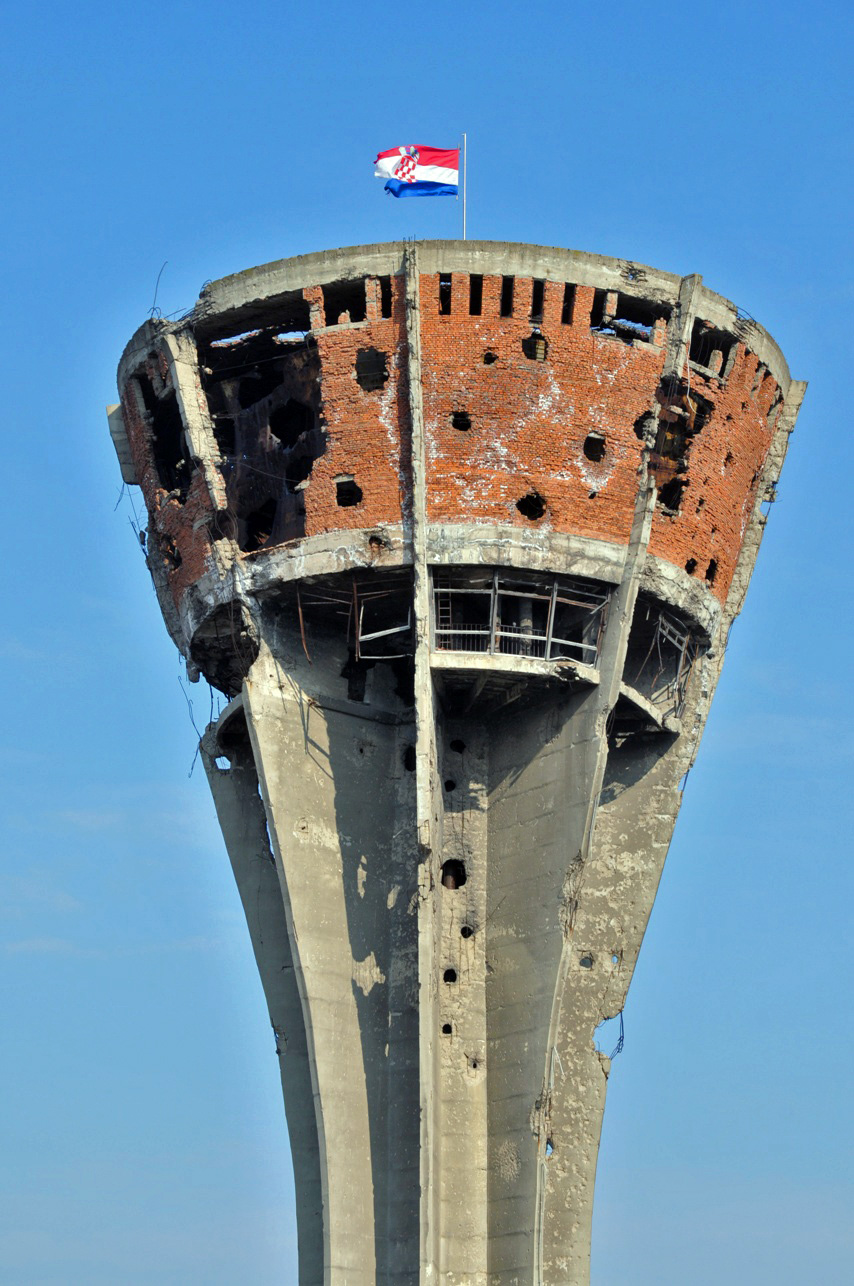
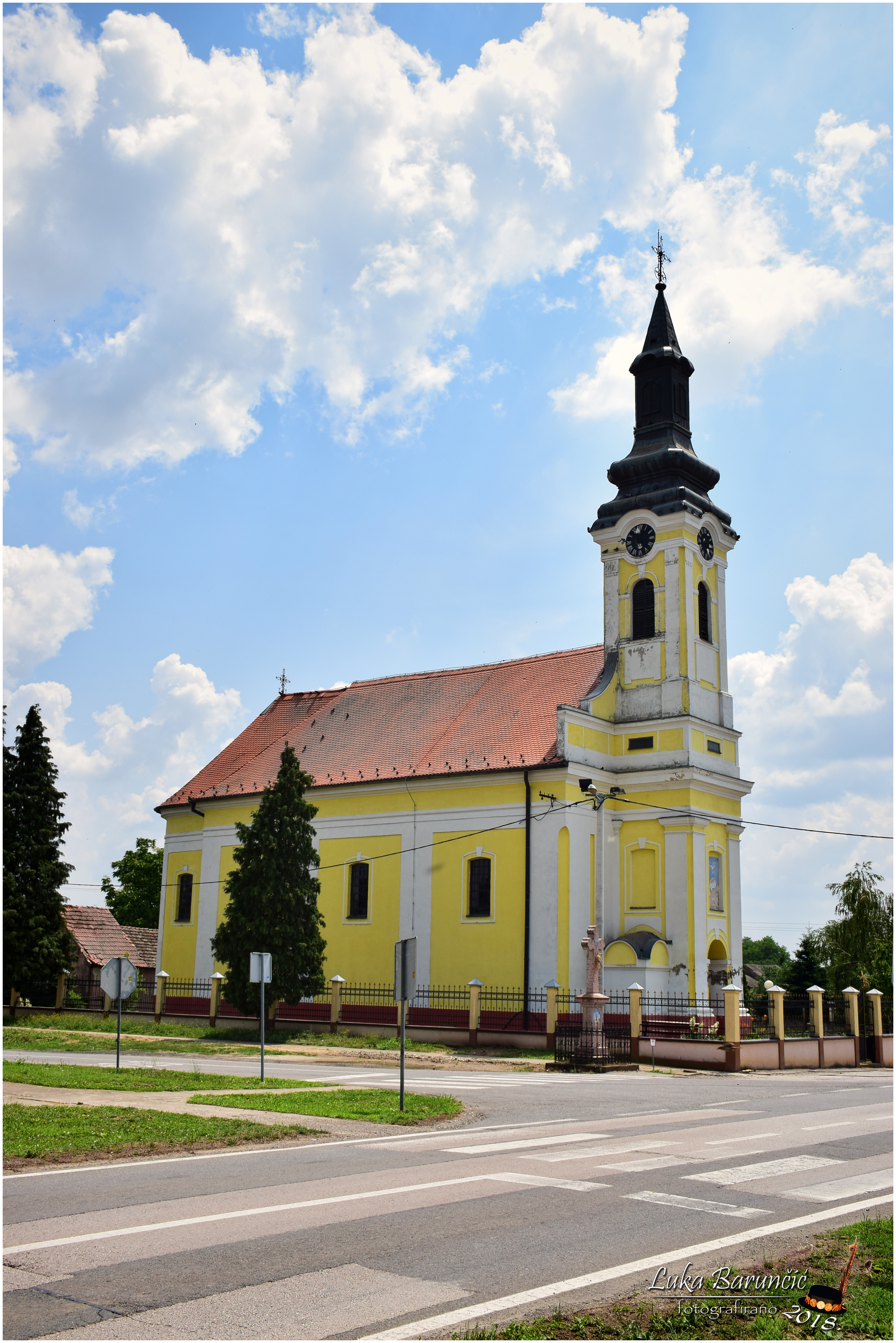
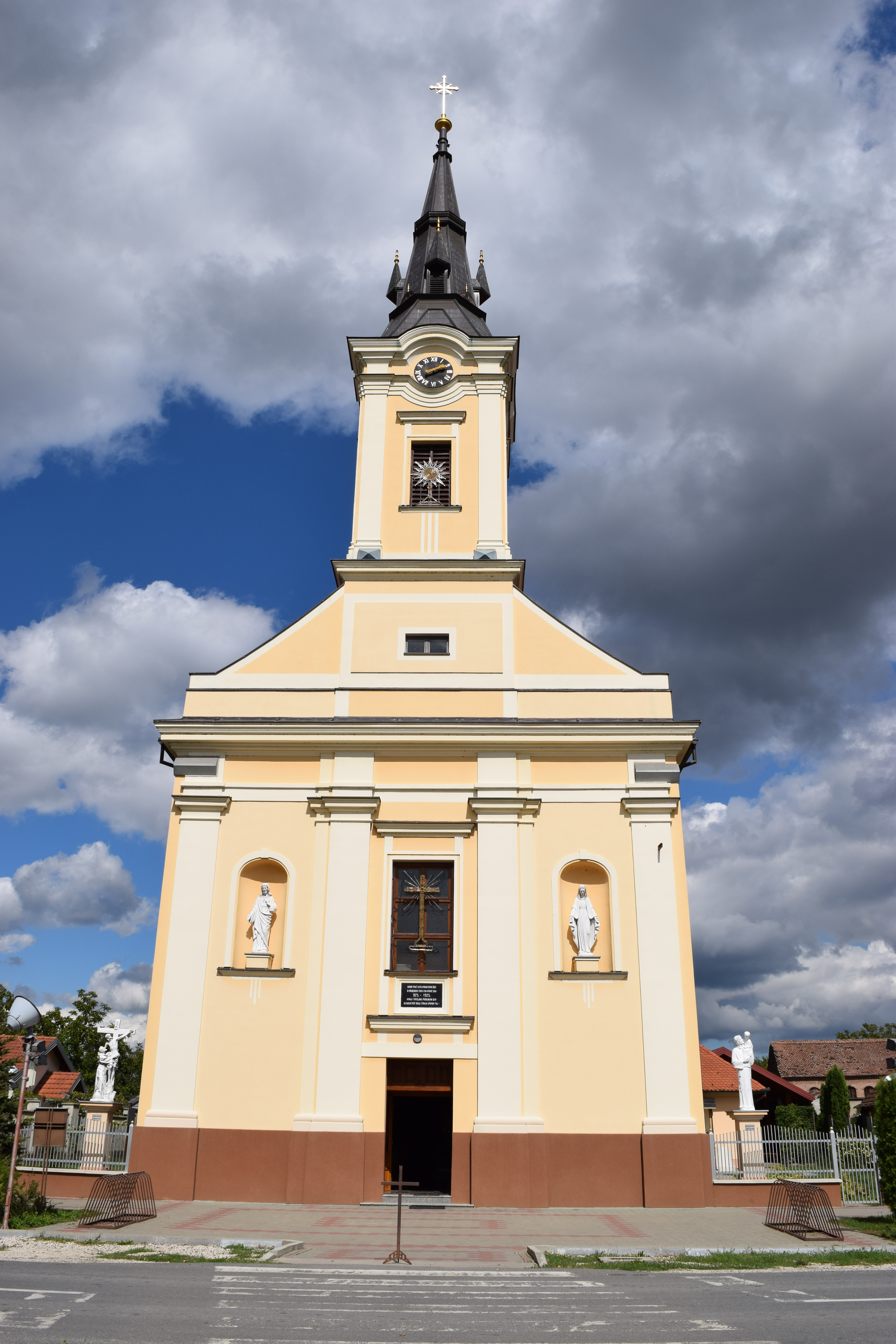
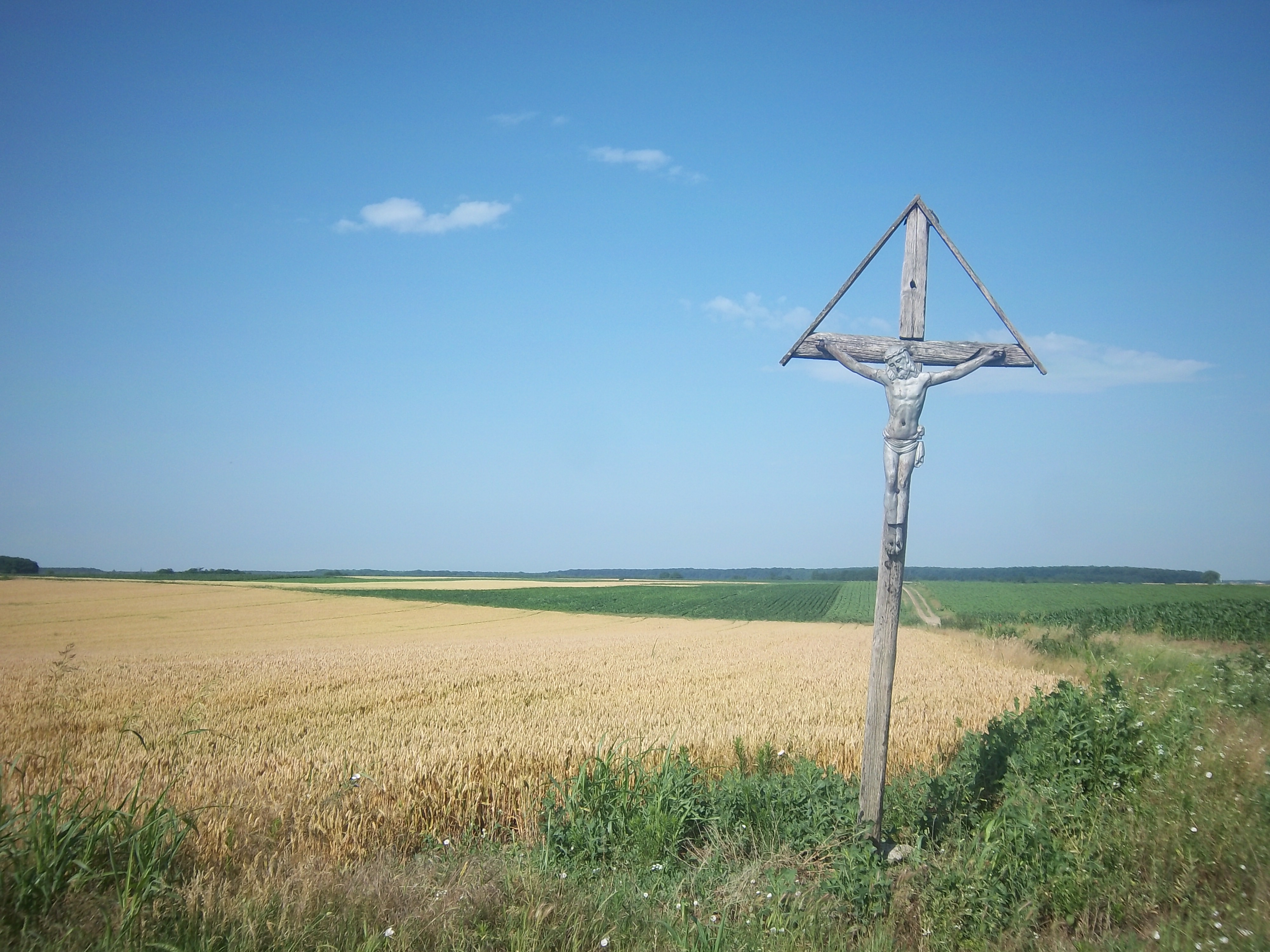
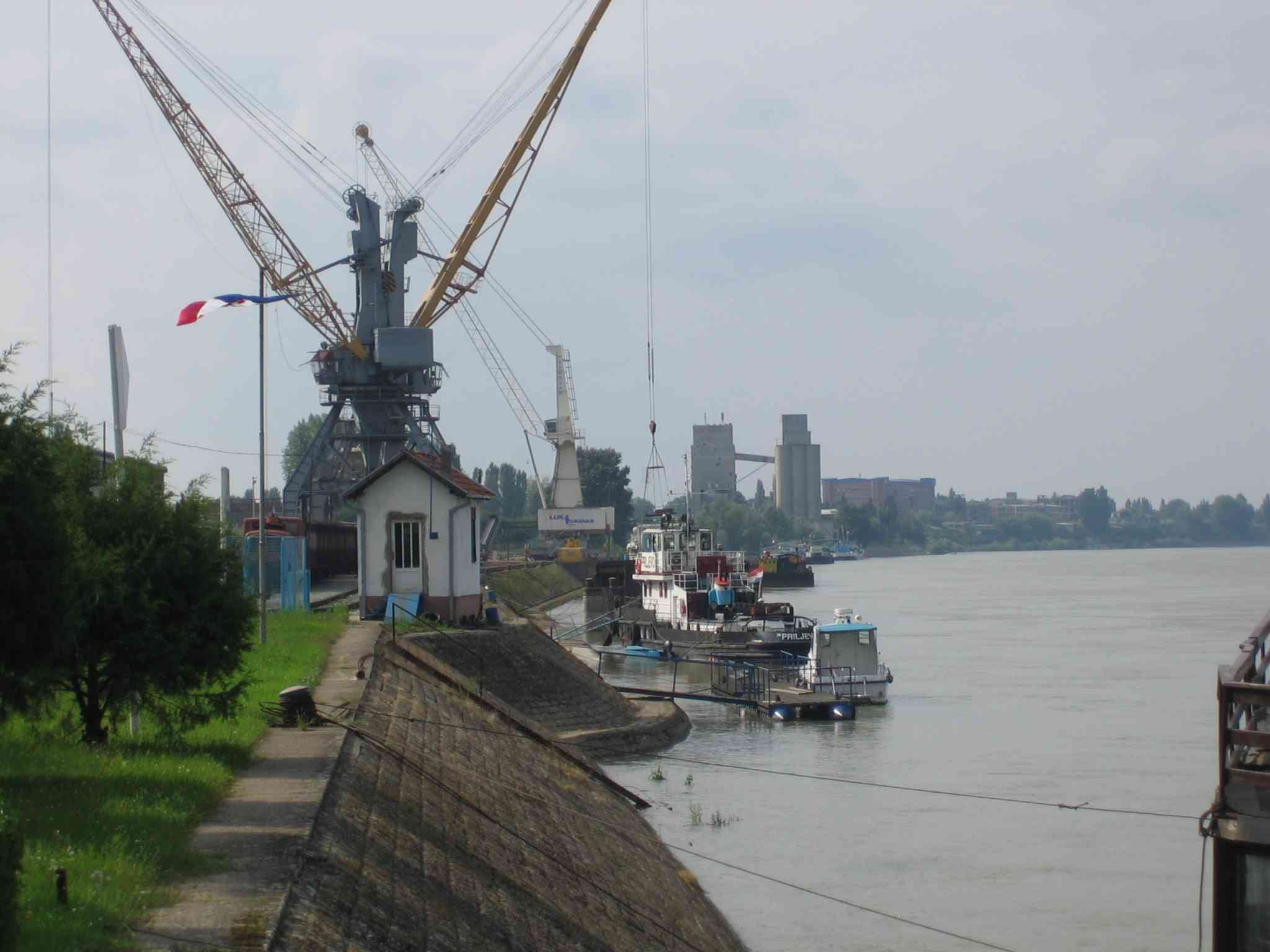
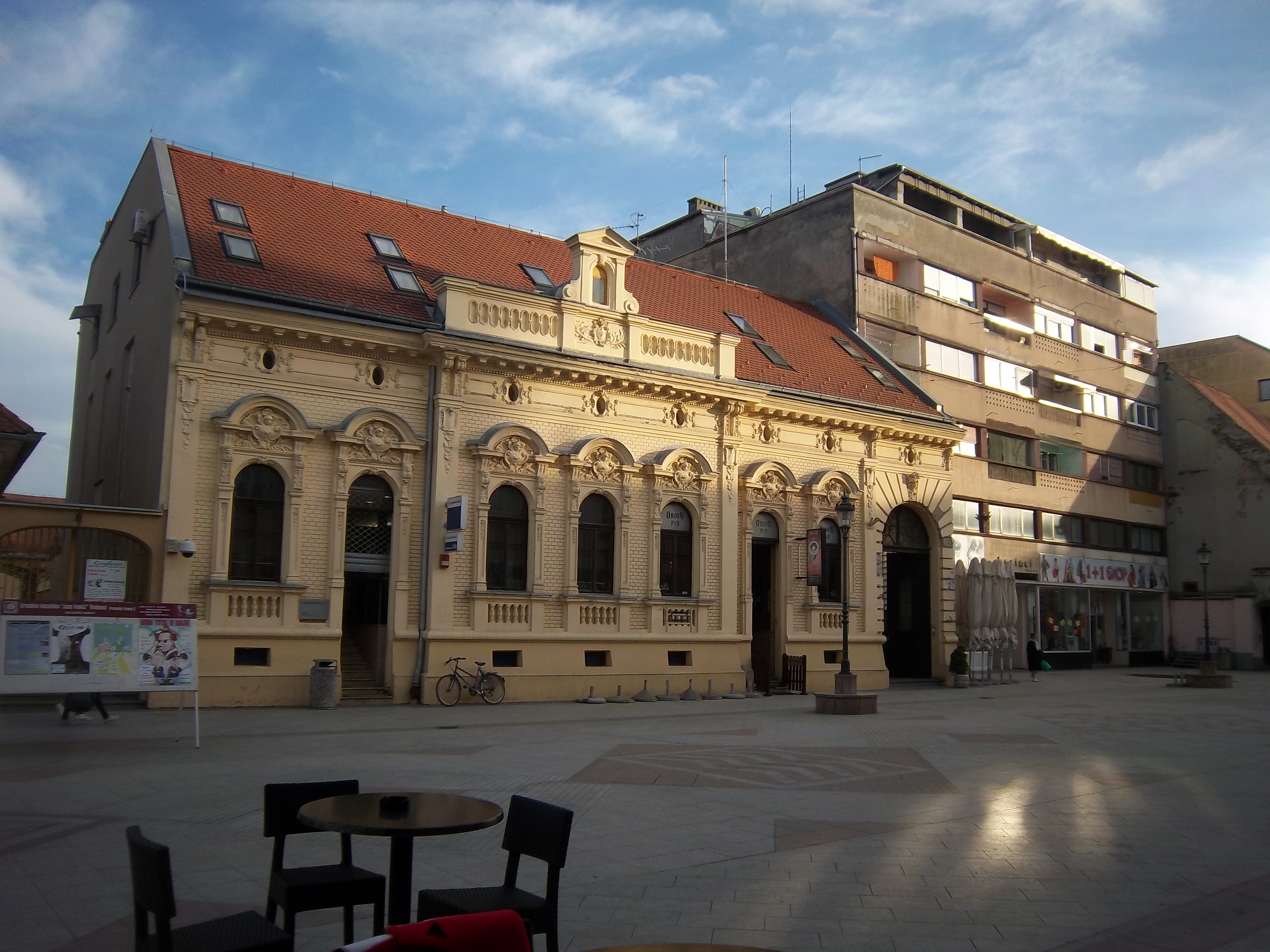
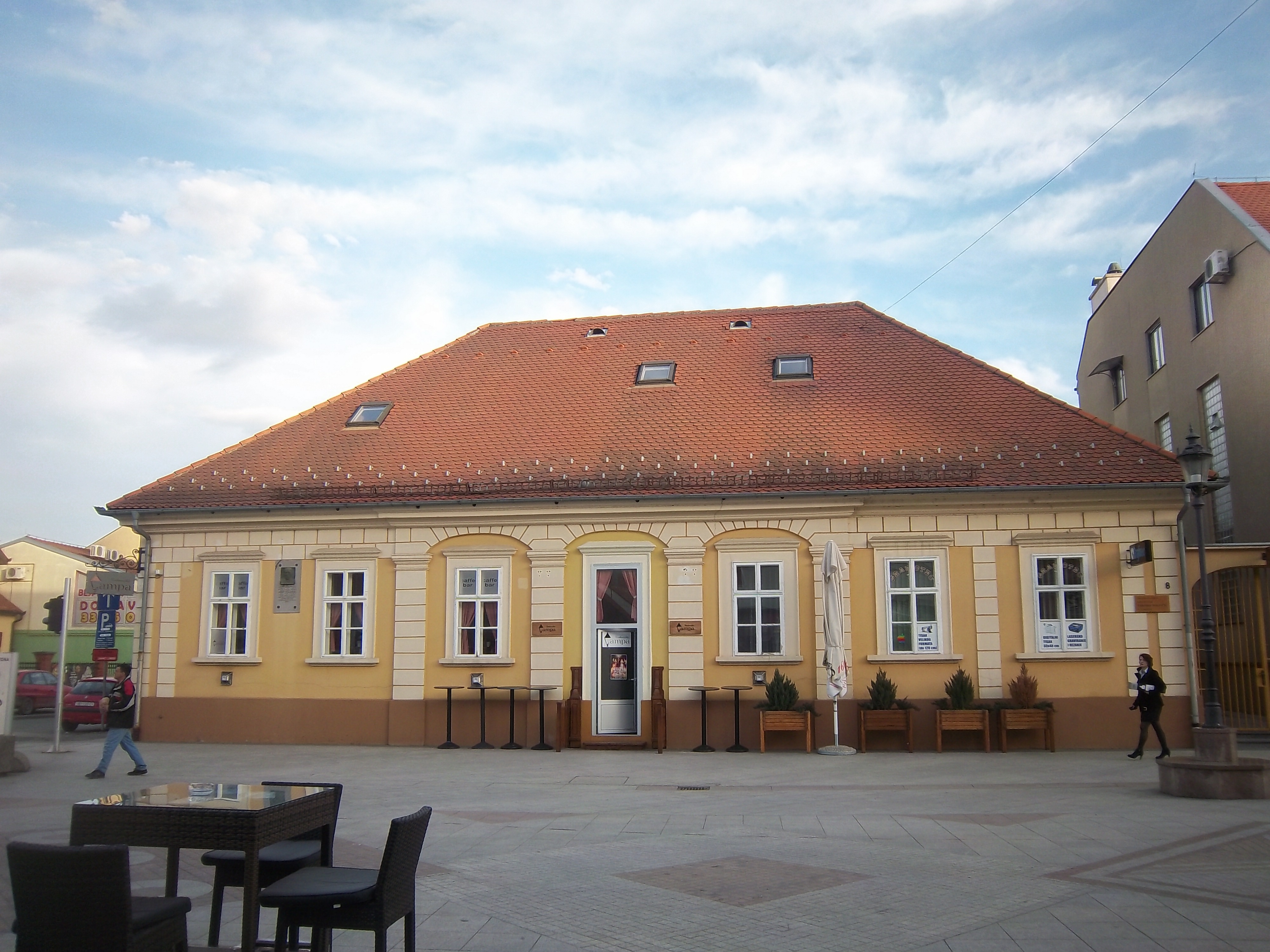
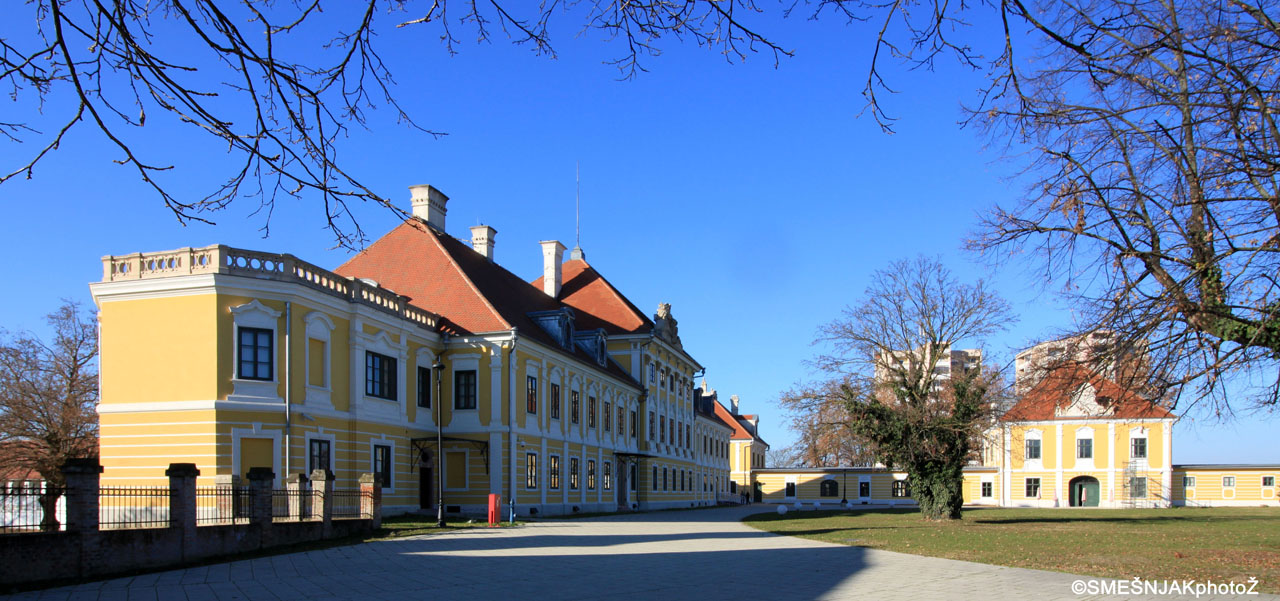
- Vukovar-Srijem County photos

- Flag Coat of arms

- Vukovar-Srijem County within Croatia
- Interactive map of Vukovar-Srijem County
- Coordinates: 45.3556°N 18.9983°E
- Country: Croatia
- County seat Largest City: Vukovar Vinkovci

Government
  - Župan (Prefect): Ivan Bosančić (HDZ)

Area
  - Total: 2,454 km^{2} (947 sq mi)
- Elevation: 78–224 m (256–735 ft)

Population (2021)
  - Total: 144,438
  - Density: 58.86/km^{2} (152.4/sq mi)
- Postal code: 32xxx
- Area code: 32
- ISO 3166 code: HR-16
- Vehicle registration: VK, VU, ŽU
- Assembly and Executive Headquarters: Palace of Syrmia County
- HDI (2022): 0.828 very high · 18th
- Website: Official site

Vukovar-Srijem County (Croatian: Vukovarsko-srijemska županija), Vukovar-Sirmium County or Vukovar-Syrmia County, named after the eponymous town of Vukovar and the region of Syrmia, is the easternmost Croatian county. It includes the eastern parts of the region of Slavonia and the western parts of the region of Syrmia, as well as the lower Sava river basin, Posavina and Danube river basin Podunavlje. Due to the overlapping definitions of geographic regions, division on Slavonia and Syrmia approximately divides the county vertically into north-west and south-east half, while division on Posavina and Podunavlje divides it horizontally on north-east and south-west half.

The county's seat is in Vukovar, a town on the Danube river while its biggest town and economic and transportation center is in Vinkovci, town with 33,328 inhabitants. Vinkovci served as a temporary de facto seat of the county during the Croatian War of Independence with some institutions still remaining in the town as of 2020. In 2011 the entire population of the county was 180,117. Other than Vukovar and Vinkovci, settlements with town status are Ilok, Otok and Županja. Vukovar-Srijem County is ethnically most diverse county in Croatia with Croat majority and significant Serb, Hungarian, Pannonian Rusyns, Bosniak, Ukrainian and Slovak communities.

The county was one of the most affected regions by the Croatian War of Independence and today belongs to the group of the least developed counties in Croatia with significant part of it being classified as an Areas of Special State Concern.

== Name ==
The name of the Vukovar-Srijem County is derived from the name of its seat town of Vukovar and the standard Croatian name of the region of Syrmia. The name is formed out of the possessive adjective for the two eponymous with literal English translation being the Vukovarian-Syrmian County. The larger historical Syrmia County also covered large parts of modern Serbia and the easternmost part of Brod-Posavina County (see § Habsburg Empire and Austria-Hungary).

=== Name in other languages ===
In other minority languages used officially in certain towns, municipalities or villages of the Vukovar-Srijem County the entity is known as: Serbian Cyrillic: Вуковарско-сријемска жупанија / Вуковарско-сремска жупанија, Hungarian: Vukovár-Szerém megye, Slovak: Vukovarsko-sriemska župa, Rusyn: Жупа Вуковар-Срѣм and Ukrainian: Вуковарсько-Сремська жупанія.

In historically relevant languages the county is known as German: Gespanschaft Vukovar-Syrmien, Latin: Cornacensis-Sirmiensis, Hebrew: מחוז ווקובאר-סריימיה and Church Slavonic: Вльковарьскосрємьскꙑ жоупаниѩ.

== History ==
=== Pre-Roman history ===
The area of the county has been inhabited since Neolithic times famous for its Vučedol culture and La Tène culture sites. It includes exceptionally rich archaeological sites, listed among the most important sites of southern Europe many of which are preserved today at the Vučedol Culture Museum.

=== Roman Sirmium ===
During the classical times, the Danube river was a part of the Danubian Limes. It was a birthplace of Roman emperors Valentinian I and Valens while the entire region was oriented towards the nearby Sirmium, a city declared one of four capitals of the Roman Empire in 294.

=== Ottoman period ===
During the Ottoman Hungary period the region was a part of the Sanjak of Syrmia with seat in contemporary town of Ilok.

=== Habsburg Empire and Austria-Hungary ===
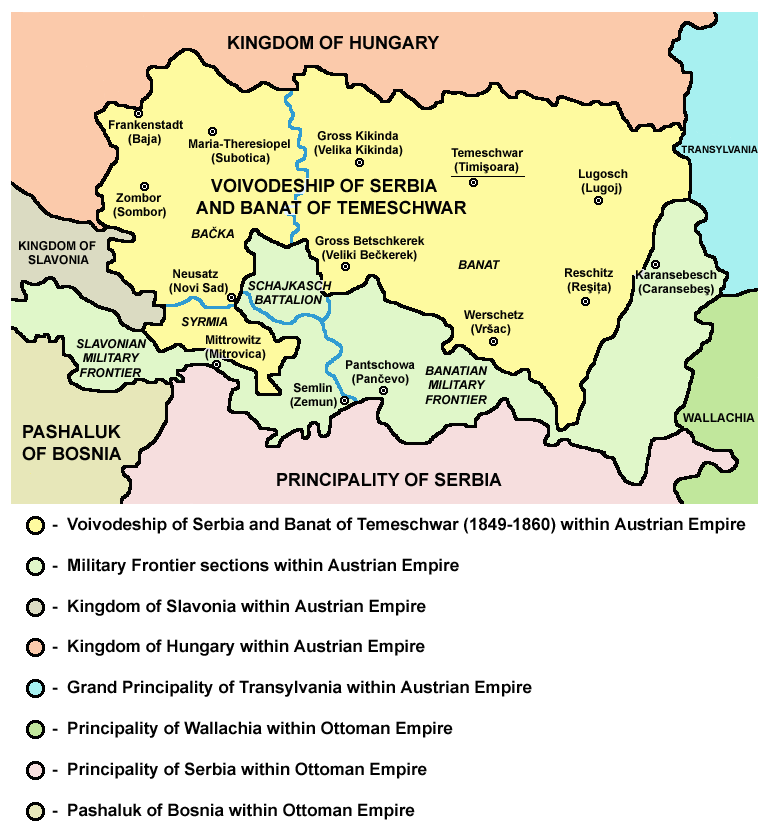
The Voivodeship of Serbia and Banat of Temeschwar (yellow) and the eastern part of Essek county (grey) in the 1850s. The Military Frontier is shown in pale green.

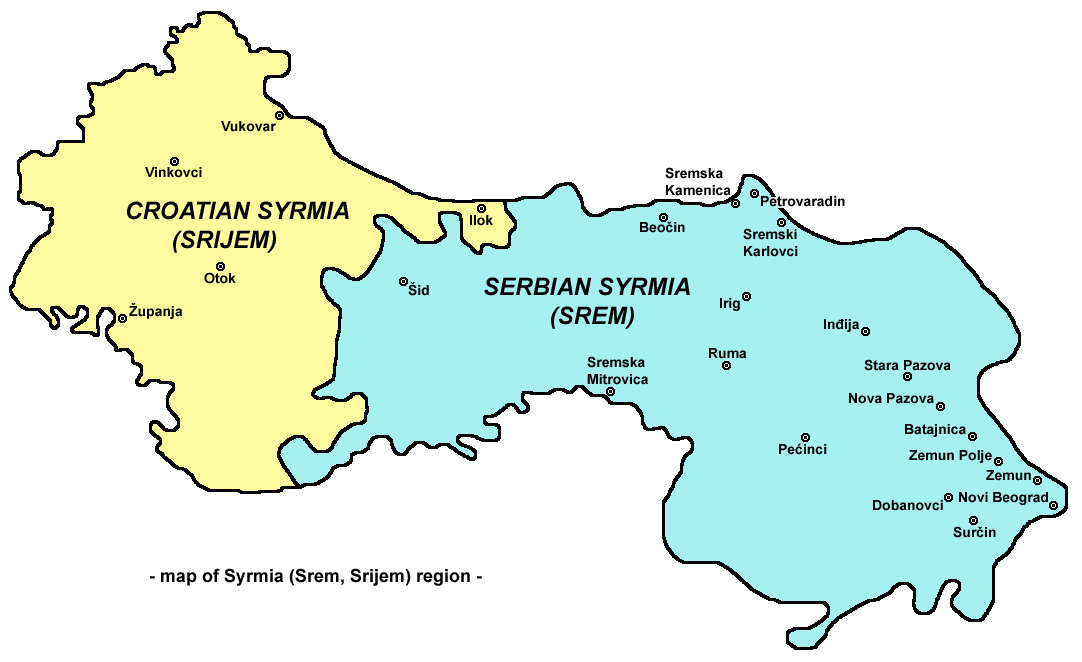
The extent of the Habsburg Syrmia County from 1881 showing the modern border between Croatia (yellow) and Serbia (cyan)

The Ottoman Empire retreated from the region after the signing of the 1699 Treaty of Karlowitz. The region became a part of the Habsburg Kingdom of Slavonia and Slavonian Military Frontier as part of the Habsburg Monarchy (until 1804), Austrian Empire (1804–1867) and Austria-Hungary (1867–1918).

The historical Slavonian Syrmia County, with its seat also in Vukovar, existed for most of the period between 1745 and 1922.

During the revolutions of 1848 in the Austrian Empire the historical county and parts of the Military Frontier, including most of modern Vukovar-Srijem County, briefly became part of the short-lived self-declared Serbian Vojvodina. In the aftermath, from 1849, the Military Frontier was restored and the historical county was split: the eastern part became part of the Neusatz (Novi Sad) district of the Voivodeship of Serbia and Banat of Temeschwar crown land; the western part, which broadly corresponded to the northern part of modern Vukovar-Srijem County, including Vukovar, was merged into the Essek (Osijek) county of Slavonia. The border between the two was broadly similar, but not identical, to the modern Croatia-Serbia border; notably, Ilok lay just to the east of the border, and it ran through what is today Bapska, dividing Bapska-proper (in Neusatz) and Novak (in Essek).

In 1860 the pre-1848 divisions, including the historical Syrmia County, were restored.

In 1881 the Slavonian Military Frontier was abolished and large parts of it were merged into Syrmia County. Between 1881 and 1922 it covered the contemporary county and the area of modern-day Srem District (except Mačvanska Mitrovica), Zemun, Surčin and New Belgrade subdivisions of Belgrade, easternmost parts of Brod-Posavina County and Petrovaradin, Beočin, Neštin, Vizić and Sremski Karlovci.

=== Kingdom of Yugoslavia ===
Some of the villages in the region were settled by Salonica front Serbian soldiers and families as a reward for their contribution to war efforts.

The old Habsburg Syrmia County remained a subdivision of the Kingdom of Serbs, Croats and Slovenes (Yugoslavia from 1929) until 1922; it then became an oblast (with the same borders) until 1929. From 1929 it was split between the Sava and Danube Banovinas until 1939; the modern Vukovar-Srijem County was mostly contained with Sava Banovina. In 1939 Sava Banovina was merged into the Banovina of Croatia and its borders extended, encompassing all of the modern county.

=== World War II ===
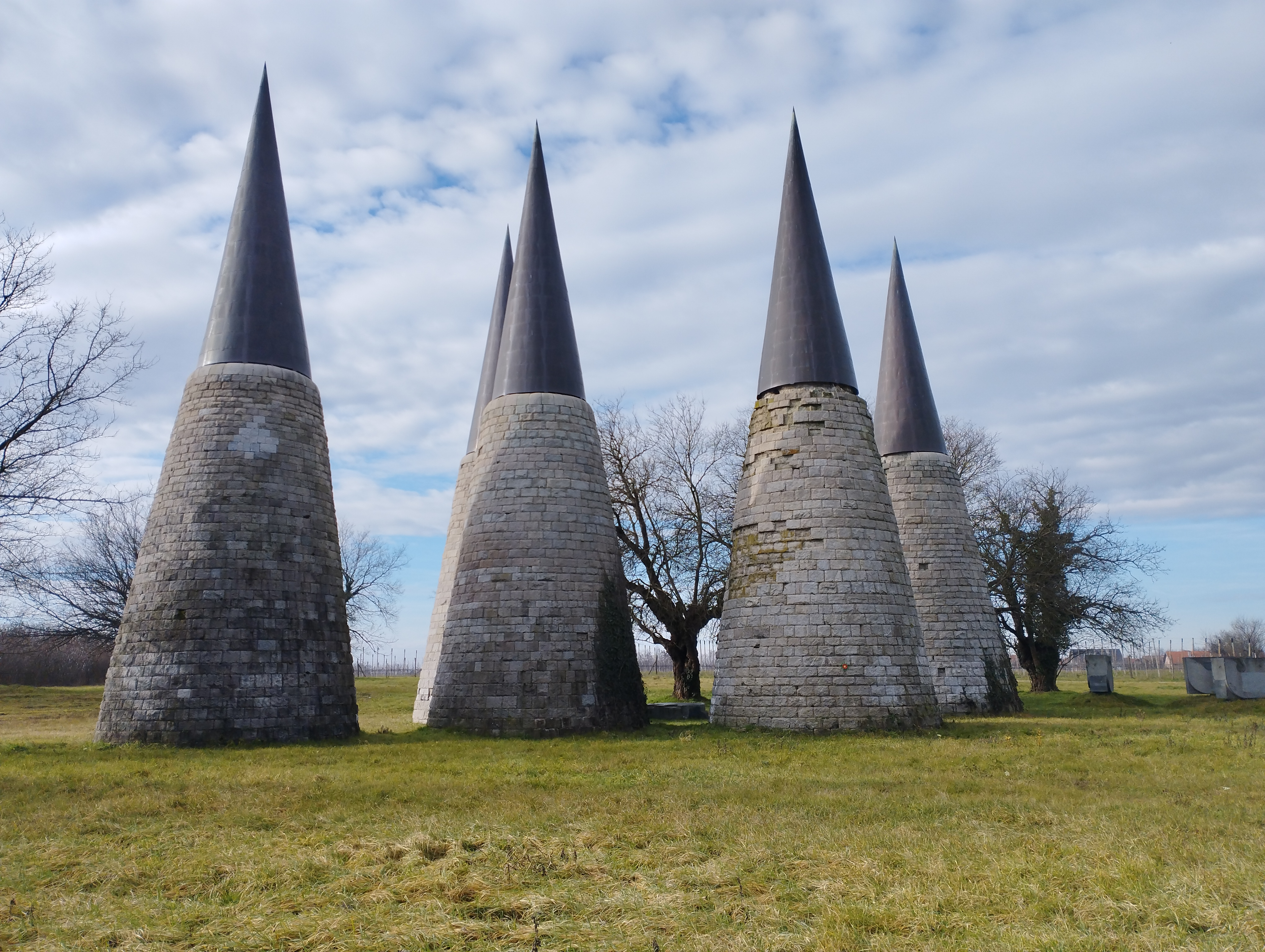
Dudik Memorial Park

During World War II the region was part of the Nazi puppet Independent State of Croatia, mostly within Vuka County, with southern parts falling within Posavje County. The puppet state and Nazi forces conducted criminal policy of Holocaust, Genocide of Serbs in the Independent State of Croatia and Romani genocide by destruction of Vinkovci Synagogue, devastation of Vukovar Synagogue, Dudik Killings, Ivanci massacre and other crimes in the region. Yugoslav Partisans, Europe's most effective anti-Axis resistance movement, was active at the Fruška Gora mountain and in villages alongside Zagreb–Belgrade railway (today M105 railway). The region was liberated after the Syrmian Front was broken.

=== Socialist Federal Republic of Yugoslavia ===
In the period of the Socialist Republic of Croatia Vukovar became an important industrial center. For a long period during the existence of the Socialist Republic of Croatia the area of the modern day county was organized in three municipalities of Vinkovci, Vukovar and Županja. At the time Croatian municipalities were on average significantly larger units (both in territory and population) than contemporary municipalities of Croatia.

=== Croatian War of Independence ===
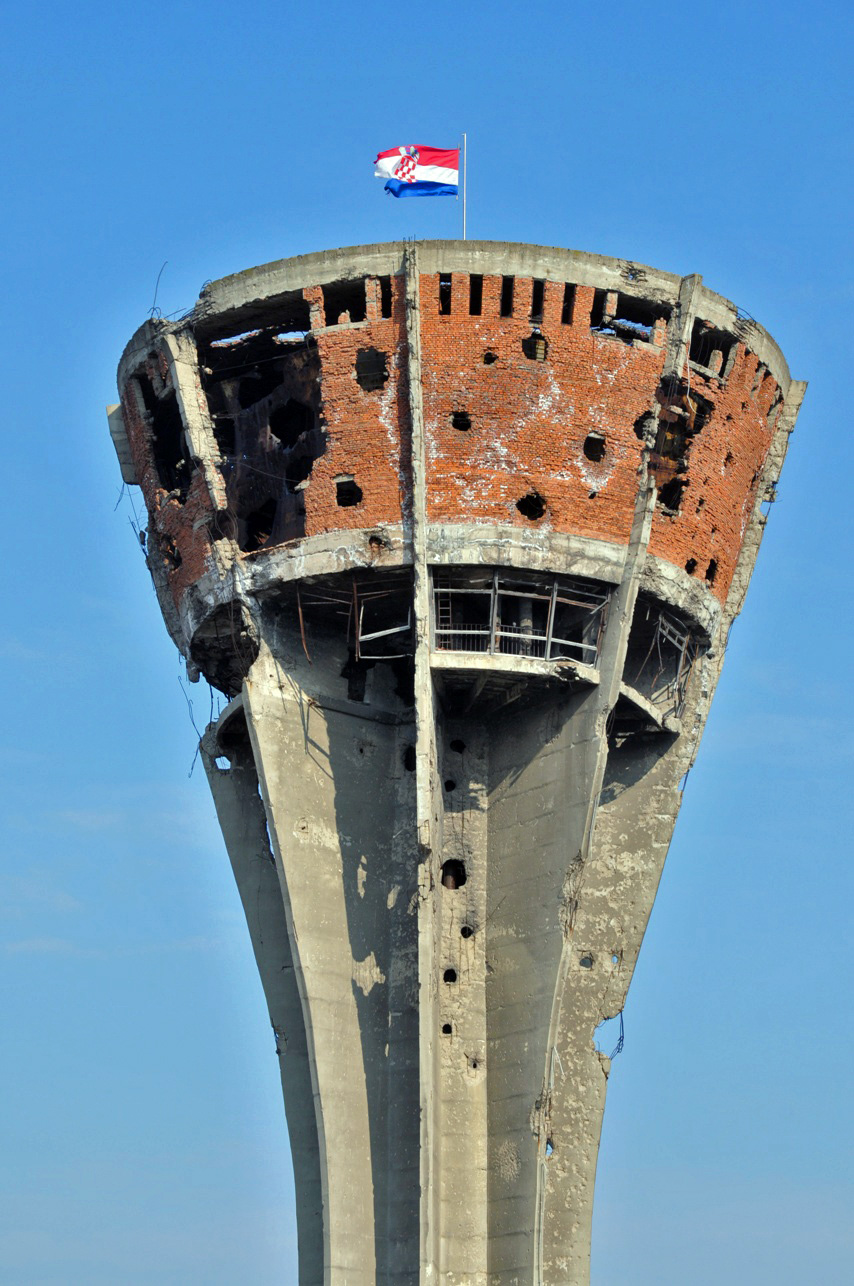
Vukovar water tower

The Battle of Vukovar was an 87-day siege of Vukovar by the Yugoslav People's Army (JNA), supported by various paramilitary forces from Serbia, between August and November 1991. Before the Croatian War of Independence the Baroque town was a prosperous, mixed community of Croats, Serbs and other ethnic groups. As Yugoslavia began to break up, Serbia's President Slobodan Milošević and Croatia's President Franjo Tuđman began pursuing nationalist politics. In 1990, an armed insurrection was started by Croatian Serb militias, supported by the Serbian government and paramilitary groups, who seized control of Serb-populated areas of Croatia. Battle of Borovo Selo was one of the first armed clashes which led to the War. Despite the battle the events in Eastern Slavonia developed slower than in Krajina and were under much stronger and more direct influence from the central government in Belgrade. They however led to the establishment of self-proclaimed SAO Eastern Slavonia, Baranja and Western Syrmia which subsequently joined the as well self-declared Republic of Serbian Krajina. The region was ethnically cleansed of its Croat and some other non-Serb population leading to some of the most serious violation of human rights including Erdut killings, Lovas killings, Dalj massacre, Tovarnik massacre, Vukovar massacre and other crimes. Within the Republic of Serbian Krajina there was no direct physical connection between the Krajina and Eastern Slavonia, and no later than 1994 there was effective detachment and schism between Pale-aligned and more hardline Knin administration and more compromising and Belgrade aligned Vukovar administration. Complete military defeat of Krajina during the Operation Storm and perception that similar or more devastating fate may follow up in Eastern Slavonia increased willingness to compromise and commitment on all sides to pursue peaceful resolution of the conflict. As the result of the War Vukovar became known in majority Croat community as the Hero City and is today a common emotional patriotic or nationalist reference commemorated officially as a Remembrance Day public holiday on November 18.

=== United Nations administration ===
On 12 November 1995 Erdut Agreement between the authorities of the Republic of Croatia and the local Serb authorities of the Eastern Slavonia, Baranja and Western Syrmia was reached enabling peaceful resolution to the Croatian War of Independence in eastern Croatia. The agreement was acknowledged by the United Nations Security Council in its Resolution 1023 and subsequent resolutions dealing with the newly established United Nations Transitional Administration for Eastern Slavonia, Baranja and Western Sirmium. The mission successfully demilitarized the region and returned it to government's control over the two year period. It enabled the return of Croat refugees and provided inter-communal power-sharing mechanisms in police and other institutions as well as the establishment of minority institutions such as the Serb National Council and regional Joint Council of Municipalities.

=== Contemporary period ===
In the aftermath of the direct United Nations Administration OSCE Mission to Croatia was present in the region.

== Geography ==
Vukovar-Srijem County lies in the far northeastern part of Croatia, in the regions of eastern Slavonia and west Syrmia. Total area of the county is 2,454 km^{2}. Two major rivers run through the county, the Danube and the Sava, and two smaller rivers, the Bosut and the Vuka. The Bosut is a tributary of the Sava river, while the Vuka is a tributary of the Danube. Small Bosut tributaries within the water-land Spačva basin are Spačva and Studva. The county's highest point is Čukala, on the Fruška Gora, at 294 meters (965 ft), and its lowest point is on the Spačva River at 78 meters (256 ft) within the Spačva basin. Vukovar-Srijem County has a moderate continental climate, with a yearly average of 11 °C (52 °F). The county has an average annual rainfall of 650 mm (26 in) in the east, up to 800 mm (31 in) in western parts (25.6 to 31.5 in).

The Vukovar-Srijem County borders the Osijek-Baranja County to the north and west, Brod-Posavina County to the west, Bosnian and Herzegovinian entity of Republika Srpska to the south and south-west and Brčko District to south, Posavina Canton to south-west and Serbian Srem District to south-east and South Bačka District to north-east. The Croatian Government has claims on the islands of Šarengrad and Vukovar on the Danube river, which are under Serbian control.

== Demographics ==
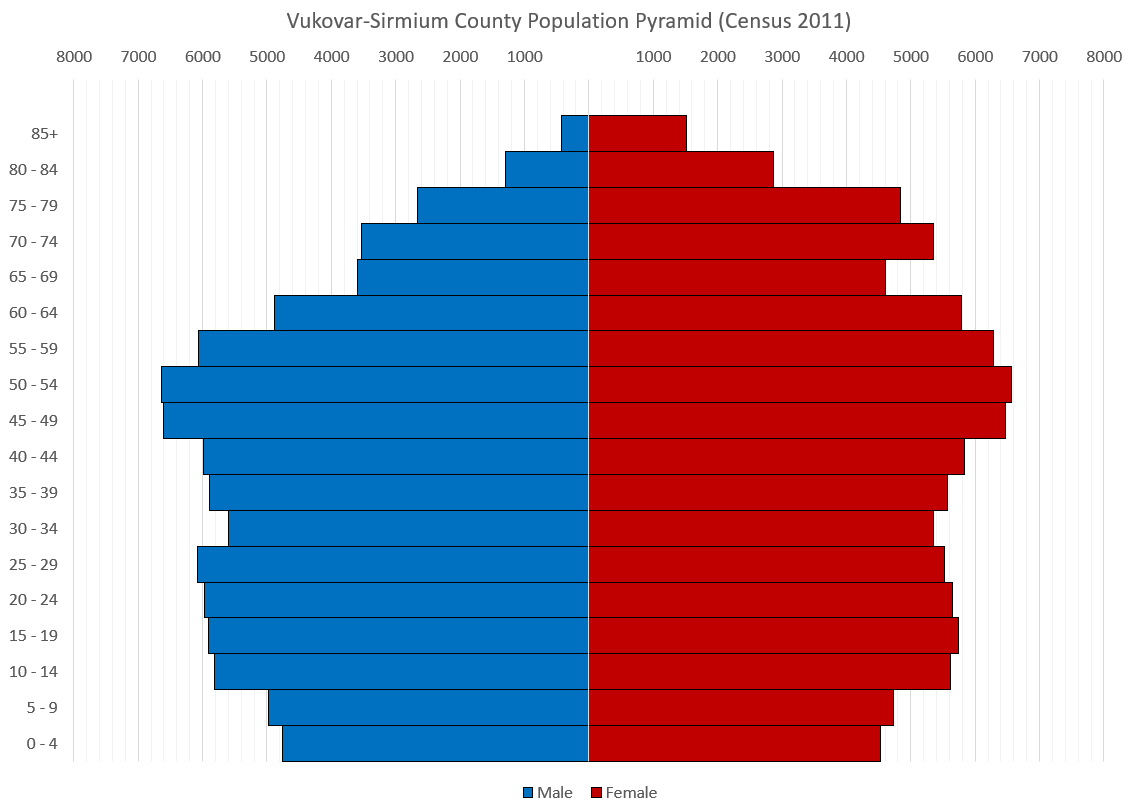
Population pyramid of Vukovar-Srijem county per the 2011 Census

Historical populations of Vukovar-Srijem County

Year	Pop.	±%
1857	86,678	—
1869	101,029	+16.6%
1880	104,801	+3.7%
1890	117,918	+12.5%
1900	125,569	+6.5%
1910	129,754	+3.3%
1921	127,417	−1.8%
1931	139,340	+9.4%
1948	152,472	+9.4%

Year	Pop.	±%
1953	166,956	+9.5%
1961	193,224	+15.7%
1971	217,115	+12.4%
1981	223,919	+3.1%
1991	231,241	+3.3%
2001	204,768	−11.4%
2011	179,521	−12.3%
2021	144,438	−19.5%

Source: Naselja i stanovništvo Republike Hrvatske 1857–2001, Croatian Bureau of Statistics, Zagreb, 2005

The population of Vukovar-Srijem County at the time of the 2021 Census was 143,113, making it the 7th most populous county of Croatia. Historically, the population was highest in 1991 when it peaked at a little over 230 thousand inhabitants.

Vukovar-Srijem County: Population trends 1857–2021
v

population	86768	101029	104801	117918	125569	129754	127417	139340	152472	166956	193224	217115	223919	231241	204768	179521	144438
	1857	1869	1880	1890	1900	1910	1921	1931	1948	1953	1961	1971	1981	1991	2001	2011	2021

Sources: Croatian Bureau of Statistics publications

According to the 2021 census, Croats with 116,847 individuals constitute 81.65% of the county's entire population. Ethnic Serbs are the largest ethnic minority, making up 13.49% or 19,309 individuals. Other ethnic groups are Hungarians 1,180 (0.82%), Bosniaks 1,110 (0.78%), Rusyns 965 (0.67%), Slovaks 842 (0.59%). The largest Hungarian community is in Tordinci (18.65% of total population in the municipality), for Rusyns is Bogdanovci (19.48%), and for Bosniaks is Gunja (28.92%); while 78% of total Slovak population in the county live in Ilok.

Vukovar-Srijem County is, according to the census data, the county with the highest percentage of ethnic non-Croats in the entire country. Serbs are the largest minority community followed by Hungarians, Rusyns, Slovaks and Bosniaks. Historically large Yugoslav, Danube Swabians, Jewish, Vlachs, Turkish and other communities lived in the region. Census data on Roma in Croatia may not always be reliable due to stigma associated with free expression of ethnic identity in this community.

Area of modern-day Vukovar-Srijem County experienced number of spontaneous or state organized voluntary and involuntary waves of violent and peaceful emigration, immigration and politically motivated population persecution. Members of the same ethnic group in addition to social class may often distinguish themselves according to the time spent in the region (autochthonous or new and relatively new communities) and place of origin. Many of villages in the county are result of colonization. Among other, Austria-Hungary supported colonization of Mikluševci and Petrovci, Protestant Germans settled in Banovci, Kingdom of Yugoslavia supporting colonization of Karadžićevo, World War II puppet Independent State of Croatia established the village of Bokšić, Socialist Federal Republic of Yugoslavia supported resettlement of the World War II persecuted Serb communities from Bosnia-Herzegovina and Dalmatia in the region.

The Croatian War of Independence represents one of the last major demographic developments in the region. Croat communities were initially expelled from the self-proclaimed SAO Eastern Slavonia, Baranja and Western Syrmia. After the Operation Flash, Serbian refugees from western Slavonia settled in the region, yet the majority of them, together with some of the locals, emigrated during and after the reintegration process. After the war, the Croatian state organised the return of expelled Croats. It provided housing for a significant number of ethnic Croat refugees from Bosnia and Herzegovina Posavina, which became part of the Republika Srpska.

After the 2013 enlargement of the European Union, all communities in the county were affected by significantly increased levels of emigration to Western Europe (Germany, Ireland, Austria, United Kingdom). Vukovar-Srijem County was one of the Croatian counties most directly exposed to the European migrant crisis, yet it served almost exclusively as a transit point. As a response to this development, a new permanent immigration centre was opened in the village of Tovarnik.

=== Minority populations ===
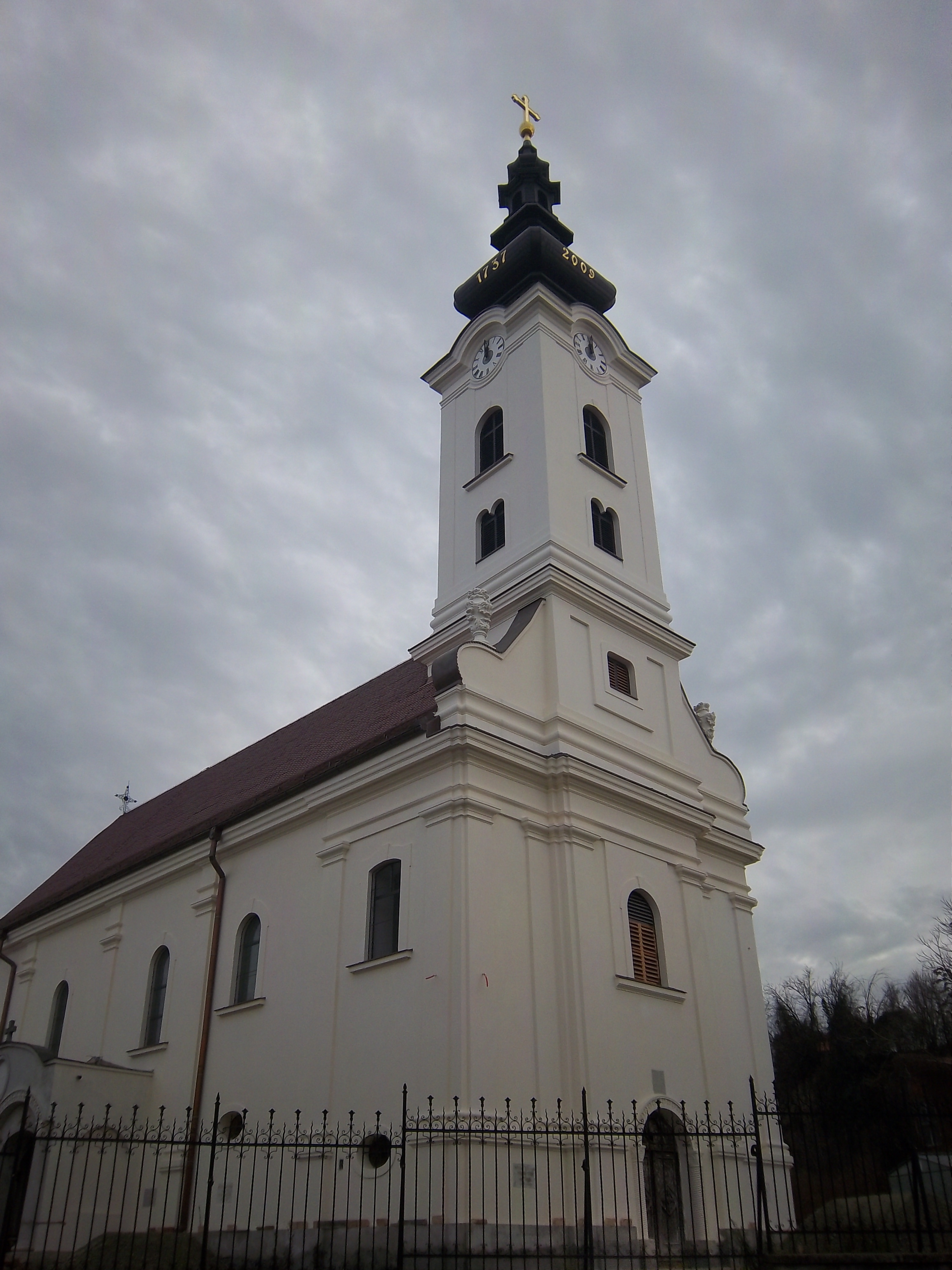
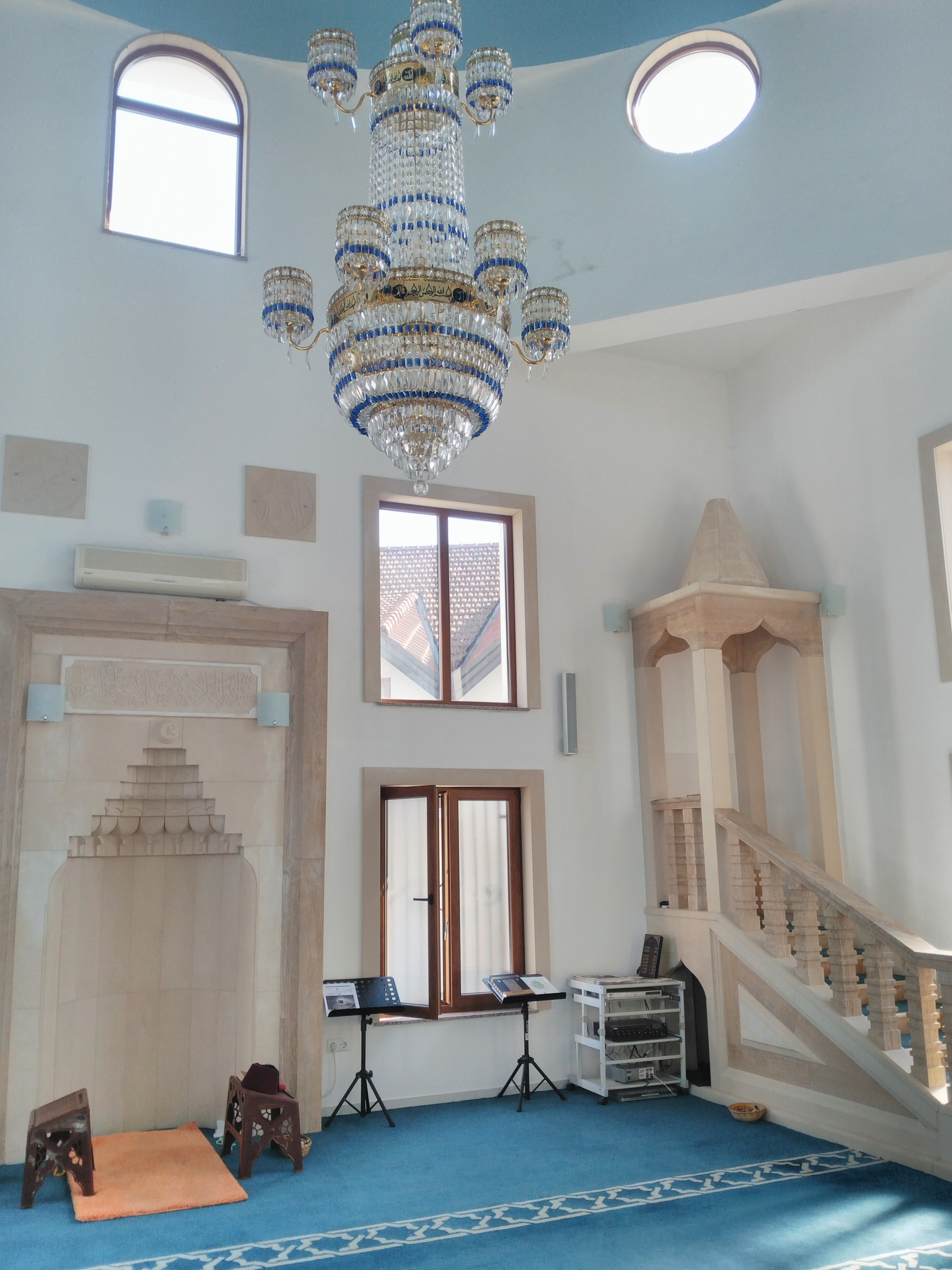
Serbian Orthodox Church of St. Nicholas in Vukovar and Gunja Mosque

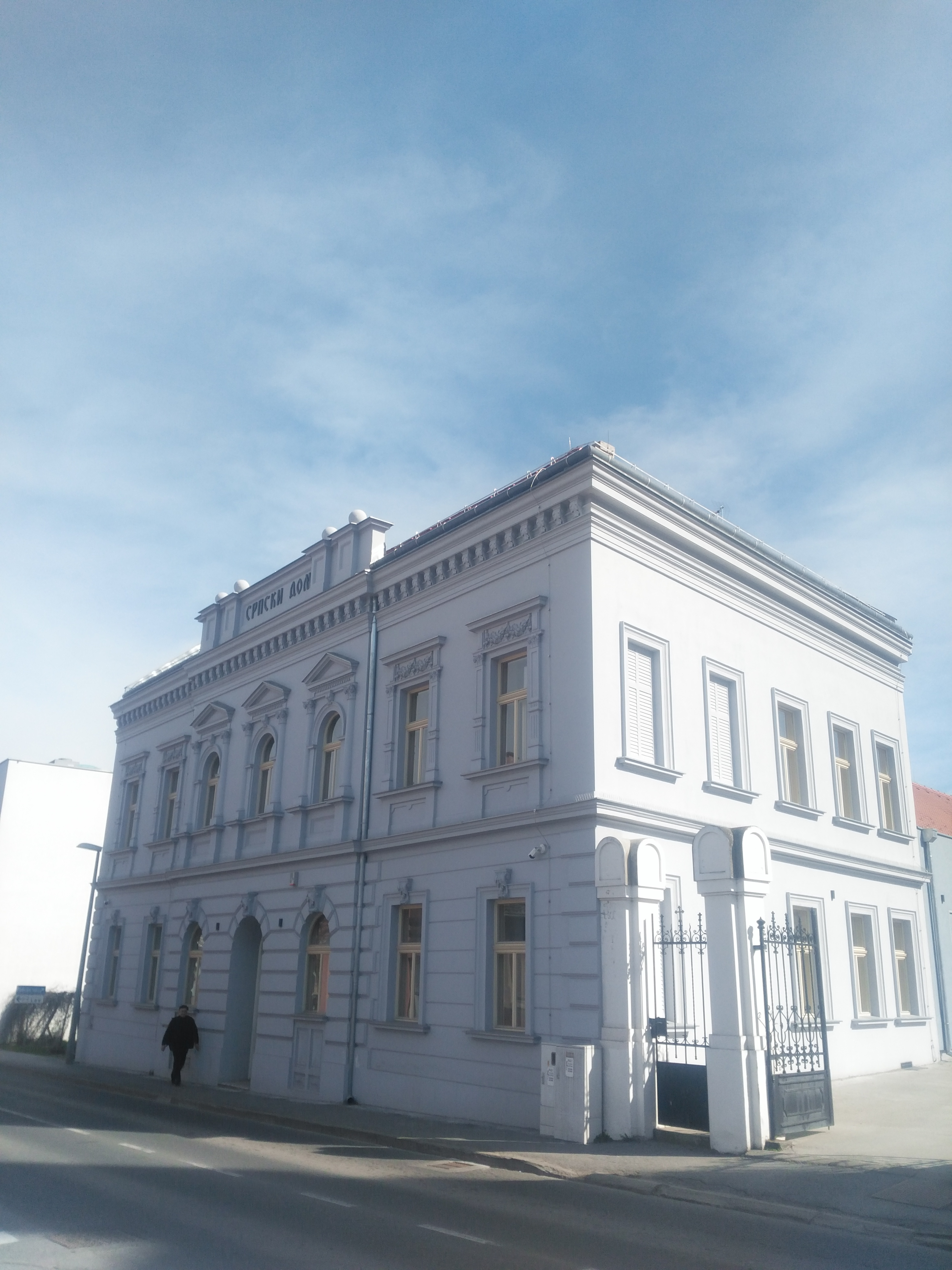
Serb home is a cultural institution of Serbs of Vukovar

Serbs form majority population in municipalities of Negoslavci (97.19%), Markušica (90.10%) (Gaboš, Karadžićevo, Ostrovo, Podrinje), Trpinja (89.75%) (Bobota, Bršadin, Pačetin, Vera, Ludvinci) and Borovo (89.73%). Outside of these municipalities Serbs form majority in villages Banovci, Vinkovački Banovci, Orolik, Srijemske Laze and Mlaka Antinska. Serbian minority communities live in Vukovar, Mirkovci, Tovarnik, Stari Jankovci, Novi Jankovci, Ilok, Bogdanovci, Tompojevci and Vinkovci.

In the town of Vukovar and municipalities of Negoslavci, Markušica, Trpinja and Borovo, as well as in the villages of Banovci and Vinkovački Banovci, Serbian language and Serbian Cyrillic script is introduced in official use alongside Croatian.

There are in total 12 elementary schools with eight additional local schools and four secondary schools offering education in Serbian. A number of Serb minority organizations are centered in the county, including the Joint Council of Municipalities, the Independent Democratic Serb Party, and Radio Borovo.

There is one elementary school in Korođ offering education in Hungarian language.

The oldest mosque in Croatia in continuous use is Gunja Mosque located in the village of Gunja.

== Politics ==
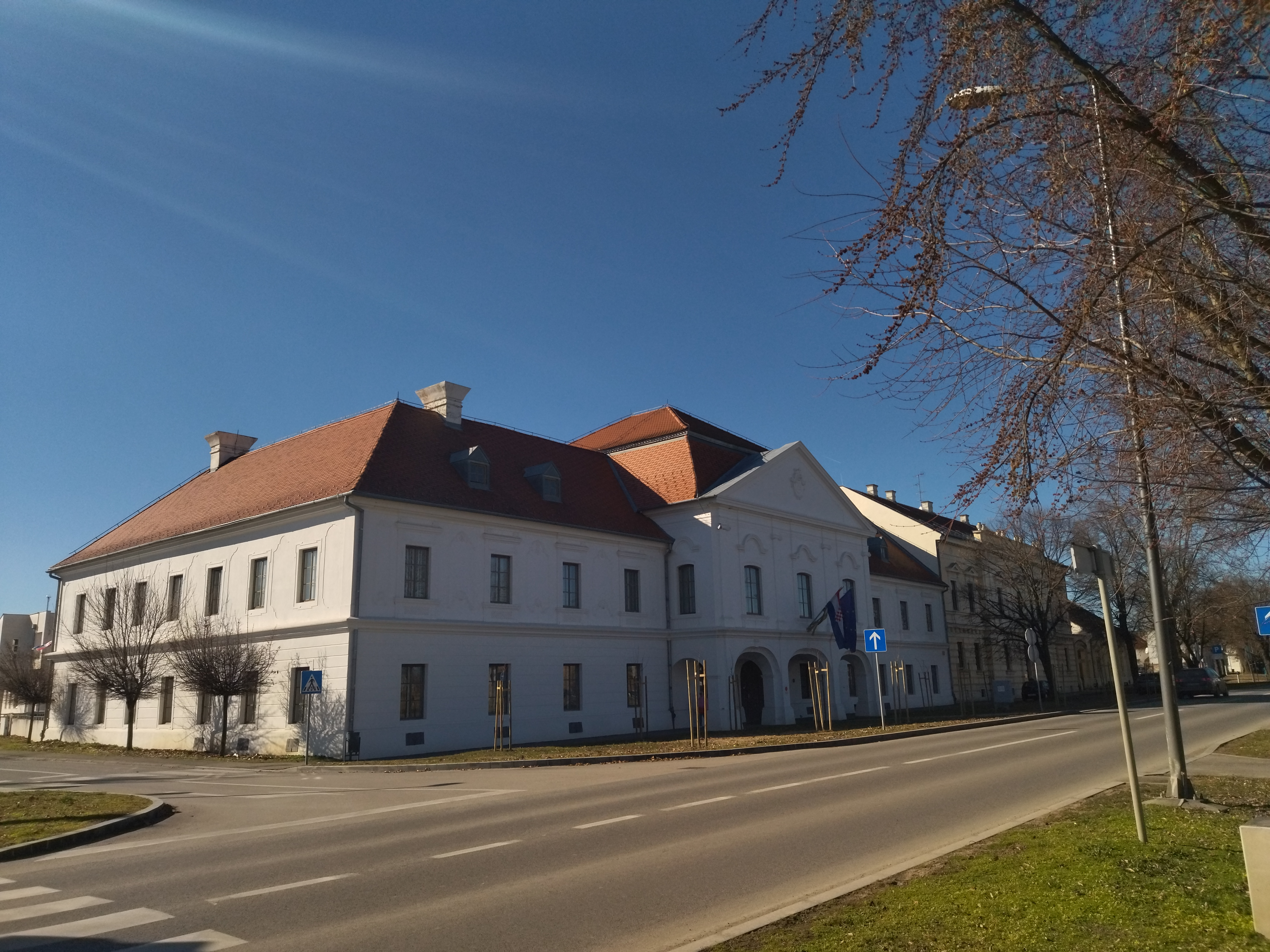
Palace of Syrmia County serves as the administrative and assembly headquarters of the county.

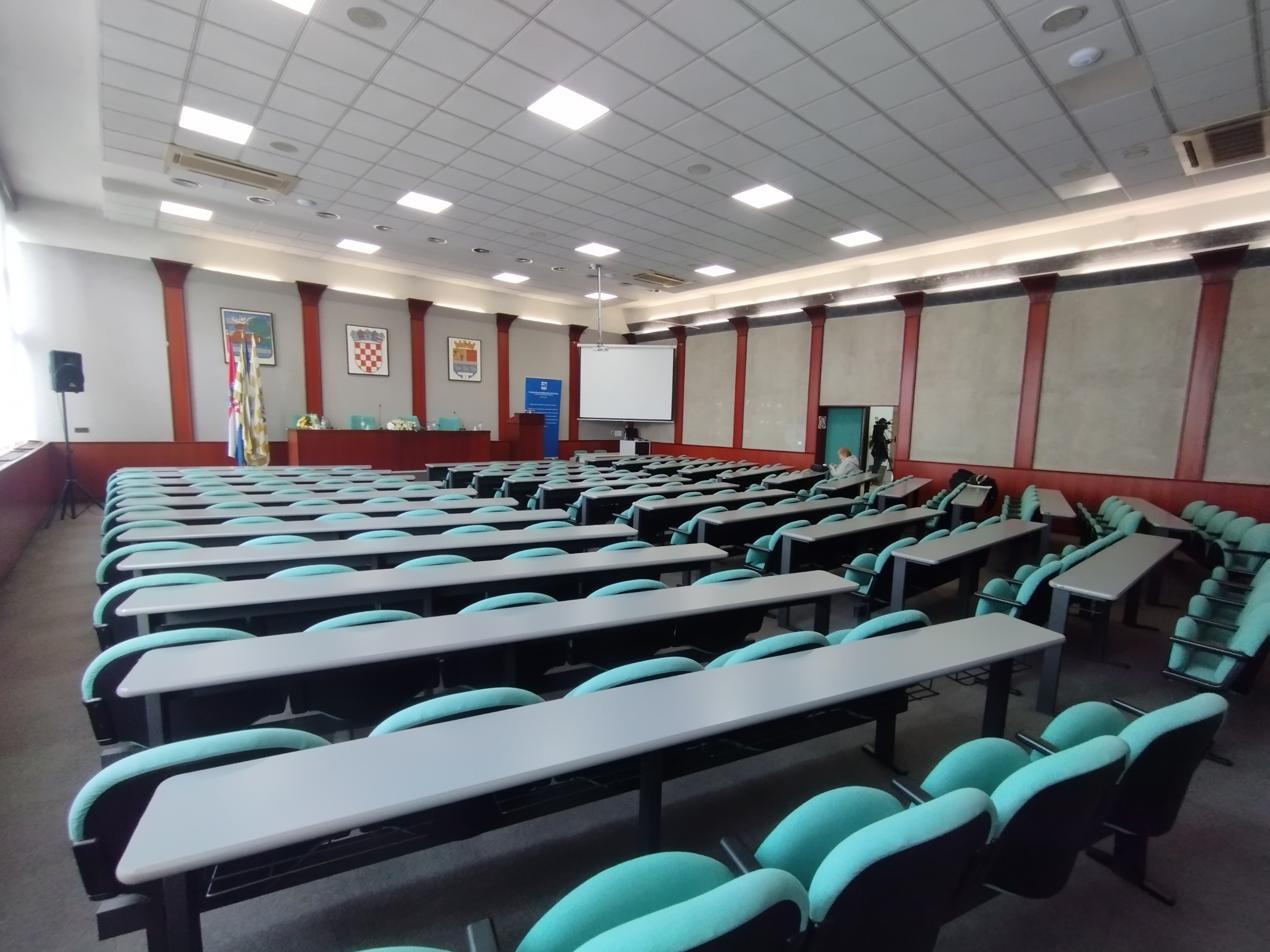
The Large Assembly Hall in Vinkovci

=== County Assembly ===
Following the 2025 Croatian local elections the Assembly of the Vukovar-Srijem County is composed of 37 elected representatives. Out of a total of 136,183 eligible voters 61,402 (45.09%) participated in the elections and 61,383 (45.07%) submitted their ballots. There were 57,679 (93.97%) valid and 3,704 (6.03%) invalid ballots. The Croatian Democratic Union got 27,158 (47.08%) ballots and 19 elected representatives, The Bridge got 9,863 ballots (17.09%) and six elected representatives, the Croatian Peasant Party and Social Democratic Party of Croatia coalition got 9,849 ballots (17.07%) and six elected representatives, the Croatian Sovereignists got 5,493 ballots (9.52%) and three elected representatives and the Independent Democratic Serb Party got 5,316 ballots (9.21%) and three elected representatives.

In accordance with the Constitutional Act on the Rights of National Minorities in the Republic of Croatia in counties, cities, towns, and municipalities where the regular elections resulted in the underrepresentation of national minorities or ethnic Croats, additional elections were held on 5 October 2025. As Serbs of Croatia were underrepresented in the county assembly compared to their number in county's population they elected one additional representative from the Independent Democratic Serb Party. This increased the total number of elected representative to 38.

Summary of the 2025 Croatian local elections
Party	Votes	%	Seats
Croatian Democratic Union	27,158	47.08	19
Bridge of Independent Lists	9,863	17.09	6
Croatian Peasant Party & Social Democratic Party of Croatia	9,849	17.07	6
Croatian Sovereignists	5,493	9.52	3
Independent Democratic Serb Party	5,316	9.21	3 +1 (additional elections)
Invalid/blank votes	3,704	6.03	—
Total	61,402	100	—
Registered voters/turnout	136,183	45.09	—
Source: (in Croatian)

=== Minority councils and representatives ===
Directly elected minority councils and representatives are tasked with consulting tasks for the local or regional authorities in which they are advocating for minority rights and interests, integration into public life and participation in the management of local affairs. At the 2023 Croatian national minorities councils and representatives elections Bosniaks, Hungarians, Pannonian Rusyns, Slovaks and Serbs of Croatia each fulfilled legal requirements to elect 25 members minority councils of the Vukovar-Srijem County while Albanians, Germans and Ukrainians of Croatia electing individual representatives with Roma representative remaining unelected due to the lack of candidates. Numerous municipalities, towns or cities in the county elected their own local minority councils as well.

== Towns and municipalities ==
Vukovar-Srijem County has 85 settlements, and is divided into five towns and 26 municipalities.

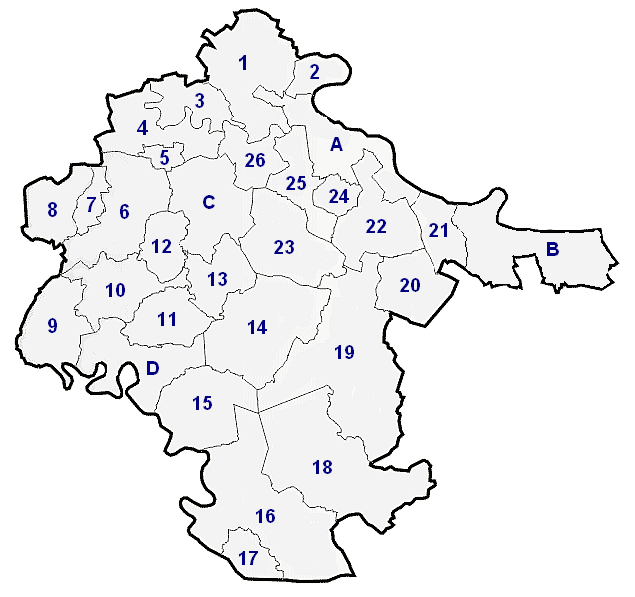
County map with municipalities

Town (bold) / Municipality	Area (km^{2})	Population (2001 census)	Population (2011 census)	Settlements (beside the seat of town/municipality)
Vukovar	98.78	31,670	28,016	Lipovača, Sotin, Grabovo
Vinkovci	94.21	35,921	35,375	Mirkovci
Županja	90.14	13,774	12,185	
Ilok	128.92	8,351	6,750	Bapska, Mohovo, Šarengrad
Otok	136.15	7,755	6,366	Komletinci
Andrijaševci	39.62	4,249	4,122	Rokovci
Babina Greda	79.51	4,262	3,585	
Bogdanovci	51.76	2,366	1,957	Petrovci, Svinjarevci
Borovo	28.13	5,360	5,133	
Bošnjaci	94.96	4,653	3,869	
Cerna	69.26	4,990	4,616	Šiškovci
Drenovci	200.02	7,424	5,109	Đurići, Posavski Podgajci, Račinovci, Rajevo Selo
Gradište	57.56	3,382	2,769	
Gunja	31.06	5,033	3,707	
Ivankovo	103.43	8,676	7,977	Prkovci, Retkovci
Jarmina	12.94	2,627	2,435	Borinci
Lovas	42.52	1,579	1,217	Opatovac
Markušica	73.44	3,053	2,576	Gaboš, Karadžićevo, Ostrovo, Podrinje
Negoslavci	21.21	1,466	1,472	
Nijemci	224.68	5,998	4,715	Apševci, Banovci, Donje Novo Selo, Đeletovci, Lipovac, Podgrađe, Vinkovački Banovci
Nuštar	43.33	5,862	5,772	Cerić, Marinci
Privlaka	52.41	3,776	2,962	
Stari Jankovci	95.16	5,216	4,404	Novi Jankovci, Orolik, Slakovci, Srijemske Laze
Stari Mikanovci	54.50	3,387	2,945	Novi Mikanovci
Štitar	40.12	2,608	2,108	
Tompojevci	72.81	1,999	1,561	Berak, Bokšić, Čakovci, Grabovo, Mikluševci
Tordinci	50.17	2,251	2,047	Antin, Korođ, Mlaka Antinska
Tovarnik	64.56	3,335	2,792	Ilača
Trpinja	123.87	6,466	5,680	Bobota, Bršadin, Ćelija, Ludvinci, Pačetin, Vera
Vođinci	21.26	2,113	1,957	
Vrbanja	191.00	5,174	3,938	Soljani, Strošinci
Total (5+26)	2,448.00	204,768	180,117	54 settlements

== See also ==
- Syrmia County of the Kingdom of Croatia-Slavonia
