= Vođinci =

Vođinci - kupusari
- Municipality
- Municipality of Vođinci; Općina Vođinci
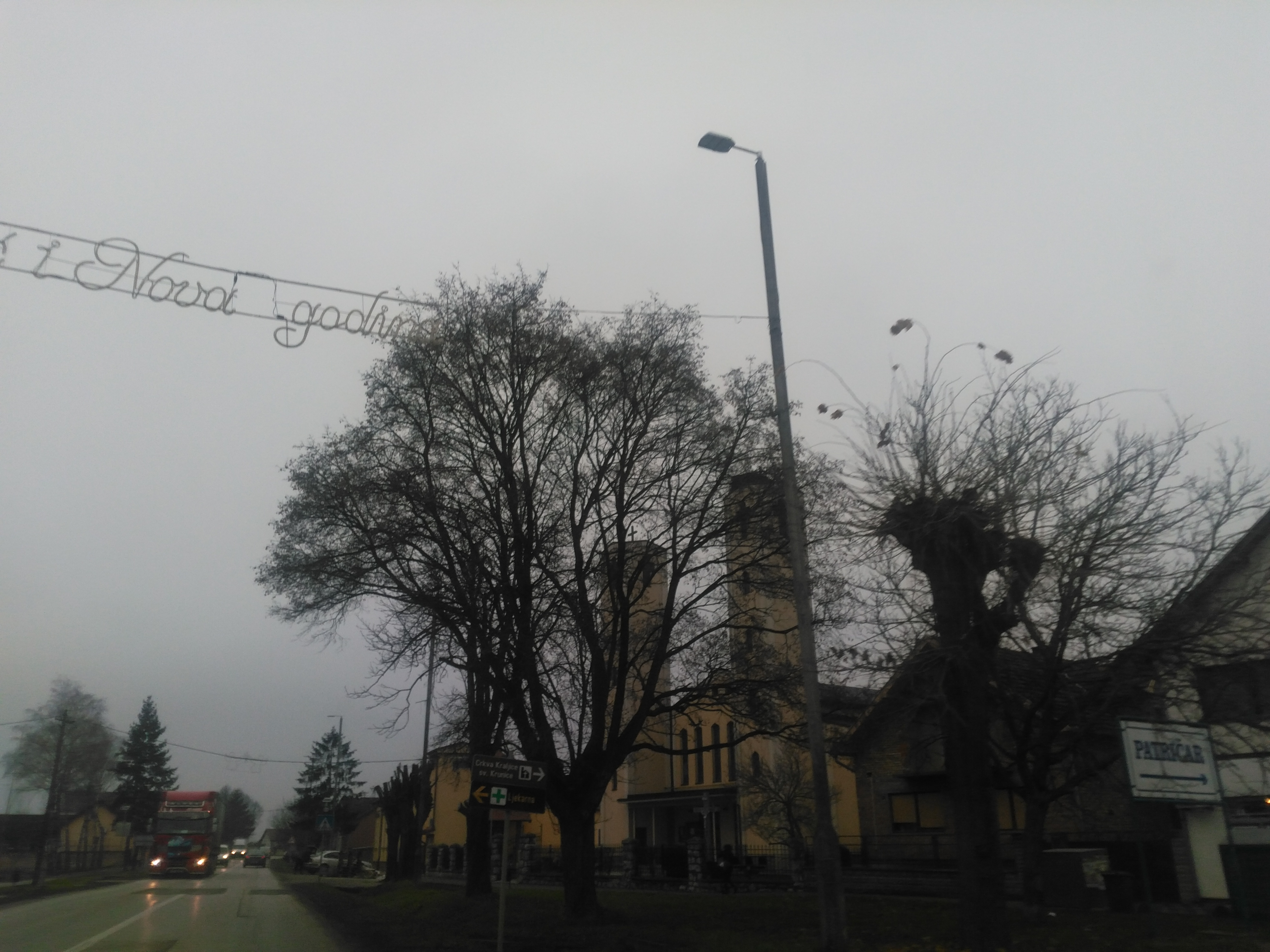
- Center of the village

- Seal

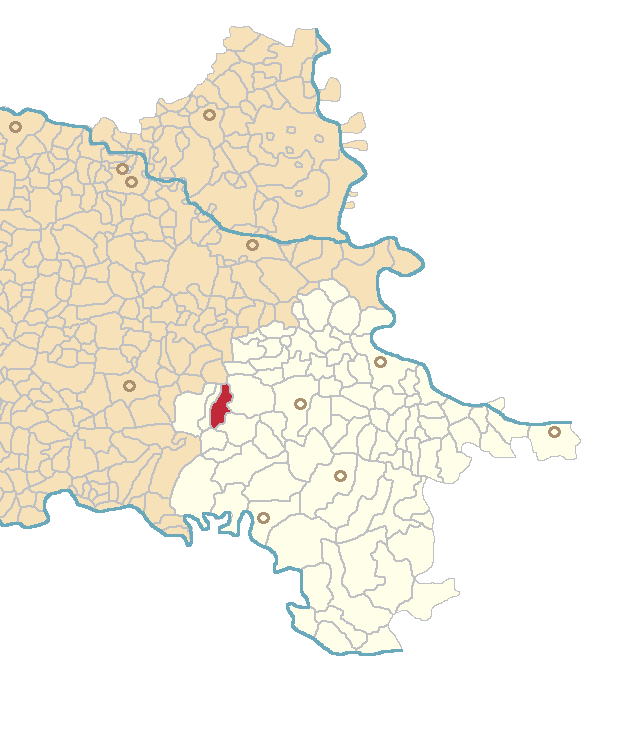

- Location in Croatia Vođinci - kupusari (Croatia) Vođinci - kupusari (Europe)
- Coordinates: 45°16′32″N 18°36′35″E
- Country: Croatia
- County: Vukovar-Syrmia County

Area
  - Municipality: 20.8 km^{2} (8.0 sq mi)
  - Urban: 20.8 km^{2} (8.0 sq mi)

Population (2021)
  - Municipality: 1,634
  - Density: 78.6/km^{2} (203/sq mi)
  - Urban: 1,634
  - Urban density: 78.6/km^{2} (203/sq mi)
- Time zone: UTC+1 (CET)
  - Summer (DST): UTC+2 (CEST)
- Postal code: ?
- Area code: 32
- Vehicle registration: VK
- Website: vodjinci.hr

Vođinci (Hungarian: Vogyince) is a municipality in the Vukovar-Syrmia County in Croatia. According to the 2001 census, there are 2,113 inhabitants, 99.72% which are Croats. With pronounced issue of population decline in eastern Croatia caused by population ageing, effects of the Croatian War of Independence and emigration after the accession of Croatia to the European Union, the population of the municipality dropped to 1,634 residents at the time of 2021 census.

== Name ==
The name of the village in Croatian is plural.
