= Ludvinci =

Ludvinci Лудвинци (Serbian)
- Village (Selo)
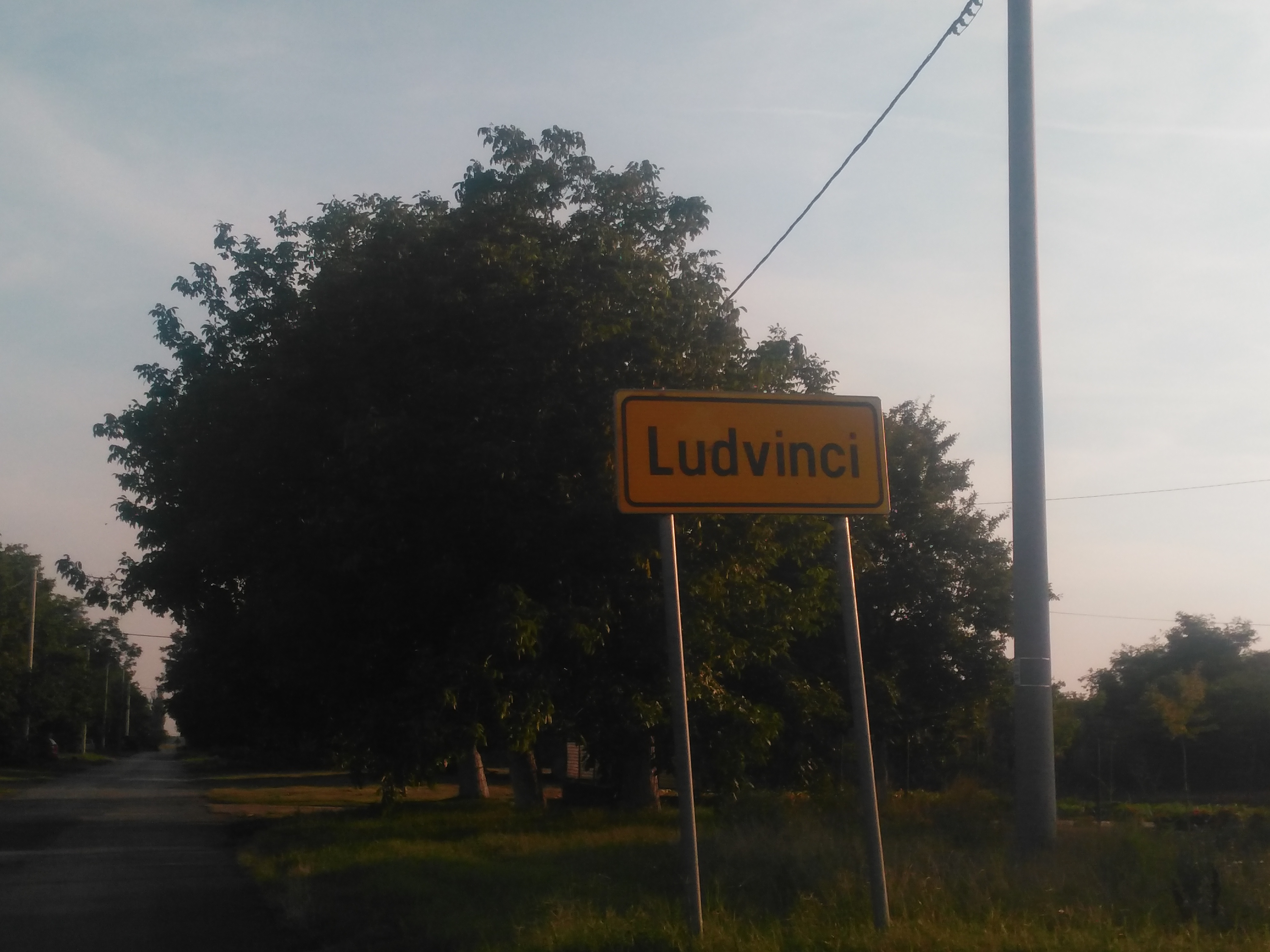
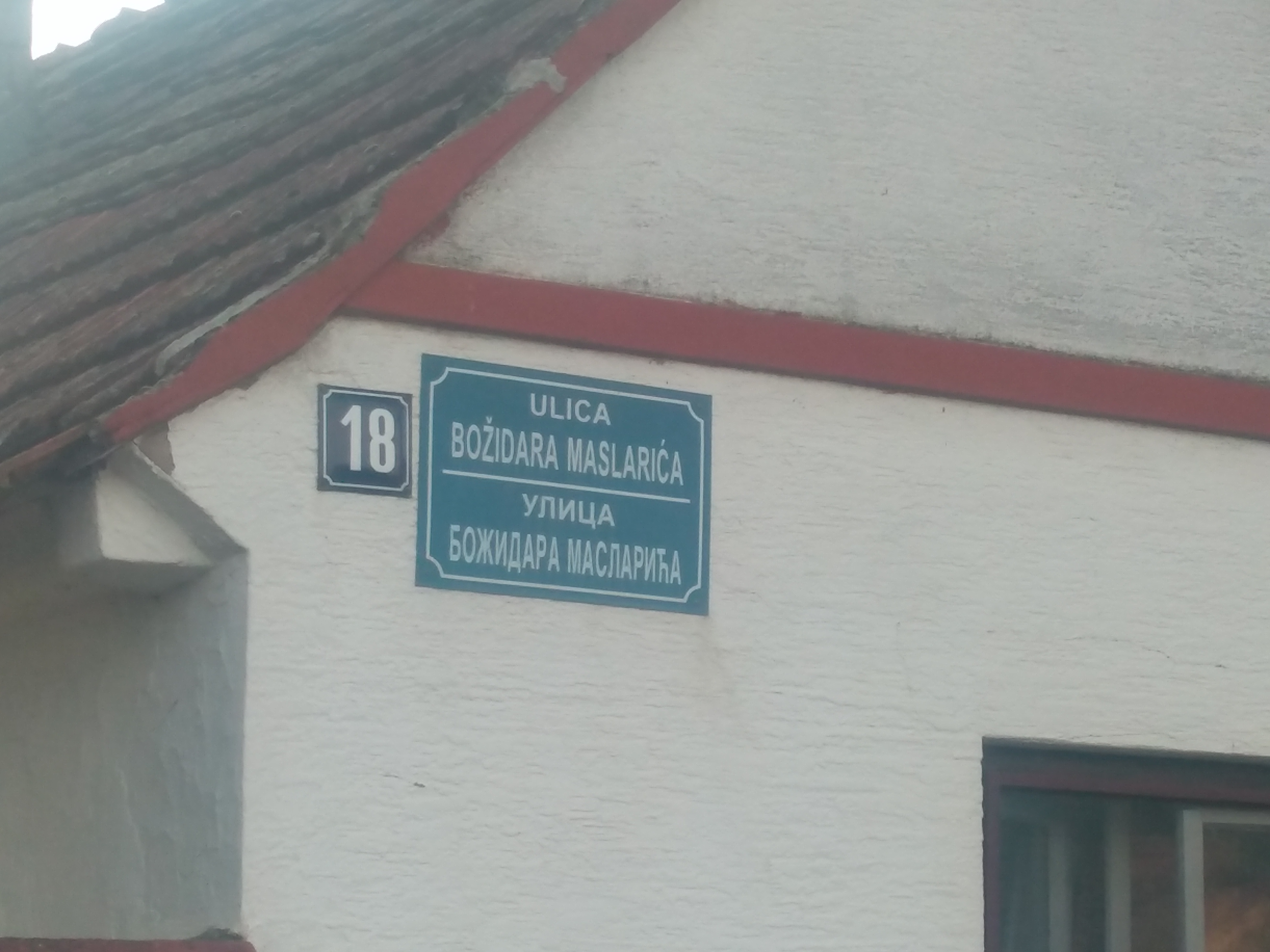
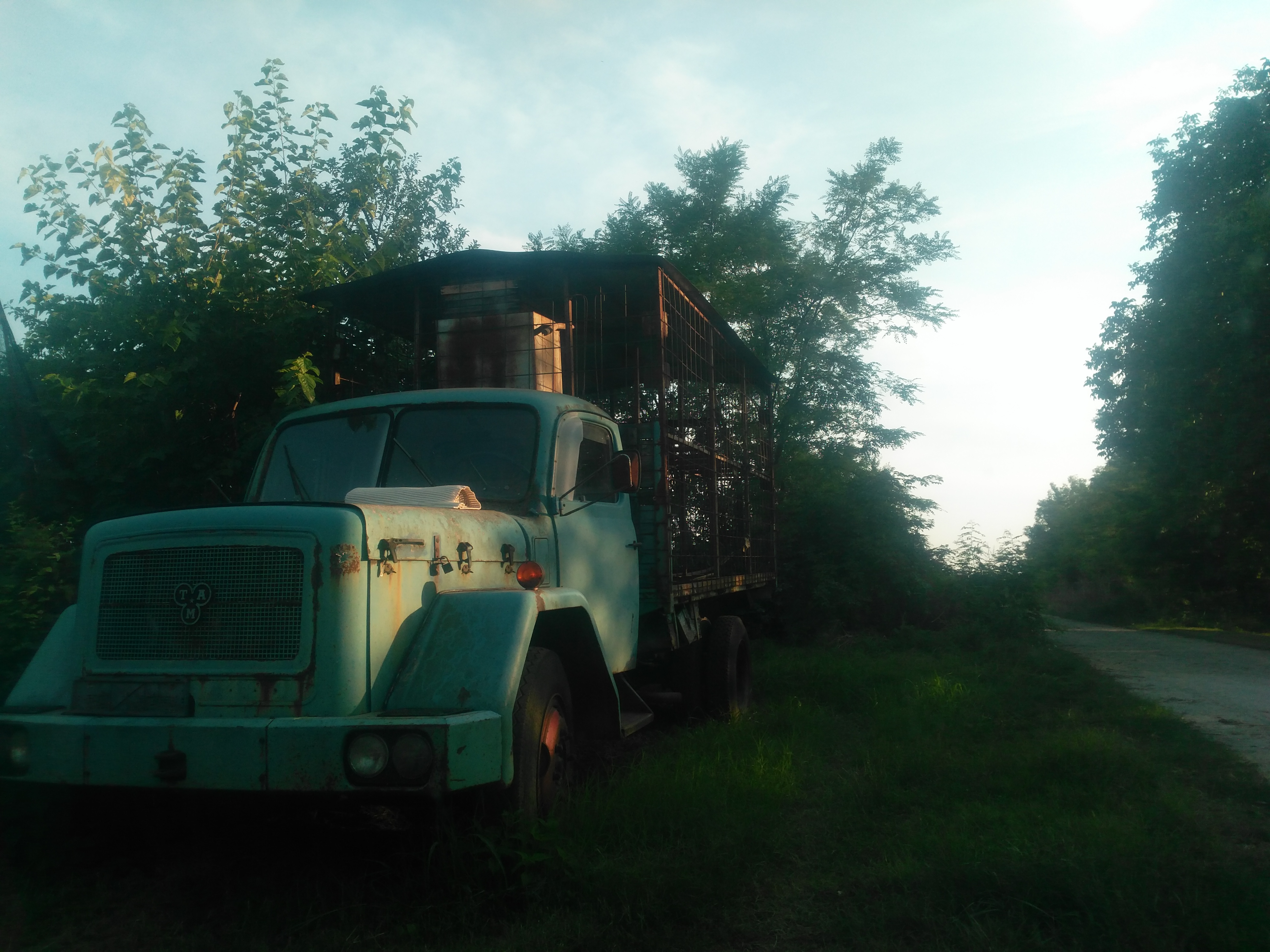
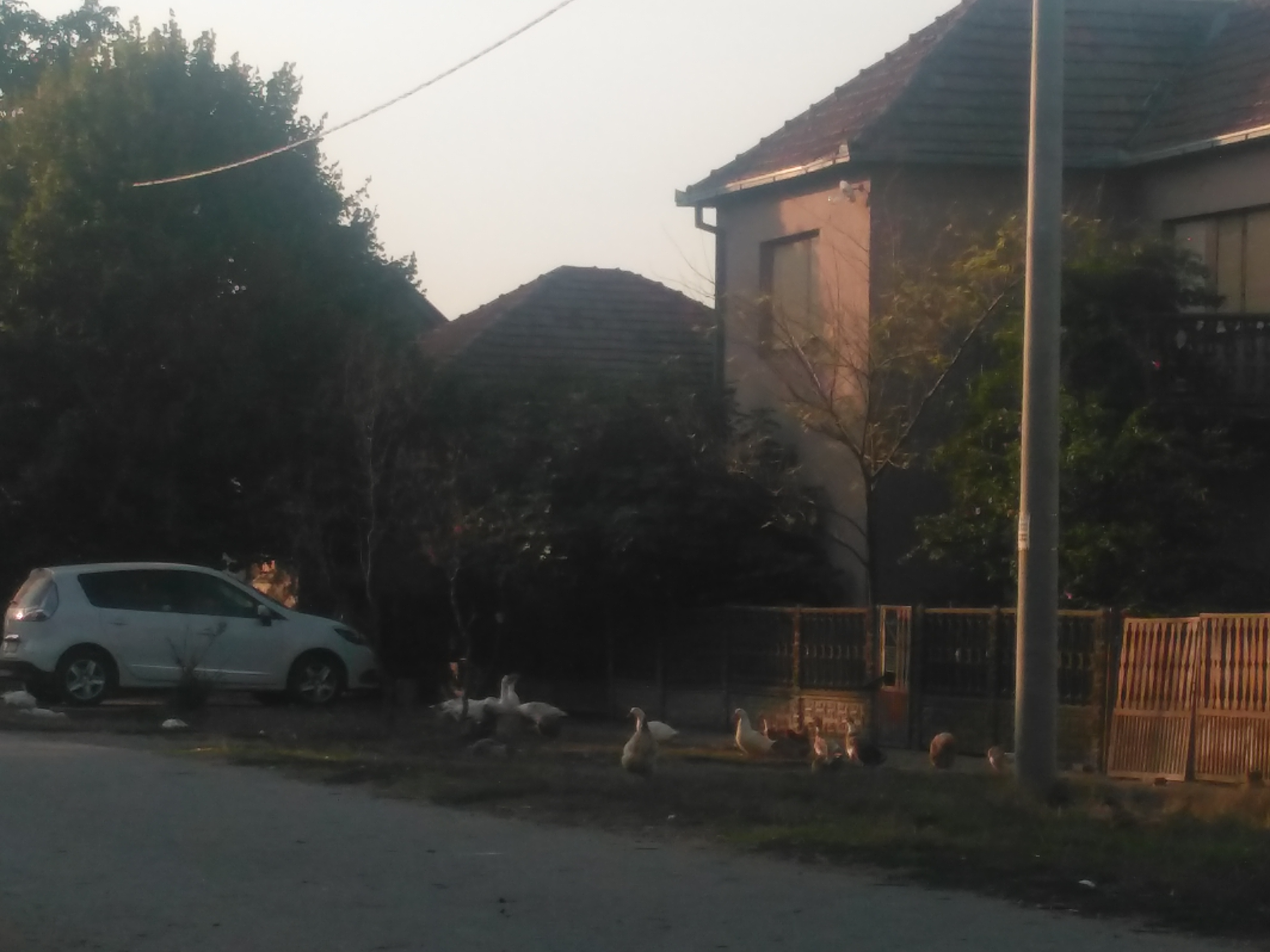

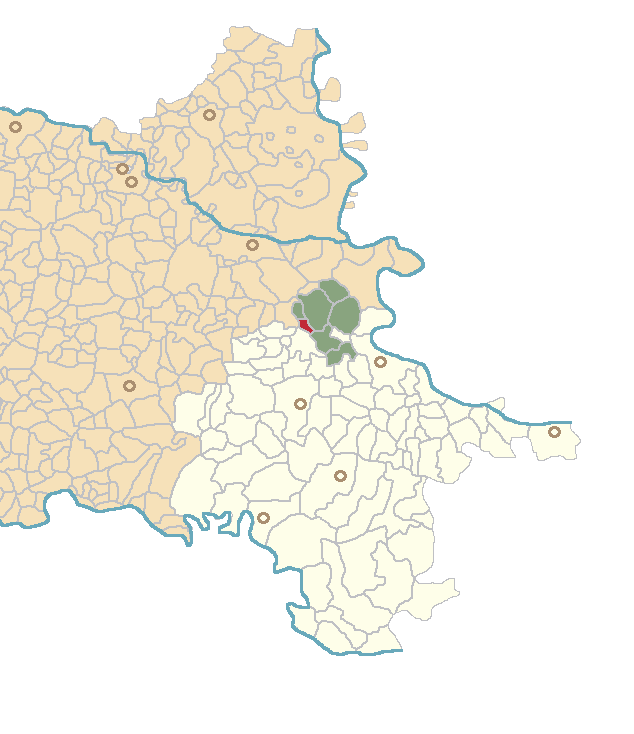
- Location of Ludvinci in Croatia

- Location within Vukovar-Syrmia County Location within Croatia Location within Europe
- Coordinates: 45°24′11″N 18°49′26″E
- Country: Croatia
- Region: Slavonia (Podunavlje)
- County: Vukovar-Syrmia
- Municipality: Trpinja

Government
  - Body: Local Committee

Area
  - Total: 4.5 km^{2} (1.7 sq mi)

Population (2021)
  - Total: 79
  - Density: 18/km^{2} (45/sq mi)
- Demonym(s): Ludvinčanin (♂) Ludvinčanka (♀) (per grammatical gender)
- Time zone: UTC+1 (CET)
  - Summer (DST): UTC+2 (CEST)
- Postal code: 32 225
- Area code: +385 (0)32
- Vehicle registration: VU
- Official languages: Croatian, Serbian

Ludvinci (Serbian Cyrillic: Лудвинци) is a village located in the municipality of Trpinja, Vukovar-Syrmia County, Croatia. The settlement was originally established as a pustara, a Pannonian type of hamlet. It was a colonist settlements established during the land reform in interwar Yugoslavia.

== Name ==
The name of the village in Croatian or Serbian is plural.

== Languages ==
=== Serbian language ===
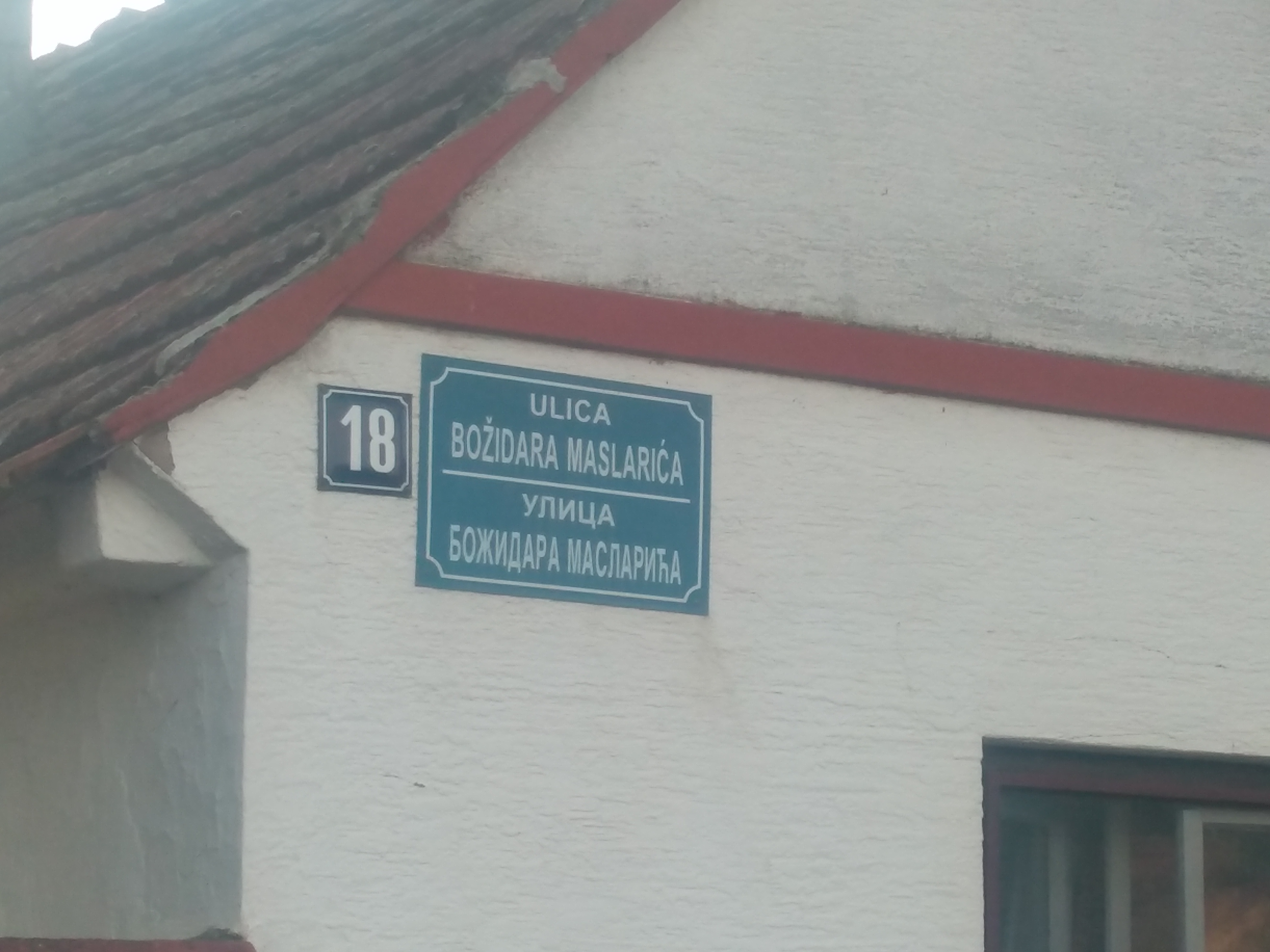
Bilingual street name.

Serbian Language and Serbian Cyrillic alphabet is the second official language in most of the villages of the Municipality of Trpinja (except Ćelije) alongside the Croatian language which is official at the national level. Both Serbian and Croatian language are standardized varieties of the pluricentric Serbo-Croatian language. According to the Municipal Statute, individuals who are members of the Serbian national minority are ensured the freedom of expression of national belonging and freedom to use their language and script in public and private use on the whole territory of the Municipality including the village of Ludvinci. The statute guarantees that the Serbian Cyrillic alphabet will be used in the same font size as the Latin alphabet in the text of the local seals and stamps, on official plates of public representatives, executive and administrative bodies, as well as on those of legal persons with public authorities.

According to the municipal Statute, bilingual signs of the same font are used for written traffic signs and other written traffic markings, street and squares names and names of settlement and geographical localities on the entire territory of the Municipality. Equal public use of Serbian language is required on the basis of the Constitutional Act on the Rights of National Minorities in the Republic of Croatia and relevant national laws and the country is a party to the European Charter for Regional or Minority Languages.

== See also ==
- Trpinja municipality
