= List of prefects of Vukovar-Srijem County =

This is a list of prefects of Vukovar-Srijem County.

== Prefects of Vukovar-Srijem County (1993–present) ==
Croatian Democratic Union (HDZ)
Croatian Peasant Party (HSS)

№	Portrait	Name (Born–Died)	Term of Office		Party
1		Matej Janković (1939–)	4 May 1993	5 January 1996	HDZ
2		Vlado Ošust (1956–)	5 January 1996	5 June 1997	HDZ
3		Rudolf König (1943–)	5 June 1997	16 June 2000	HDZ
4		Petar Čobanković (1957–)	16 June 2000	22 June 2001	HDZ
5		Nikola Šafer (1958–)	22 June 2001	9 June 2005	HSS
6		Božo Galić (1952–2026)	9 June 2005	4 June 2021	HDZ
7		Damir Dekanić (1970–)	4 June 2021	20 June 2024	HDZ
–		Franjo Orešković (Acting)	20 June 2024	9 June 2025	HDZ
8		Ivan Bosančić (1980–)	9 June 2025	Incumbent	HDZ

== See also ==
- Vukovar-Syrmia County
