= Bapska =

- Village (Selo)
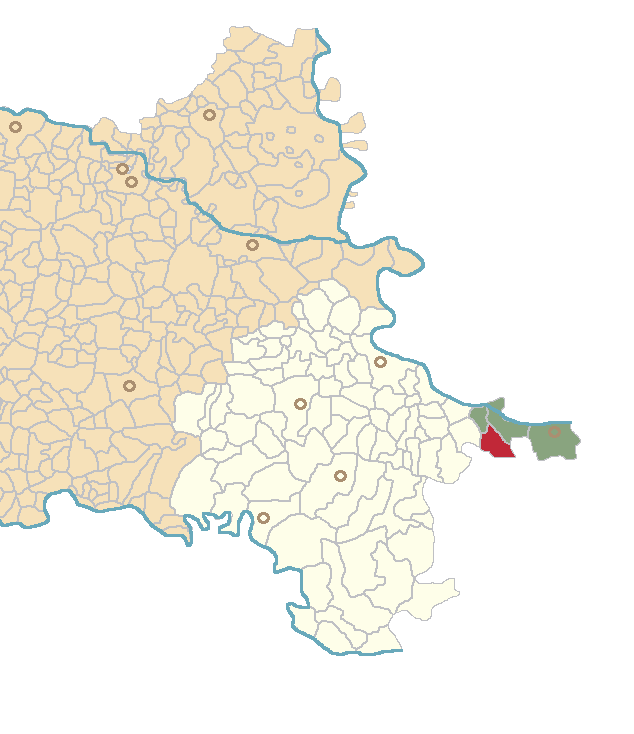
- Interactive map of Bapska
- Location within Vukovar-Syrmia County Location within Croatia Location within Europe
- Coordinates: 45°11′50″N 19°15′45″E
- Country: Croatia
- County: Vukovar-Syrmia
- Municipality: Ilok

Area
  - Total: 26.5 km^{2} (10.2 sq mi)
- Elevation: 147 m (482 ft)

Population (2021)
  - Total: 658
  - Density: 24.8/km^{2} (64.3/sq mi)
- Time zone: UTC+1 (CET)
  - Summer (DST): UTC+2 (CEST)
- Postal code: 32235 Bapska
- Area code: +385 0(32)

Bapska (Hungarian: Bábafalva, German: Bapskau) is a village in Croatia.

== Geography ==
It is located south of Šarengrad (at the D2 highway) and north of Šid, Serbia.

== History ==
In 1664 the village was raided by the Ottoman forces but was subsequently resettled. The old village of Bapska was in 1730s located about two kilometres south from the contemporary village in the location know today as the Stara Bapska (Old Bapska).

During the Croatian War of Independence the village became a part of the self proclaimed SAO Eastern Slavonia, Baranja and Western Syrmia. During the war special operations unit Crvene Beretke was stationed in the village where they often confronted local dissatisfaction and resistance due to their attitude towards civilian population.

== Demographics ==
Settlement of Bapska: Population trends 1857–2021
v

population	1090	1275	1256	1447	1504	1642	1784	1752	1769	1784	1948	1944	1699	1624	1313	928	658
	1857	1869	1880	1890	1900	1910	1921	1931	1948	1953	1961	1971	1981	1991	2001	2011	2021

Sources: Croatian Bureau of Statistics publications

=== 1991 census ===
Bapska
1991
total: 1,624
1. Croats 1,478 (91.0%)
2. Serbs 33 (2.03%)
3. Slovaks 28 (1.72%)
4. Germans 25 (1.53%)
5. Yugoslavs 16 (0.98%)
6. Hungarians 5 (0.30%)
7. Rusyns 5 (0.30%)
8. Macedonians 2 (0.12%)
9. others 1 (0.06%)
10. nondeclared 3 (0.18%)
11. regionally declared 1 (0.06%)
12. unknown 27 (1.66%)

=== 1910 census ===
According to the 1910 census, settlement of Bapska had 1,642 inhabitants (in that time in two independent settlements: Bapska with pop. of 794 and Novak with pop. of 848), which were linguistically and religiously declared as this:

Bapska
Population by language	Population by religion
total: 1,642: 1. Croatian 1,063 (64.7%); 2. German 348 (21.2%); 3. Slovak 115 (7.00%); 4. Serbian 44 (2.67%); 5. Hungarian 41 (2.49%); 6. Slovene 20 (1.21%); 7. Rusyn 9 (0.54%); 8. others 2 (0.12%)	total: 1,642: 1. Rom. Cath. 1,579 (96.2%); 2. East. Orthodox 46 (2.80%); 3. Calvinists 6 (0.36%); 4. East. Catholics 6 (0.36%); 5. Lutherans 3 (0.18%); 6. Jewish 2 (0.12%)

Note: Together with former settlement of Novak.

==== Language ====
settlement	total	Croatian	German	Slovak	Serbian	Hungarian	Slovene	Rusyn	others
Bapska	794	514	127	91	19	16	20	6	1
Novak	848	549	221	24	25	25	-	3	1

==== Religion ====
settlement	total	Rom. catholics	East. orthodox	Calvinists	East. catholics	Lutherans	Jewish
Bapska	794	765	20	5	3	1	-
Novak	848	814	26	1	3	2	2
