= Štitar, Croatia =

Štitar
- Municipality
- Municipality of Štitar; Općina Štitar
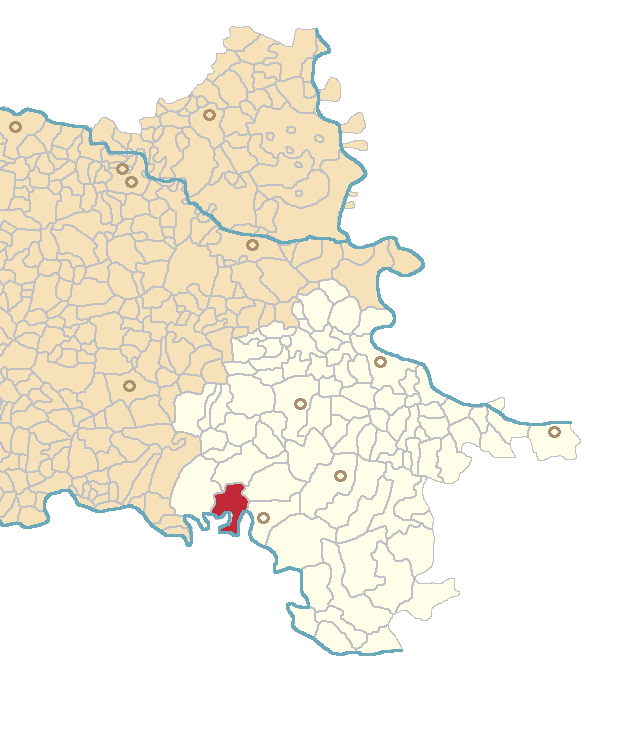
- Location of Štitar in Croatia

- Location within Vukovar-Syrmia County Location within Croatia Location within Europe
- Coordinates: 45°06′N 18°38′E
- Country: Croatia
- County: Vukovar-Syrmia County

Area
  - Municipality: 40.4 km^{2} (15.6 sq mi)
  - Urban: 40.4 km^{2} (15.6 sq mi)

Population (2021)
  - Municipality: 1,552
  - Density: 38.4/km^{2} (99.5/sq mi)
  - Urban: 1,552
  - Urban density: 38.4/km^{2} (99.5/sq mi)
- Time zone: UTC+1 (CET)
  - Summer (DST): UTC+2 (CEST)
- Postal code: 32274 Štitar
- Area code: 32
- Website: opcina-stitar.hr

Štitar (Hungarian: Csitár) is a village and municipality in the Vukovar-Syrmia County in Croatia. According to the 2011 census it has 2,129 inhabitants.
