= Palace of Syrmia County =

Municipal building in Croatia

- Palača Srijemske županije
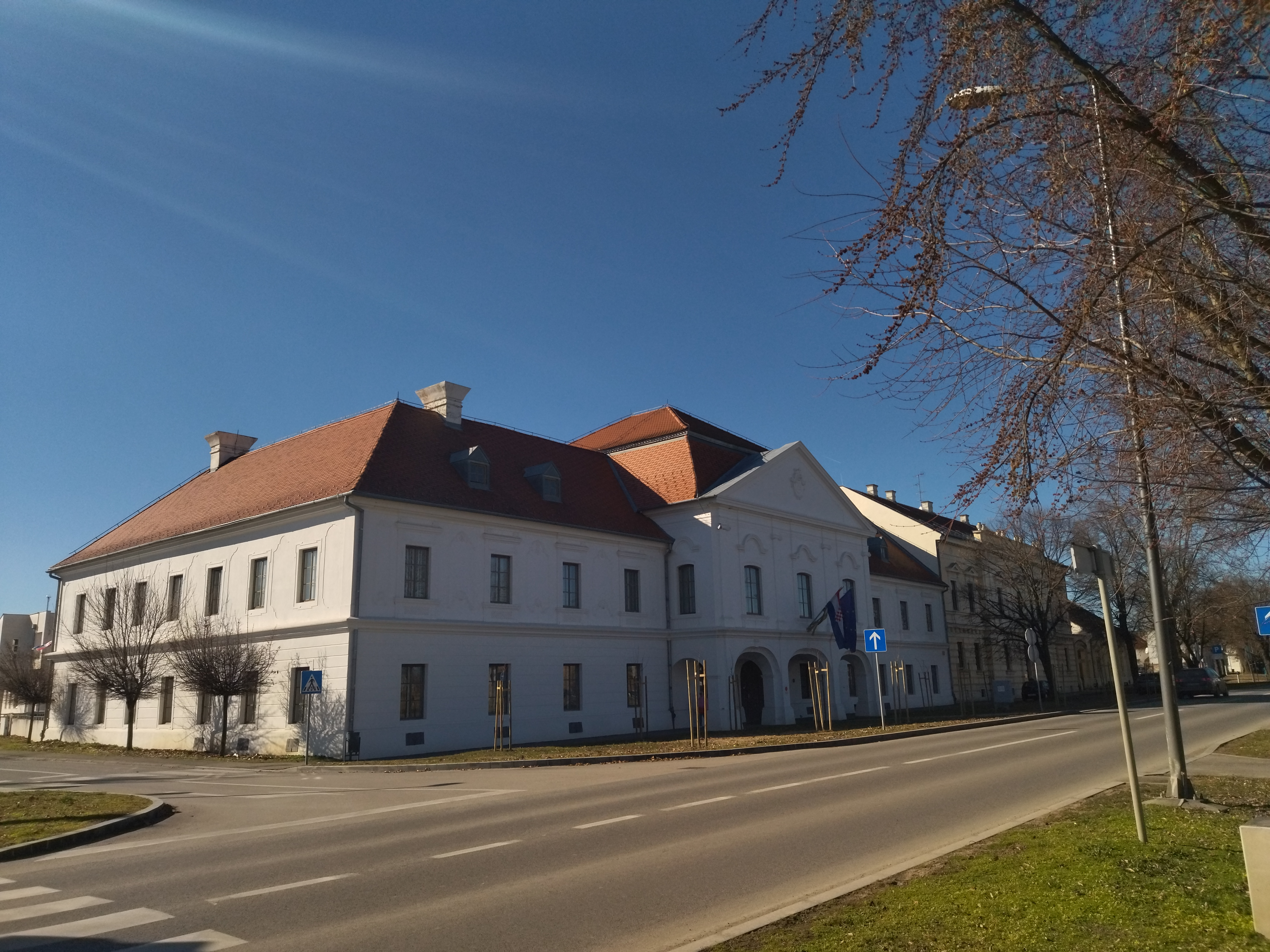
- Palace of Syrmia County (2022)
- Interactive map of the Palace of Syrmia County area

General information
- Architectural style: Baroque
- Location: Vukovar, Croatia, 32000 Vukovar
- Coordinates: 45.3556°N 18.9983°E
- Current tenants: Vukovar-Srijem County
- Completed: 1773

Palace of Syrmia County (Croatian: Palača Srijemske županije, Serbian: Палата Сремске жупаније, German: Palast der Gespanschaft Syrmien, Hungarian: Syrmia megyei palota) is located in Vukovar, the administrative seat of the Vukovar-Srijem County. The building originally housed the assembly and institutions of the Syrmia County with subsequent occupants listing various historical administrative units and including contemporary regional authorities of the Vukovar-Srijem County.

The initiative for the construction of the new palace for Syrmia County came from count Marko Pejačević who fulfilled his service from the old administrative building which was located in the courtyard of the contemporary palace. The instruction to build the palace was sent by Maria Theresa on 25 April 1768 with co-signatures from Hungarian noble and politician Ferenc Esterházy and Josip Jablanzy. General Congregation in Ilok in 1769 allocated 15,000 forints to Joseph Hatzinger who was tasked to build the new palace.

The building was fully completed and operational by 1773 and it was used for administrative purposes even before that time as early as 1771. Following the end of the Croatian War of Independence and UNTAES mission in the region the building was reconstructed by the donation of the Split-Dalmatia County.

== See also ==
- Eltz Manor
- County Palace, Osijek
