= Borinci =

- Location within Croatia
- Coordinates: 45°19′N 18°44′E
- Country: Croatia
- County: Vukovar-Syrmia
- Town: Vinkovci

Population
  - Total: Not included in census
- Time zone: UTC+1 (CET)
  - Summer (DST): UTC+2 (CEST)
- Postal code: 32280
- Area code: 32
- Vehicle registration: VK

Borinci is a hamlet in Vukovar-Syrmia County, Croatia. It is administratively located in the town of Vinkovci as a part of the settlement of Vinkovci itself.

== Name ==
The name of the village in Croatian is plural.

== Tower ==
Near Borinci, there is a 171m tall guyed mast for FM-/TV-broadcasting.
