= Germans of Croatia =

Ethnic group

German: Kroatiendeutsche; Croatian: hrvatski Nijemci

Total population
- 2,965

Languages
- Croatian; German

Religion
- Roman Catholicism

Related ethnic groups
- Germans; Austrians of Croatia; Danube Swabians

Germans of Croatia (German: Deutsche in Kroatien; Croatian: Nijemci u Hrvatskoj) or Croatian Germans (German: Kroatiendeutsche; Croatian: hrvatski Nijemci) are citizens of Croatia with partial or full German ancestry. In Croatia, there are over 2,900 people who consider themselves German, most of these Danube Swabians. Germans are officially recognized as an autochthonous national minority, and as such, they elect a special representative to the Croatian Parliament, shared with members of eleven other national minorities. They are mainly concentrated in the area around Osijek (German: Esseg) in eastern Slavonia.

== Ethnology ==
The community traditionally inhabited northern Croatia and Slavonia. In the Early modern period they had settled from other territories in the Habsburg monarchy, and in what is today Croatia mainly settled territories of the Military Frontier. The Danube Swabians that inhabited Western Slavonia were subject to strong Croatization. The Croatian intelligentsia only acknowledged a German minority in 1865.

== History ==
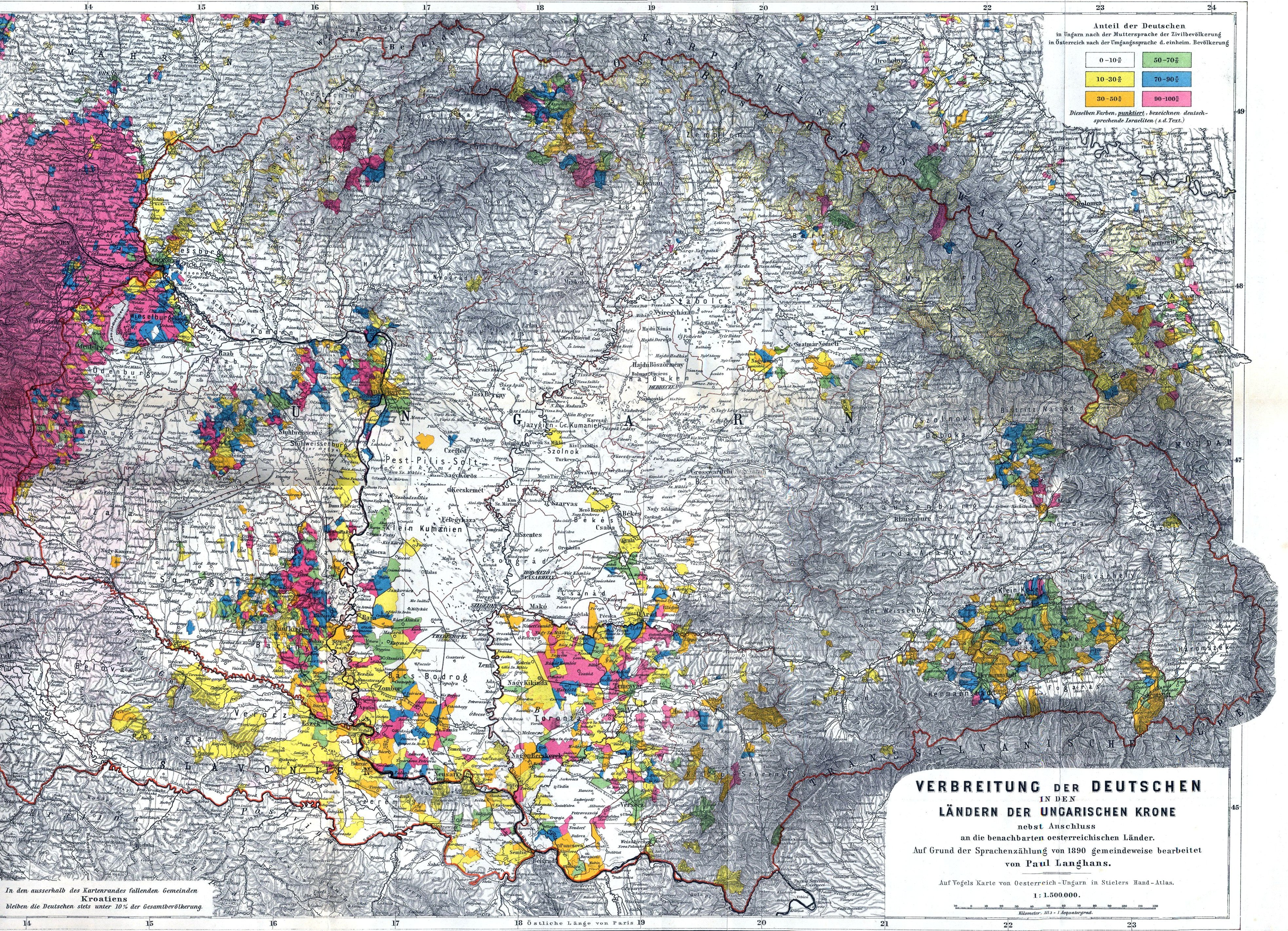
Ethnic Germans in Austro-Hungarian lands, 1890 census

With the dissolution of the Austro-Hungarian Empire and the establishment of the Kingdom of Serbs, Croats and Slovenes, the Germans of Croatia became a minority. In 1920, Germans established the cultural association Kulturbund. The Kulturbund was banned on April 11, 1924, by Minister of the Interior Svetozar Pribićević. The following government of Ljuba Davidović and the Democratic Party saw the ban lifted.

In 1922, they formed the German Party (Partei der Deutschen). The party existed until it was banned as part of King Alexander's dictatorship in 1929.

The Croatian German population reached 85,781 in the 1900 census, while this number plummeted after the German exodus in the aftermath of World War II. The Austro-Hungarian census of 1910 recorded 134,000 Germans. After World War II, 100,000 Yugoslav Germans fled to Austria. This population was not dealt with in the Potsdam Agreement which prevented them from being repatriated to Germany. The Allies considered them Yugoslavian citizens and sought their repatriation there. However, on June 4 the Communist Party of Yugoslavia released a decree that rescinded the citizenship of Yugoslavian Germans. Their property was henceforth confiscated, and the majority settled in Germany and Austria. Some managed to return to Yugoslavia and returned to their homes.

The historically predominantly German town of Čeminac built the parish Church of Sacred Heart of Christ in 1906–1907. The German population in the town was forced to leave in 1945. After democratic changes in Croatia in 1990, former inhabitants of the town, mostly living in Germany, repaired the church. However, on April 10, 1992, the church was burnt by Serb forces as part of the Croatian War of Independence. In 2001, various levels of the Croatian government contributed to its repairs, which were carried out by 2005.

In 1996, Croatia and Germany signed an agreement to facilitate the marking of German graves from the World Wars in Croatia. There are German military cemeteries in Pula, Split and Zagreb. In 2005, the Croatian government passed a comprehensive law on the return of nationalized Austrian property to its rightful owners.

== Demographics ==
According to the 2011 Croatian census, there are 2,965 Germans in Croatia.

| County | Number of Germans | Percent of total |
|---|---|---|
| Osijek-Baranja | 813 | 27.4% |
| City of Zagreb | 364 | 12.3% |
| Primorje-Gorski Kotar | 237 | 8.0% |
| Istria | 226 | 7.6% |
| Split-Dalmatia | 220 | 7.4% |
| Zadar | 176 | 5.9% |
| Vukovar-Syrmia | 137 | 4.6% |
| Zagreb | 109 | 3.7% |

== Geography ==
The main villages and towns in Slavonia where ethnic Germans had originally settled include:

- Darda (Darda)
- Jagodnjak (Katschfeld)
- Josipovac-Kravice (Oberjosefsdorf-Krawitz)
- Kula (Kula-Josefsfeld)
- Osijek (Esseg)
- Sarvaš (Sarwasch-Hirschfeld)
- Satnica Đakovačka (Satnitz)
- Slavonski Brod (Brood)
- Harkanovci (Kawinz)

There were many German settlements in the adjacent region of Syrmia (Symrien); there is still a village called Nijemci which literally translates to "Germans". The main locations in the Croatian part of Syrmia formerly settled by Germans include:

- Vukovar (Wukowar)
- Novo Selo (Neudorf), now the western part of Vinkovci
- Opatovac (Sankt Lorenz)
- Lovas (Lowas)
- Jarmina (Jahrmein)
- Berak
- Tompojevci
- Tovarnik (Sankt Georg)
- Ilača (Illatsch)
- Svinjarevci
- Bapska (Babska)
- Orolik
- Banovci
- Novi Jankovci (Neu-Jankowzi)
- Ernestinovo (Ernestinenhof)

German settlements in Western Slavonia:

- Hrastovac (Eichendorf)
- Blagorodovac (Blagorodowatz)
- Filipovac
- Antunovac
- Dobrovac
- Mali Bastaji
- Veliki Miletinac
- Đulovac (Wercke)
- Novo Zvečevo (Papuck)

== Culture ==
=== Organizations ===
The Germans and Austrians have created the Society of Germans and Austrians of Croatia. There is a German culture centre in Osijek, and a small number of German schools in the area.

Since the fall of communism and Croatian independence, the minority has held an annual academic conference titled Germans and Austrians in the Croatian cultural circle.

== Anthropology ==
=== Surnames ===
Examples of Croatianized Germanic surnames in Croatia include Ajhner (Eichner), Bahman (Bachmann), Birer (Bührer), Ceglec (Ziegler), Cukerić (Zucker), Flajs (Fleiss), Fresel (Fressl), Goldštajn (Goldstein), Gotvald (Gottwald), Helfrich (Helfricht), Hohšteter (Hochstädter), Kunštek (Kunst), Majer, Majerić, Majerović (from Mayer/Meyer/Meier), Šmit (Schmidt), Šnidarić, Šnidaršić (Schneider), Špic (Spitz), Špicmiler (Spitzmüller), Šturmer (Stürmer), Šuflaj (Schufflei), Šuper (Schupper), Švarc (Schwarz), Tabajner (Tappeiner), Tišlarić (Tischler), Tunkel (Dunkel), Vinšer (Wünscher), Vitman (Wittman), etc. Among surnames that have retained their original form, Mayer/Meyer, Schmidt, Hermann, Bauer, Wolf, Fischer, Schneider, Schwarz, Richter, Müller, Zimmermann, Wagner, are examples of those found in greater numbers.

== Notable people ==
- Ljudevit Gaj (1809–1872), linguist, from Krapina-Zagorje
- Adolfo Veber Tkalčević (1825–1889), philologist, Moravian German father
- Josip Stadler (1843–1918), Catholic archbishop, from Slavonski Brod
- Ivan Merz (1896–1928), Catholic lay academic and saint, from Banja Luka
- Pavao Štoos (1806–1862), Catholic priest and poet, from Zagreb
- Anton Geiser (1924–2012), Nazi, from Đakovo
- Rikard Jorgovanić (1853–1880), writer, from Krapina-Zagorje, Bohemian German father
- Vjekoslav Klaić (1849–1928), historian, from Slavonski Brod, German mother
- Pavao Ritter Vitezović (1652–1713), writer and diplomat, German father
- Velimir Neidhardt (born 1943), architect, from Zagreb
- Franjo Maixner (1841–1903), academic and professor, from Osijek
- Ferdinand Kulmer (1925–1998), painter, from Zagreb
- Ljudevit Jonke (1907–1979), linguist, from Karlovac
- Josip Hamm (1905–1986), Slavist, from Osijek-Baranja
- Željko Reiner (born 1953), politician, from Zagreb
- Josip Schlosser (1801–1882), physician
- Josip Seissel (1904–1987), architect, from Krapina-Zagorje
- Josip Juraj Strossmayer (1815-1905), politician, Roman Catholic bishop, and benefactor, from Osijek
- Ante Šercer (1896–1968), physician, from Požega
- Ivo Šlaus (born 1931), physicist, from Split
- Rajko Grlić (born 1947), film director from Zagreb
- Branko Schmidt (born 1957), film director from Osijek
- Radovan Fuchs (born 1953), scientist and politician serving as Minister of Science and Education in the Government of Croatia since 2020
- Željko Koenigsknecht (born 1961), film actor from Vukovar
- Inge Appelt (born 1943), actress

== See also ==
- Croatia–Germany relations
- Croats in Germany
- Volksdeutsche
- Wehrbauer
- Valpovo work camp
- Ernst Thälmann Company

== Sources ==
- Oberkersch, Valentin (2006). Danube Swabians... DVHH.
- Geiger, V. (1991). "Nijemci u Hrvatskoj". Migracijske i etničke teme. 7 (3–4): 319–334.
- Geiger, V. (2001). "Nijemci u Đakovu i Đakovštini". Scrinia Slavonica. 2 (1). Hrvatski institut za povijest: 570–572.
- Geiger, V. (2006). "Folksdojčeri u Hrvatskoj 1945". 1945.-Razdjelnica Hrvatske Povijest. Hrvatski institut za povijest: 271–287.
- Richembergh, G. B. (2010). "Nijemci, Austrijanci i Hrvati: prilozi za povijest njemačko-austrijske nacionalne manjine u Hrvatskoj i Bosni i Hercegovini". Synopsis.
- Škiljan, F. (2014). "Nacionalne manjine u hrvatskoj Baranji između čekića i nakovnja-slučaj baranjskih Nijemaca". Srpsko-hrvatski politički odnosi u 20.
- Ščukanec, A. (2010). "Njemačka prezimena u Zagrebu i okolici i načini njihova prilagođivanja hrvatskom jezičnom sustavu". Folia Onomastica Croatica. 18: 149–169.
- Geiger, V., 2008. Josip Broz Tito i sudbina jugoslavenskih Nijemaca. Časopis za suvremenu povijest, 40(3), pp. 789–818.
- Mira Kolar-Dimitrijević, Skrivene biografije nekih Nijemaca i Austrijanaca u Hrvatskoj 19. i 20. stoljeća, Osijek, 2001.
- Kolar-Dimitrijević, M., 1994. Nijemci u podravini. U: GB Richembergh (prir.), Nijemci u Hrvatskoj: Jučer i danas (Zbornik). Zagreb: Volksdeutsche Gemeinschaft, pp. 43–50.
- TRADICIJSKI ŽIVOT MAĐARA I NIJEMACA U RETFALI, DIJELU OSIJEKA; Vlasta Šabić; Muzej Slavonije, Osijek, Hrvatska str. 105-120
- Osvrt na važnije radove o Nijemcima u Požegi i Požeškoj kotlini; Vladimir Geiger str. 296-307
- Migracije njemačkog stanovništva na hrvatskom području tijekom Drugoga svjetskog rata i poraća; Marica Karakaš Obradov str. 271-294
