= Bastaji =

Bastaji may refer to:

- Bastaji, Bosnia and Herzegovina
- Veliki Bastaji, Croatia
- Mali Bastaji, Croatia
- Bastaji, Nikšić, Montenegro
