= Korenica (disambiguation) =

Korenica is a town in Croatia.

Korenica may also refer to:

- Korenica, Krivogaštani, a village in Pelagonia, North Macedonia
- Korenica (surname)

== See also ==
- Koreničani
