= Batinjani =

Batinjani may refer to:

- Batinjani, Bjelovar-Bilogora County, village in the Đulovac municipality, population 273 (as of 2001)
- Batinjani, Požega-Slavonia County, settlement near Pakrac, population 90 (as of 2001)
