= Tompojevci =

- Municipality
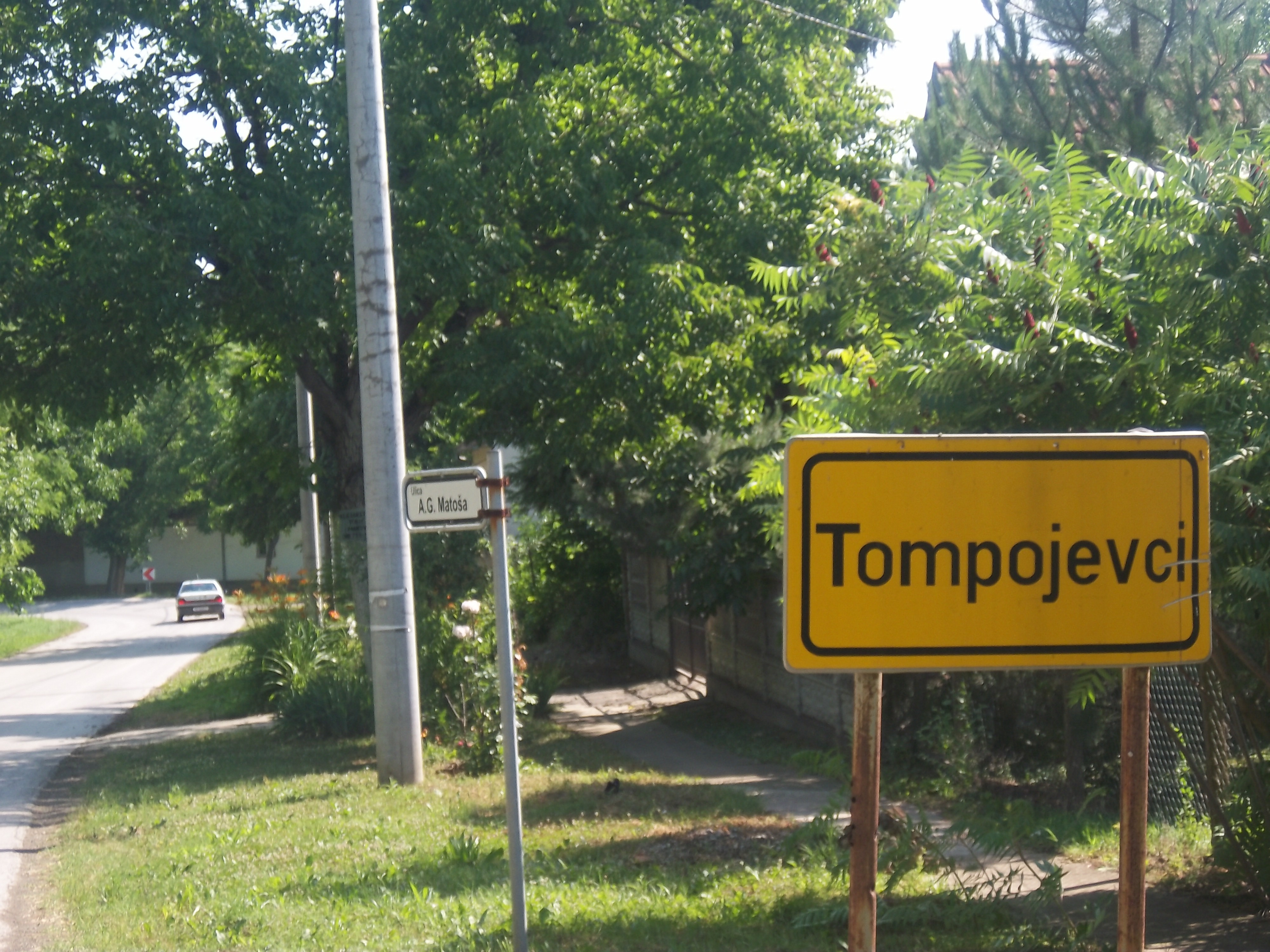

- Flag Seal

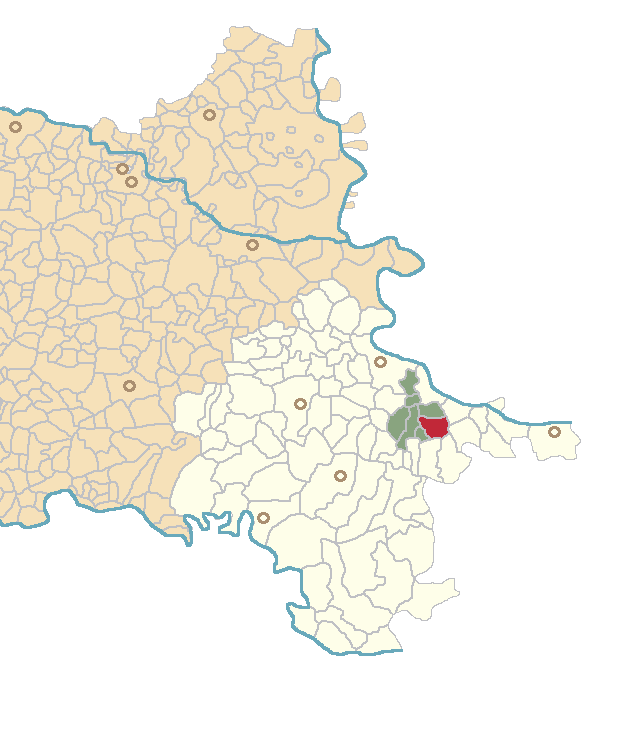

- Location in Croatia Tompojevci (Croatia) Tompojevci (Europe)
- Coordinates: 45°14′N 19°6′E
- Country: Croatia
- Region: Syrmia (Podunavlje)
- County: Vukovar-Syrmia County
- Municipal seat Largest settlement: Tompojevci Berak

Government
  - Municipal mayor: Milan Grubač (HDZ)

Area
  - Municipality: 72.4 km^{2} (28.0 sq mi)
  - Urban: 17.4 km^{2} (6.7 sq mi)

Population (2021)
  - Municipality: 1,116
  - Density: 15.4/km^{2} (39.9/sq mi)
  - Urban: 227
  - Urban density: 13.0/km^{2} (33.8/sq mi)
- Time zone: UTC+1 (CET)
  - Summer (DST): UTC+2 (CEST)
- Postal code: 32238
- Area code: 32
- Vehicle registration: VU
- Website: opcina-tompojevci.hr

Tompojevci (Hungarian: Tompojevce, Rusyn: Томпоєвци, Serbian Cyrillic: Томпојевци) is a village and municipality in the Vukovar-Syrmia County in Croatia.

The village of Tompojevci was first mentioned in the 13th century, in Hungarian documents as Tomteleke. The Croatian name of the village, Tompojevci, appears for the first time in 1581. According to the population census from 1847, Tompojevci had 501 inhabitants, 492 Catholics and 9 Orthodox.

According to the 2011 census, there are 1,565 inhabitants in the municipality. With pronounced issue of population decline in eastern Croatia caused by population ageing, effects of the Croatian War of Independence and emigration after the accession of Croatia to the European Union, the population of the municipality dropped to 1,116 residents at the time of 2021 census.

The municipality encompasses the Jelaš Forest, where a mass grave containing six bodies and three individual graves of people killed during the Croatian War of Independence were found. As of October 2013 four of the bodies remain unidentified, while the rest were Croatian National Guard soldiers and civilians. A memorial was built at the site in 2013.

Tompojevci is underdeveloped municipality which is statistically classified as the First Category Area of Special State Concern by the Government of Croatia.

== Name ==
The name of the village in Croatian is plural.

== History ==
Following Ottoman retreat from the region, the Lordship of Vukovar was established, and the village became part of its domain.

== Demographics ==
Ethnic groups in the municipality include (2011 census):

- 61.73% Croats
- 17.38% Rusyns
- 10.48% Serbs
- 9.01% Hungarians

== Inhabited places ==
Municipality contains the villages of Berak, Bokšić, Čakovci, Grabovo, Mikluševci and Tompojevci.

Settlement	Population
Berak	386
Bokšić	126
Čakovci	366
Grabovo	47
Mikluševci	375
Tompojevci	309

== Politics ==
Mayor of the municipality is Tomislav Panenić.

=== Minority councils ===
Directly elected minority councils and representatives are tasked with consulting tasks for the local or regional authorities in which they are advocating for minority rights and interests, integration into public life and participation in the management of local affairs. At the 2023 Croatian national minorities councils and representatives elections Hungarians, Pannonian Rusyns and Serbs of Croatia each fulfilled legal requirements to elect 10 members minority councils of the Tompojevci Municipality.

== Languages ==
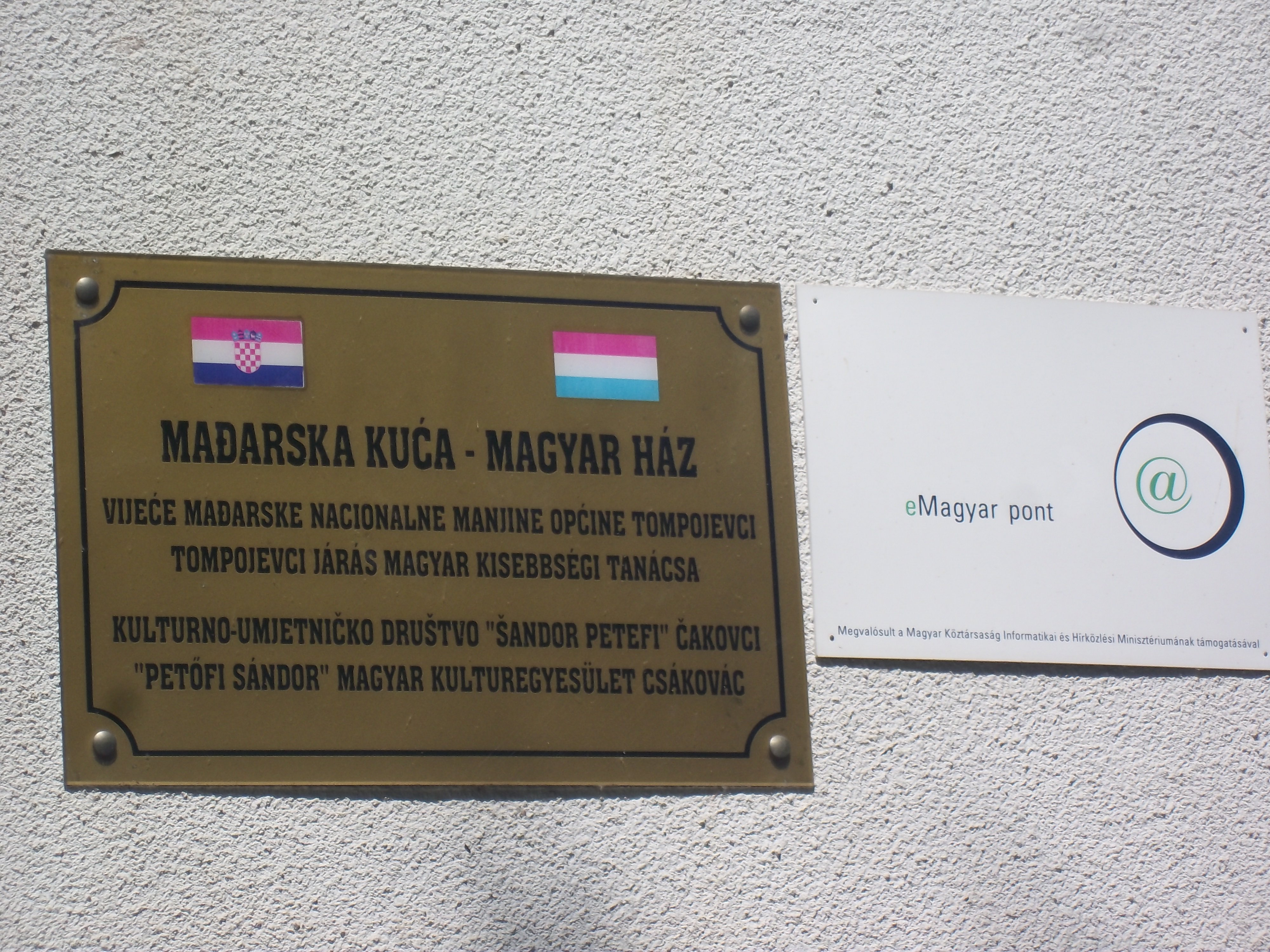
bilingual plate on Hungarian House in Čakovci

In the Municipality of Tompojevci for the territory of the settlement of Mikluševci, where Rusyns make up the majority of the population (of the total of 486 inhabitants 359 are Rusyns), equal use of the Rusyn language has been introduced by the Statute of the Municipality of Tompojevci, and for the settlement of Čakovci in the same Municipality, where Hungarians make up the majority of the population, equal use of the Hungarian language and script has been introduced.

== See also ==
- Vukovar-Syrmia County
- Syrmia
- Church of the Nativity of the Theotokos, Mikluševci
- Church of St. Nicholas, Mikluševci
- Church of the Presentation of Mary, Čakovci
