= Čakovci =

Čakovci Csákovác (Hungarian)
- Village (Selo)
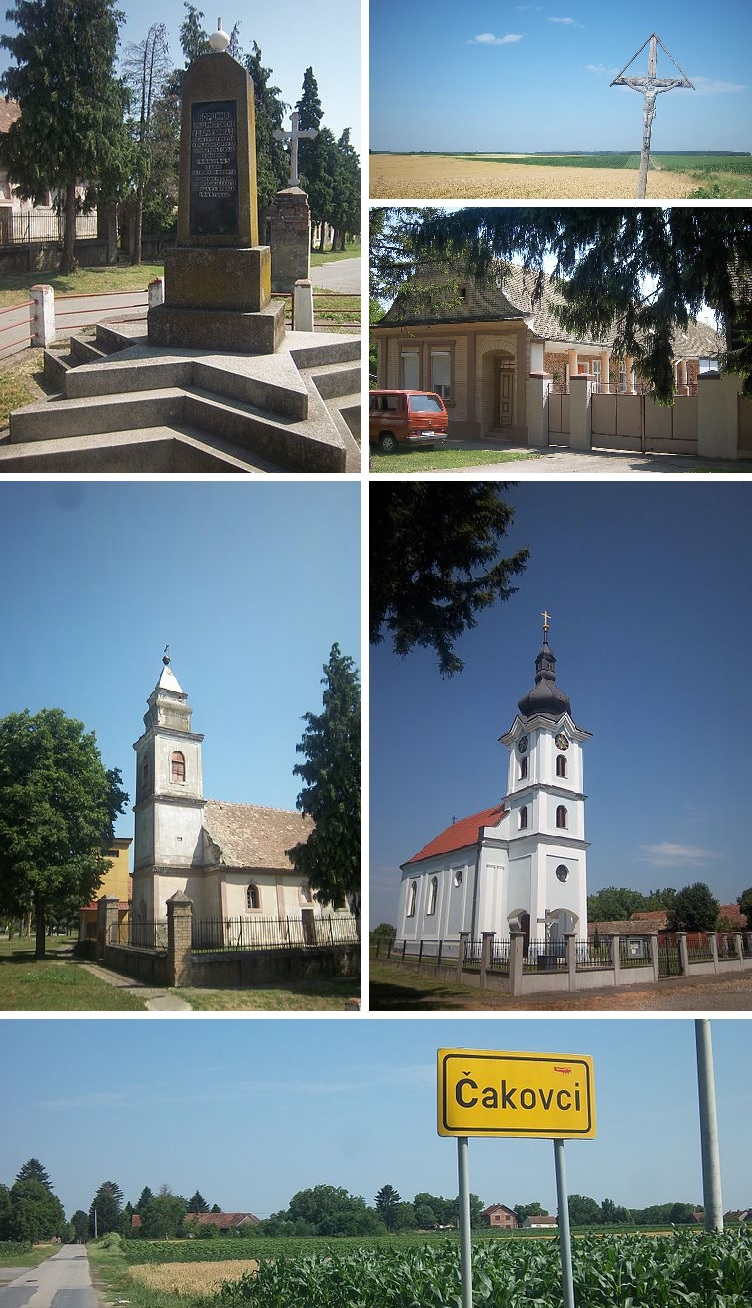

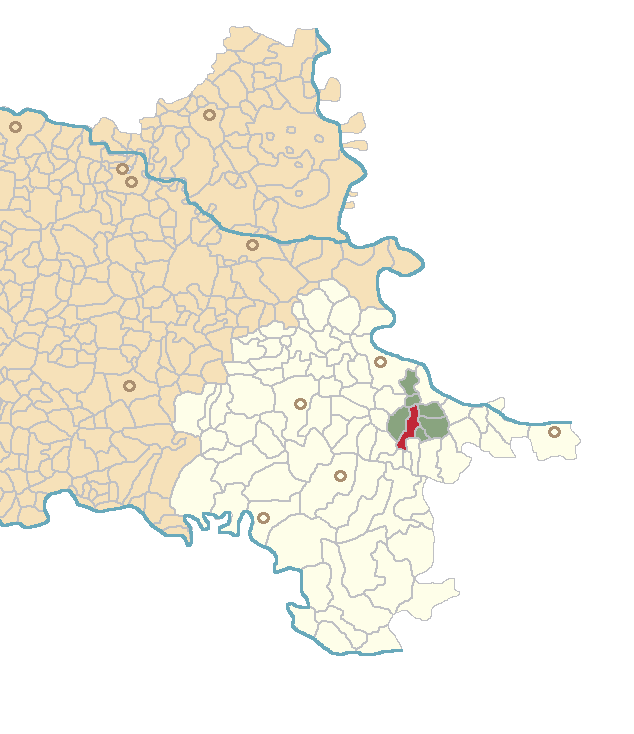

- Location of Čakovci in Croatia Čakovci (Croatia) Čakovci (Europe)
- Coordinates: 45°14′10″N 19°03′30″E
- Country: Croatia
- Region: Syrmia (Podunavlje)
- County: Vukovar-Syrmia
- Municipality: Tompojevci

Area
  - Total: 6.4 sq mi (16.5 km^{2})

Population (2021)
  - Total: 264
  - Density: 41.4/sq mi (16.0/km^{2})
- Demonym(s): Čakovčanin (♂) Čakovčankaa (♀) (per grammatical gender)
- Time zone: UTC+1 (CET)
  - Summer (DST): UTC+2 (CEST)
- Postal code: 32 238

Čakovci (Hungarian: Csákovác, Serbian: Чаковци) is a village in the Tompojevci municipality in eastern Croatia.

== Name ==
The name of the village in Croatian is plural.

== History ==
The continuous human presence in village comes from the period of Middle Ages. The papal legate two times visited village, first time in 1333 and second in 1335. The first sources in which village was mentioned used its Hungarian name Chak which was subsequently Croatized into modern day version Čakovci. Čakovci area up to the Ottoman conquest was relatively densely populated, and after the fall of Syrmia, village was depopulated so that at the time before Ottomans withdrawal from the region in 1715 village had 8 Catholic households. One household was from Sarajevo.

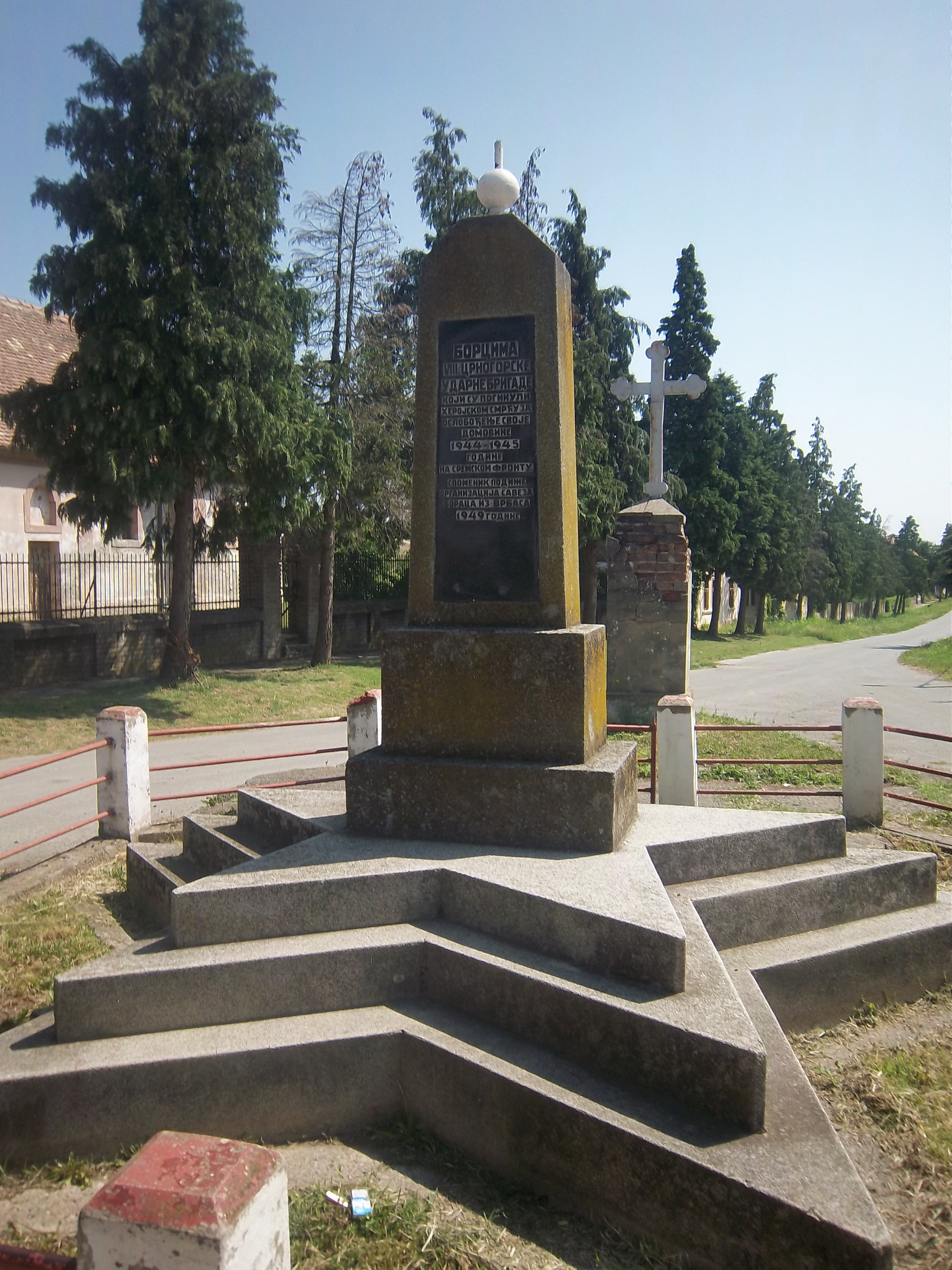
WWII monument to 4th Montenegrin Proletarian Brigade

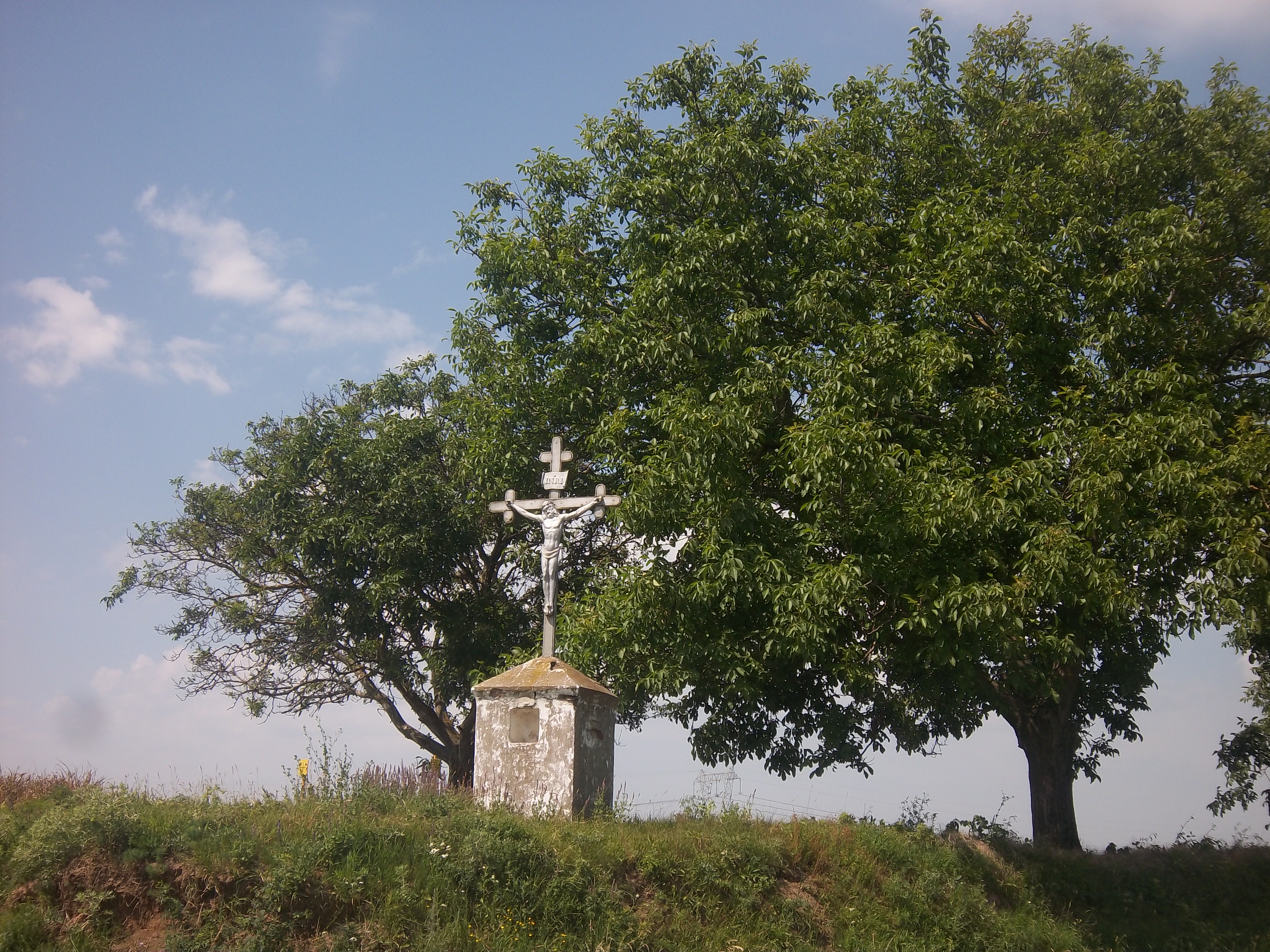
cross on the road to Berak

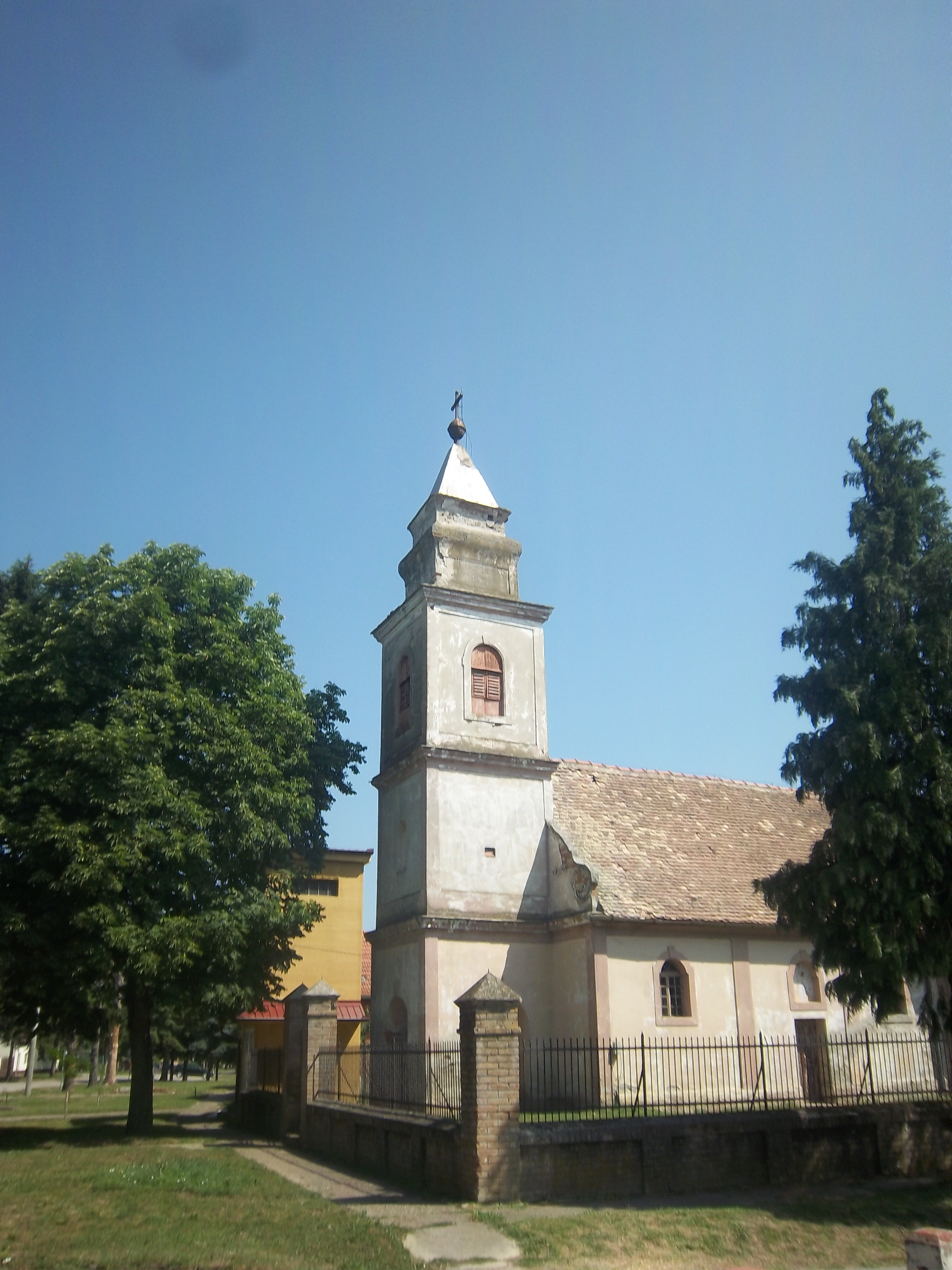
Serbian Orthodox Church of the Presentation of the Theotokos

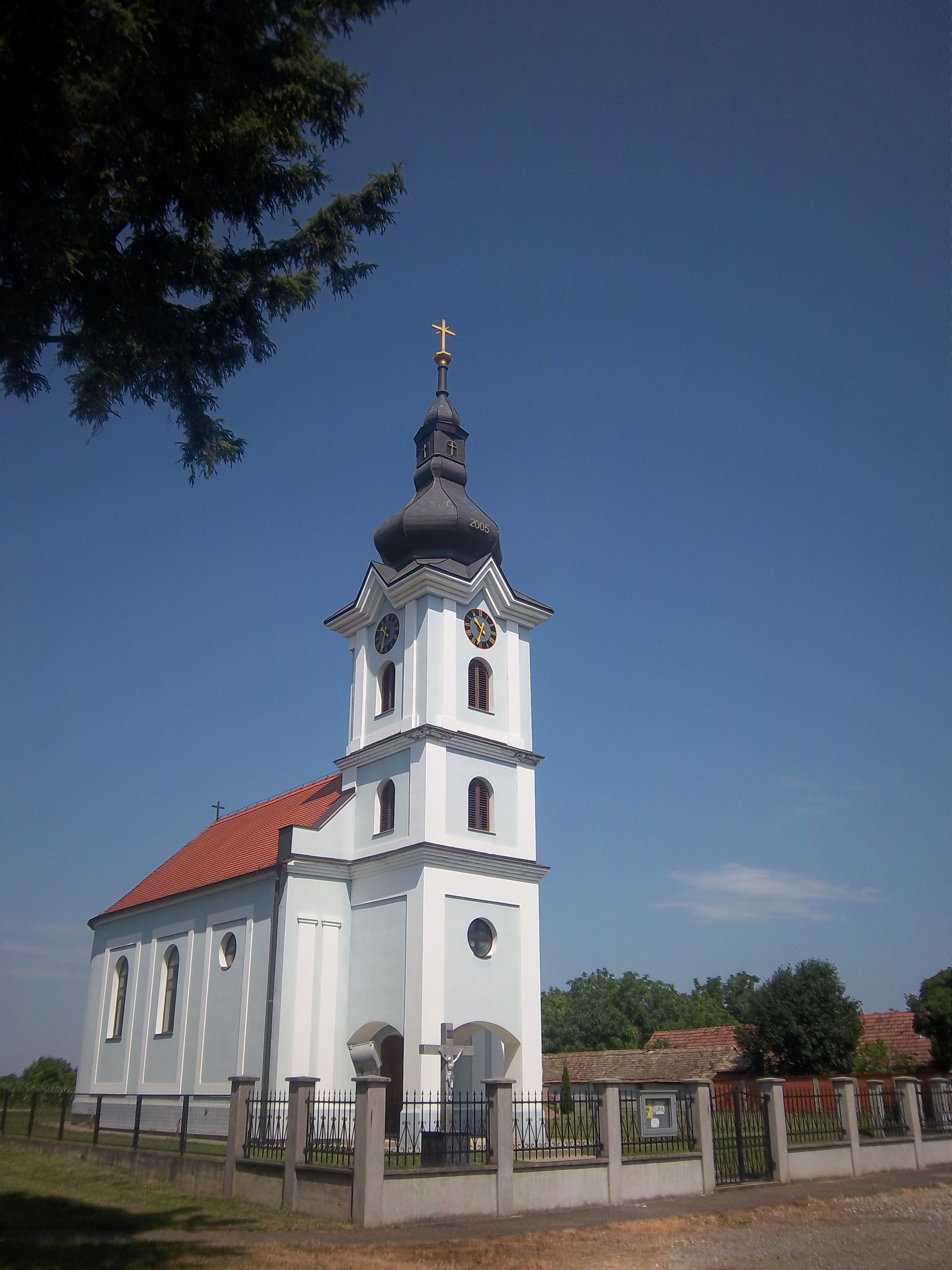
Roman Catholic Church

After the departure of the Ottomans, the King's chamber began to settle Orthodox subjects in Čakovci. Those Orthodox subjects came from Bosnia and Baranja. Following Ottoman retreat from the region, the Lordship of Vukovar was established, and the village became part of its domain. In 1723 there was already 30 Orthodox houses in village. In 1732 a wooden orthodox church was built and in 1764 rock one.

Village population increased over time so that in 1847 it counted 690 residents. Out of that number 492 of them were Roman Catholics and Orthodox 195. Increasing immigration of ethnic Hungarians was also present so that Hungarian society "Julian" was opened in 1907 as well as elementary school in Hungarian. Rail link connected Čakovci with Ilača and Vukovar in 1912. In 1826/28 along with Orthodox, Roman Catholic church was built. Church was severely burned and devastated during Croatian War of Independence. Through history, local Orthodox residents fell within the parish in Novi Banovci, and Roman Catholic under the one in Mikluševci. Houses in the village were originally built along the road connecting those two villages.

On the village square Alliance of fighters from Vrbas built the monument in the 1949 to the Yugoslav Partisans fighters from the 4th Montenegrin Proletarian Brigade from the time of Syrmian Front during the World War II. Basis of the monument has a shape of a red star.

On April 12, 1993 Serb paramilitaries in the SAO Eastern Slavonia, Baranja and Western Syrmia burned down the local Roman Catholic church in the village.

== Education ==
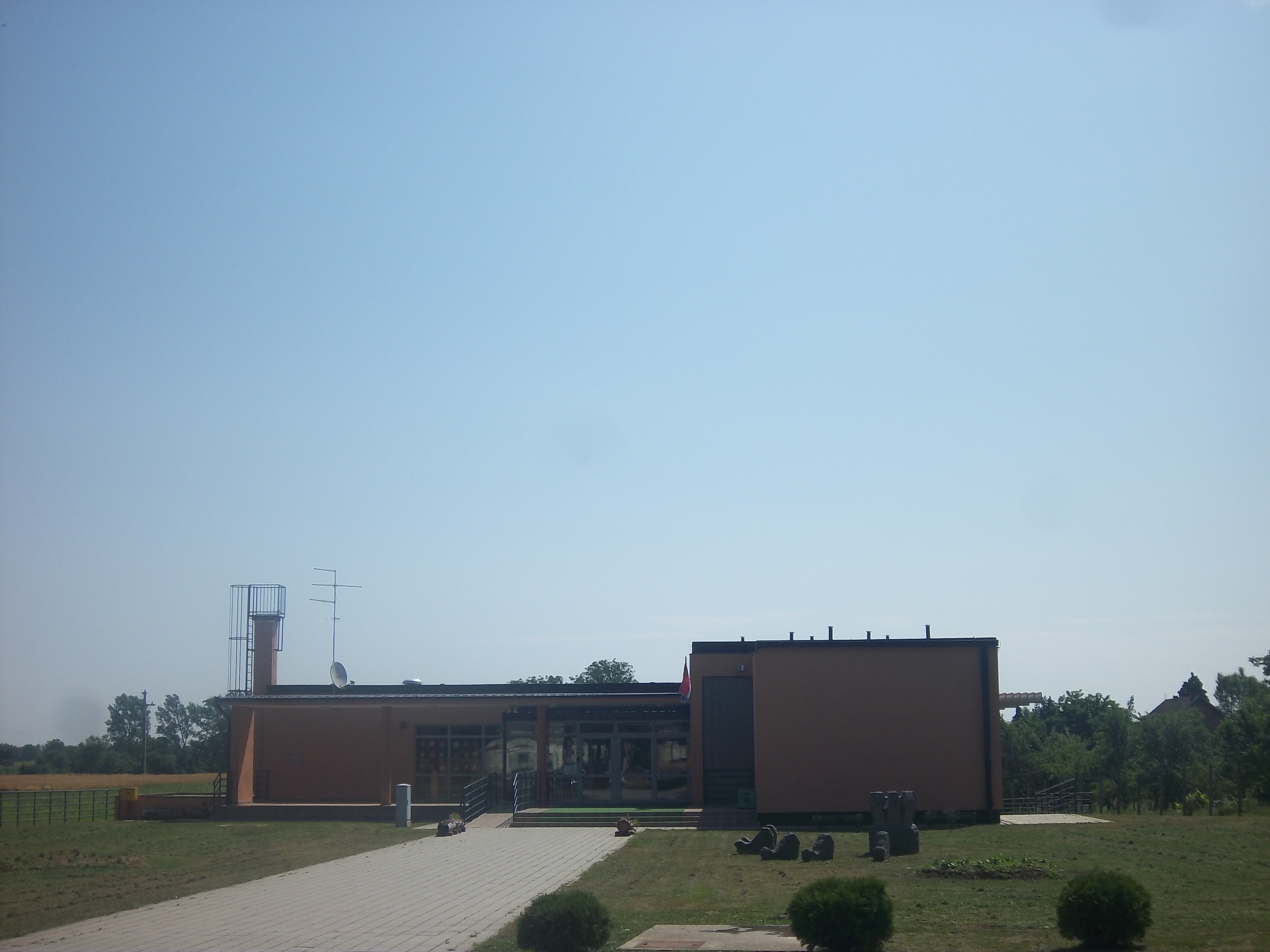
School building entrance

There is one 8 year elementary school in Čakovci. Since many historical documents were destroyed during Croatian War of Independence there are no certain information about school historical work. After Eastern Slavonia, Baranja and Western Syrmia were reintegrated into Croatia through UNTAES mandate, in 1997/8 school began to work with 107 students. Although village is not the seat of municipality, local school is central schools on its territory. Schools in Tompojevci, Mikluševci, Bokšić and Berak are branch schools (Croatian: područna škola/područne škole) of Elementary School Čakovci. Today, classes are held in Croatian and Gaj Latin script with elective classes fostering Rusyn and culture, and the Hungarian language and culture. In first years after reintegration school was one of institutions that offered parallel classes in Serbian and Croatian. Today students that want to study fully in Serbian and Cyrillic script study in nearby Negoslavci.

== Culture ==
In 1953 the Hungarian community established the Petőfi Sándor Cultural-Artistic Association, which is still active today. From 1968 until 1998 association used name Cultural-Artistic Brotherhood and Unity. Association brings together different age groups, from school children to elderly, who help to preserve Hungarian old customs and costumes. It has around 70 members. Association often participate in events in Hungary, Romania and Vojvodina in Serbia.

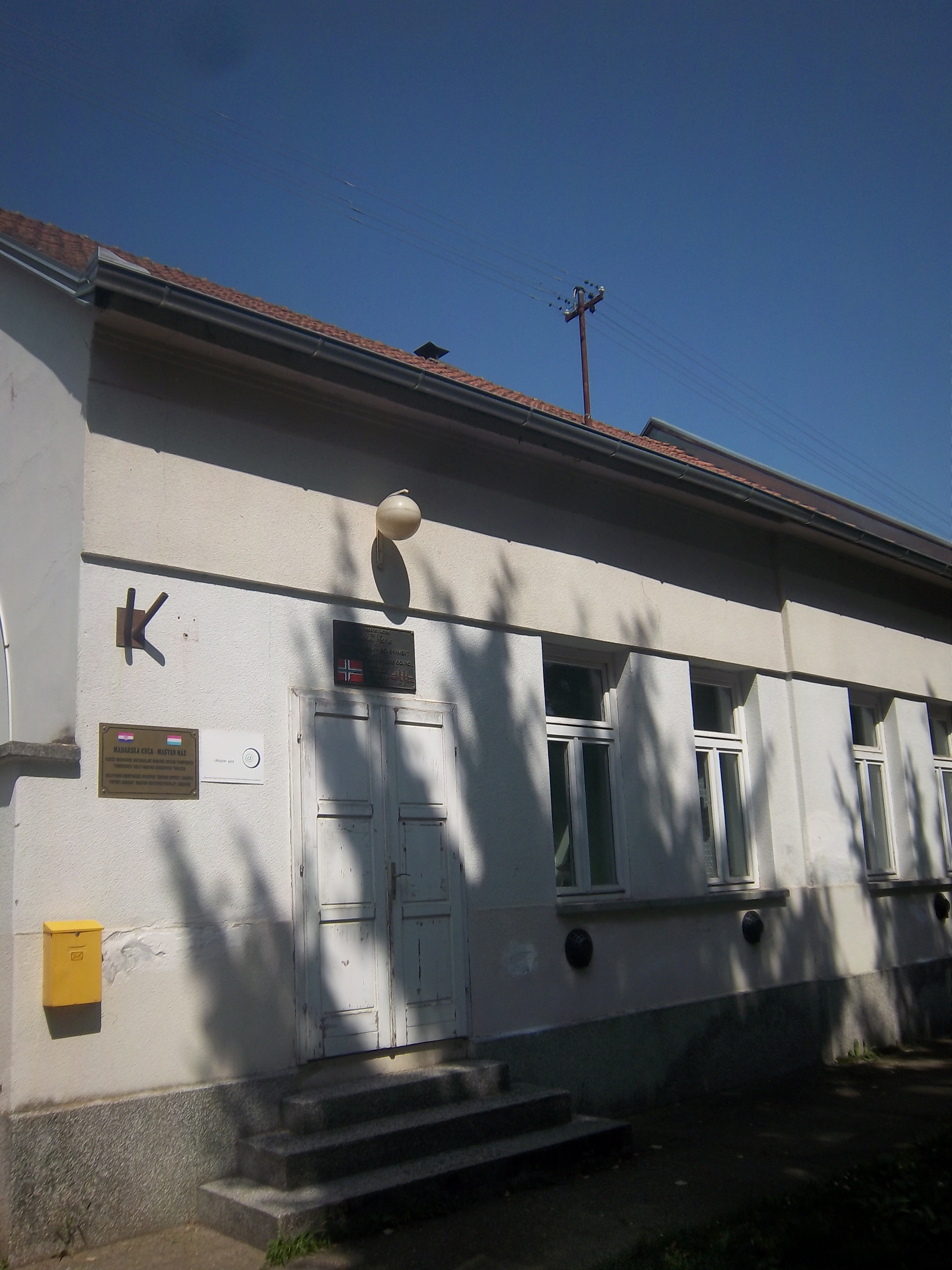
Hungarian House in Čakovci

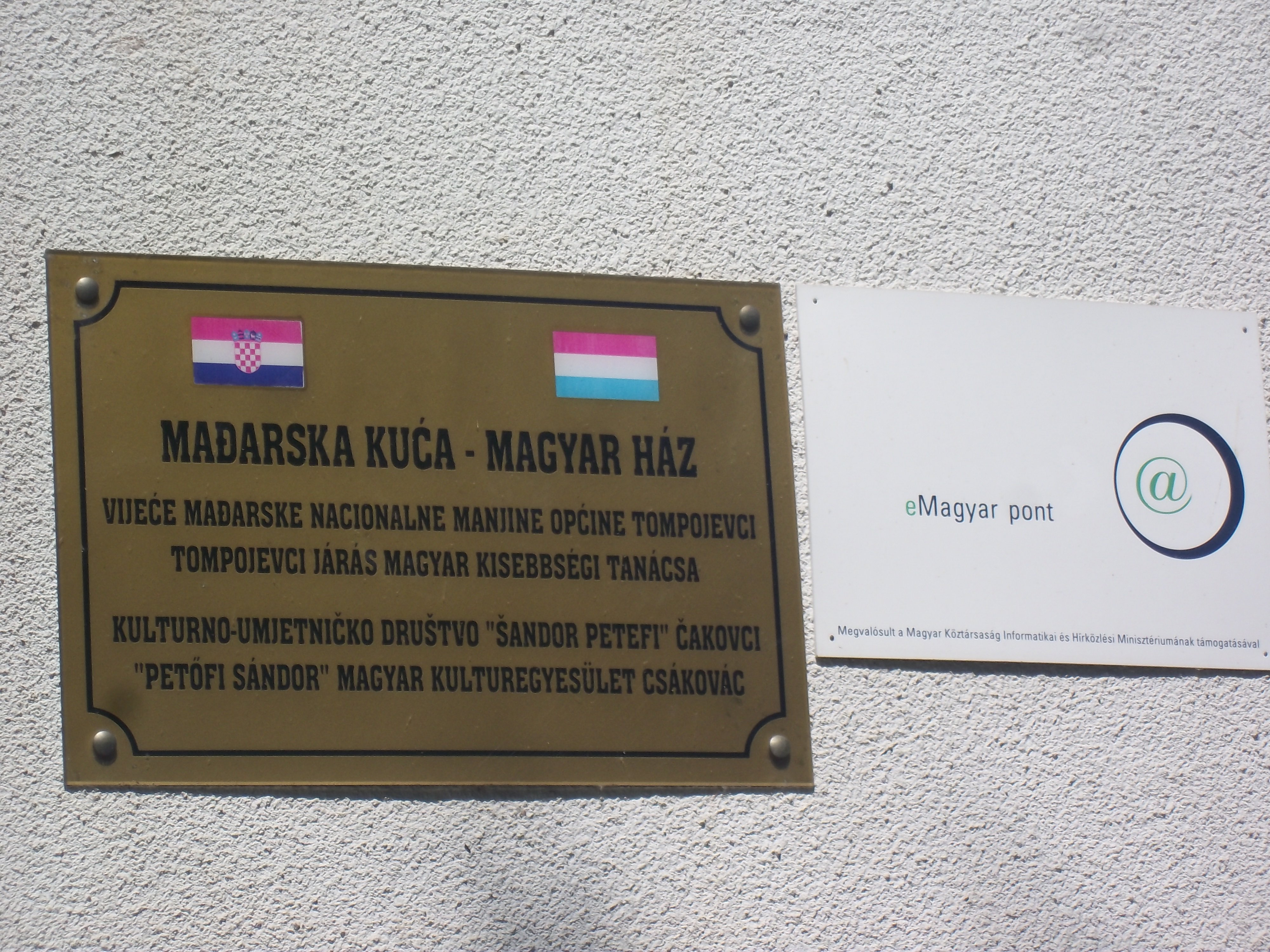
Bilingual plate on Hungarian House in Čakovci

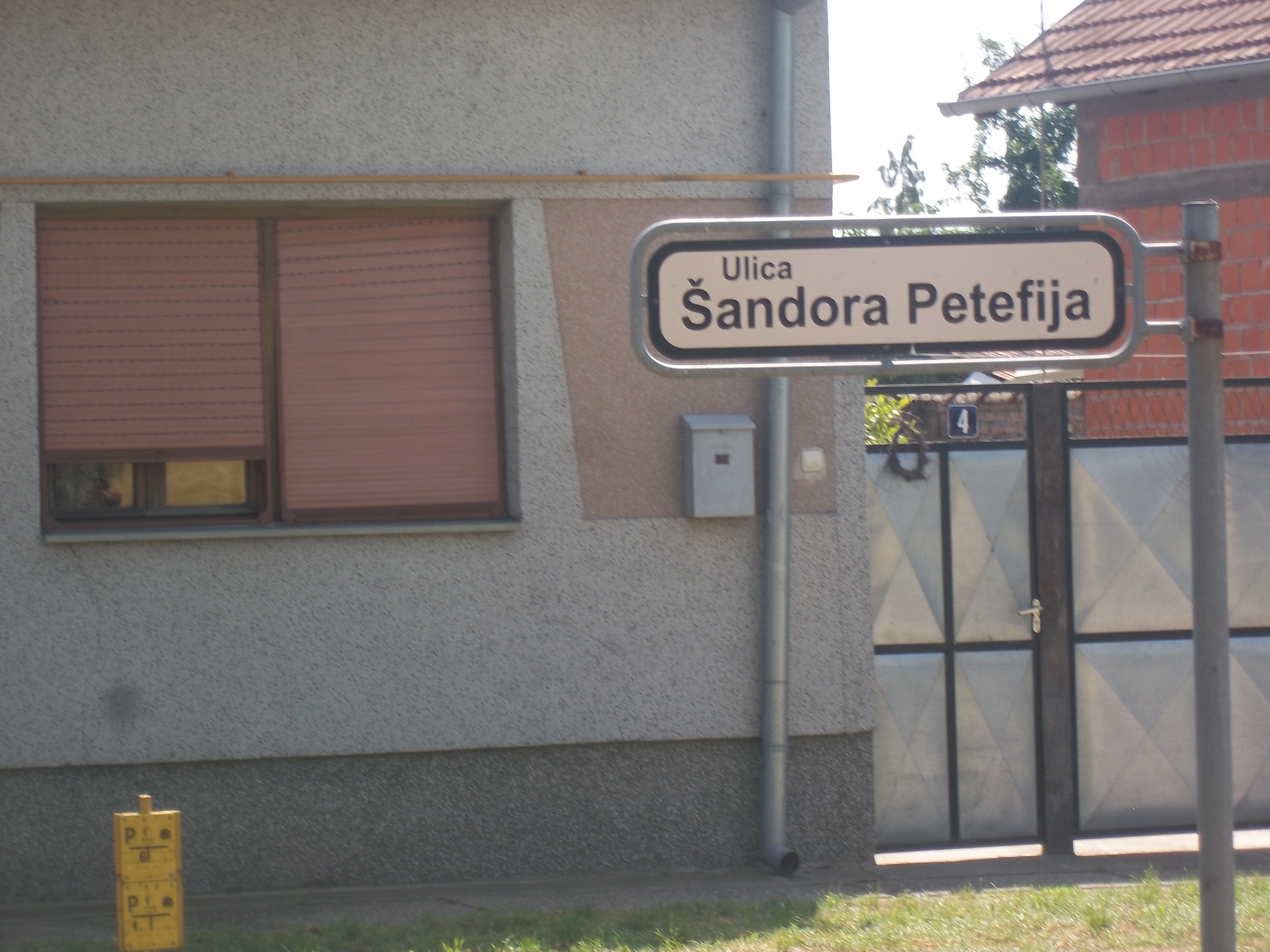
Sándor Petőfi Street

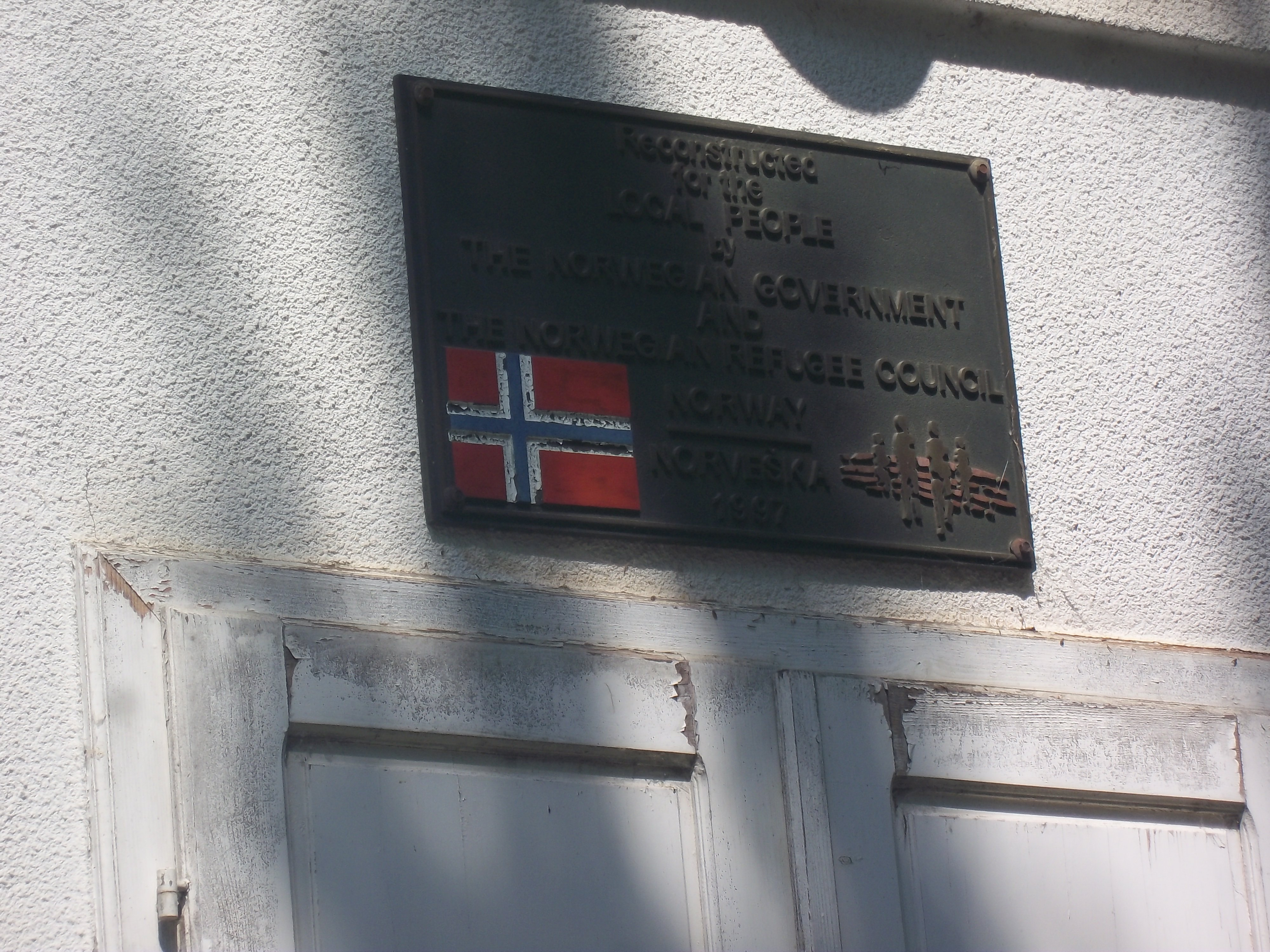
Plate marking donation from Government of Norway and Norwegian Refugee Council from 1997
