= Bokšić =

Bokšić may refer to:

- Bokšić, Vukovar-Srijem County, a village near Tompojevci, Croatia
- Bokšić, Osijek-Baranja County, a village near Đurđenovac, Croatia
- Bokšić, Kosovo, a village near Klina
- Alen Bokšić (born 1970), Croatian football player
