= Borova Kosa =

- Village
- Location within Croatia
- Coordinates: 45.6502889°N 17.2286683°E
- Country: Croatia
- County: Bjelovar-Bilogora County
- Municipality: Đulovac

Area
  - Total: 1.7 sq mi (4.3 km^{2})

Population (2021)
  - Total: 53
  - Density: 32/sq mi (12/km^{2})
- Time zone: UTC+1 (CET)
  - Summer (DST): UTC+2 (CEST)

Borova Kosa is a village in Croatia.

== Demographics ==
According to the 2021 census, its population was 53.
