= Donja Vrijeska =

- Village
- Location within Croatia
- Coordinates: 45.6397263°N 17.2458695°E
- Country: Croatia
- County: Bjelovar-Bilogora County
- Municipality: Đulovac

Area
  - Total: 1.4 sq mi (3.6 km^{2})

Population (2021)
  - Total: 50
  - Density: 36/sq mi (14/km^{2})
- Time zone: UTC+1 (CET)
  - Summer (DST): UTC+2 (CEST)

Donja Vrijeska is a village in Croatia.

== Demographics ==
According to the 2021 census, its population was 50.
