= Maslenjača =

- Village
- Location within Croatia
- Coordinates: 45.6458958°N 17.2649762°E
- Country: Croatia
- County: Bjelovar-Bilogora County
- Municipality: Đulovac

Area
  - Total: 3.3 sq mi (8.5 km^{2})

Population (2021)
  - Total: 138
  - Density: 42/sq mi (16/km^{2})
- Time zone: UTC+1 (CET)
  - Summer (DST): UTC+2 (CEST)

Maslenjača is a village in Croatia.

== Demographics ==
According to the 2021 census, its population was 138.
