= Potočani, Đulovac =

Potočani
- Village
- Location within Croatia
- Coordinates: 45.6407241°N 17.3514986°E
- Country: Croatia
- County: Bjelovar-Bilogora County
- Municipality: Đulovac

Area
  - Total: 4.1 sq mi (10.5 km^{2})

Population (2021)
  - Total: 30
  - Density: 7.4/sq mi (2.9/km^{2})
- Time zone: UTC+1 (CET)
  - Summer (DST): UTC+2 (CEST)

Potočani is a village in Croatia.

== Demographics ==
According to the 2021 census, its population was 30.
