= Gornja Vrijeska =

- Village
- Location within Croatia
- Coordinates: 45.625641°N 17.288445°E
- Country: Croatia
- County: Bjelovar-Bilogora County
- Municipality: Đulovac

Area
  - Total: 1.7 sq mi (4.4 km^{2})

Population (2021)
  - Total: 34
  - Density: 20/sq mi (7.7/km^{2})
- Time zone: UTC+1 (CET)
  - Summer (DST): UTC+2 (CEST)

Gornja Vrijeska is a village in Croatia. It is connected by the D34 highway.

== History ==
On 26 March 2022 at 13:35 the JVP Grada Daruvara received a call about a wildfire in the area. 10.5 hectares (26 acres) burned by the time it was put out at 18:28 by JVP Daruvar and DVD Đulovac.

== Demographics ==
According to the 2021 census, its population was 34. It was 42 in 2011.
