= Puklica =

- Village
- Location within Croatia
- Coordinates: 45.6308302°N 17.3886274°E
- Country: Croatia
- County: Bjelovar-Bilogora County
- Municipality: Đulovac

Area
  - Total: 3.1 sq mi (8.0 km^{2})

Population (2021)
  - Total: 102
  - Density: 33/sq mi (13/km^{2})
- Time zone: UTC+1 (CET)
  - Summer (DST): UTC+2 (CEST)

Puklica is a village in Croatia.

== Demographics ==
According to the 2021 census, its population was 102.
