= Batinjska Rijeka =

- Village
- Location within Croatia
- Coordinates: 45.609309°N 17.2647379°E
- Country: Croatia
- County: Bjelovar-Bilogora County
- Municipality: Đulovac

Area
  - Total: 1.3 sq mi (3.3 km^{2})

Population (2021)
  - Total: 29
  - Density: 23/sq mi (8.8/km^{2})
- Time zone: UTC+1 (CET)
  - Summer (DST): UTC+2 (CEST)

Batinjska Rijeka is a village in Croatia.

== Demographics ==
According to the 2021 census, its population was 29.
