= Mala Babina Gora =

- Village
- Location within Croatia
- Coordinates: 45.7065959°N 17.4069128°E
- Country: Croatia
- County: Bjelovar-Bilogora County
- Municipality: Đulovac

Area
  - Total: 2.0 sq mi (5.1 km^{2})

Population (2021)
  - Total: 21
  - Density: 11/sq mi (4.1/km^{2})
- Time zone: UTC+1 (CET)
  - Summer (DST): UTC+2 (CEST)

Mala Babina Gora is a village in Croatia.

== Demographics ==
According to the 2021 census, its population was 21.
