= Vukovije =

- Village
- Location within Croatia
- Country: Croatia
- County: Bjelovar-Bilogora County
- Municipality: Đulovac

Area
  - Total: 0.66 sq mi (1.7 km^{2})

Population (2021)
  - Total: 91
  - Density: 140/sq mi (54/km^{2})
- Time zone: UTC+1 (CET)
  - Summer (DST): UTC+2 (CEST)

Vukovije is a village in Croatia. It is connected by the D34 highway.

== Demographics ==
According to the 2021 census, its population was 91.
