= Nova Krivaja =

- Village
- Location within Croatia
- Coordinates: 45.6384512°N 17.4062581°E
- Country: Croatia
- County: Bjelovar-Bilogora County
- Municipality: Đulovac

Area
  - Total: 4.4 sq mi (11.3 km^{2})

Population (2021)
  - Total: 69
  - Density: 16/sq mi (6.1/km^{2})
- Time zone: UTC+1 (CET)
  - Summer (DST): UTC+2 (CEST)

Nova Krivaja is a village in Croatia.

== Demographics ==
According to the 2021 census, its population was 69.
