= Ernst Thälmann Company =

Company of Yugoslav Partisans

Ernst Thalmann Company
- Die deutsche Partisanentruppe „Ernst Thälmann"; Nemačka Četa Ernest Telman
- Flag of German Minority
- Active: 15 August 1943 — Summer 1944
- Disbanded: Summer 1944
- Country: Independent State of Croatia
- Allegiance: Yugoslav Partisans
- Size: 40
- Part of: Podravina Detachment
- Nickname(s): Red Company or Telmanovci

Commanders
- First commander: Rudolph Vanpotić

The Ernst Thalmann Company (Serbo-Croatian: Nemačka Četa Ernest Telman, German: die deutsche Partisanentruppe „Ernst Thälmann") was a company within Yugoslav Partisans composed of ethnic Germans from Slavonia (then Independent State of Croatia, modern day Croatia). It belonged to the Podravina Detachment of Sixth Slavonian Corp of Yugoslav Partisans. The company was established on 15 August 1943 in Slatinski Drenovac, from the order of the Sixth Slavonian Corp and composed of 10 Germans, 5 of them being members of the Communist Party for many years. Its first commander was Rudolph Vanpotić. Initially it was composed of 40 soldiers, mostly of German ethnicity and a number of Serbs and Croats. The Ernst Thalmann Company was disestablished in Summer of 1944. This company was named after Ernst Thälmann, the leader of the Communist Party of Germany (KPD) during much of the Weimar Republic.

The intention of Partisan command was to mobilize as many young Germans as possible, to prevent their participation in Waffen-SS units and German police. The members of the company included several women of German ethnicity. The commanders of Telman Company were Germans who issued orders on German language hoisting national flag of German minority in Yugoslavia. The company was reinforced with squad of heavy machineguns.

== In popular culture ==
The story of the company and its founding are a major plotline in the 2004 Croatian movie Long Dark Night directed by Antun Vrdoljak.

== Sources ==
- Terzić, Velimir (1957). Oslobodilacki rat naroda Jugoslavije 1941-1945. Vojni istoriski Institut Jugoslovenske narodne armije.
- Vidović, Gabro (1965). Među slavonskim partizanima. Epoha.
- Centar (1984). Zbornik Centra za drustvena istrazivanja Slavonije i Baranje. Centar za drustvena istrazivanja Slavonije i Baranje.
- Petranović, Branko (1985). Revolucije i pokreti otpora u Evropi: 1939-1945. Zavod za unapreduvanje na stopanstvoto vo SRM "Samoupravna praktika".
- Boban, Ljubo (1976). Sjeverozapadna Hrvatska u NOB-u i socijalističkoj revoluciji: zbornik. Zajednica općina memorijalnog područja Kalnik.
