= Church of the Nativity of the Theotokos, Mikluševci =

Church of the Nativity of the Theotokos
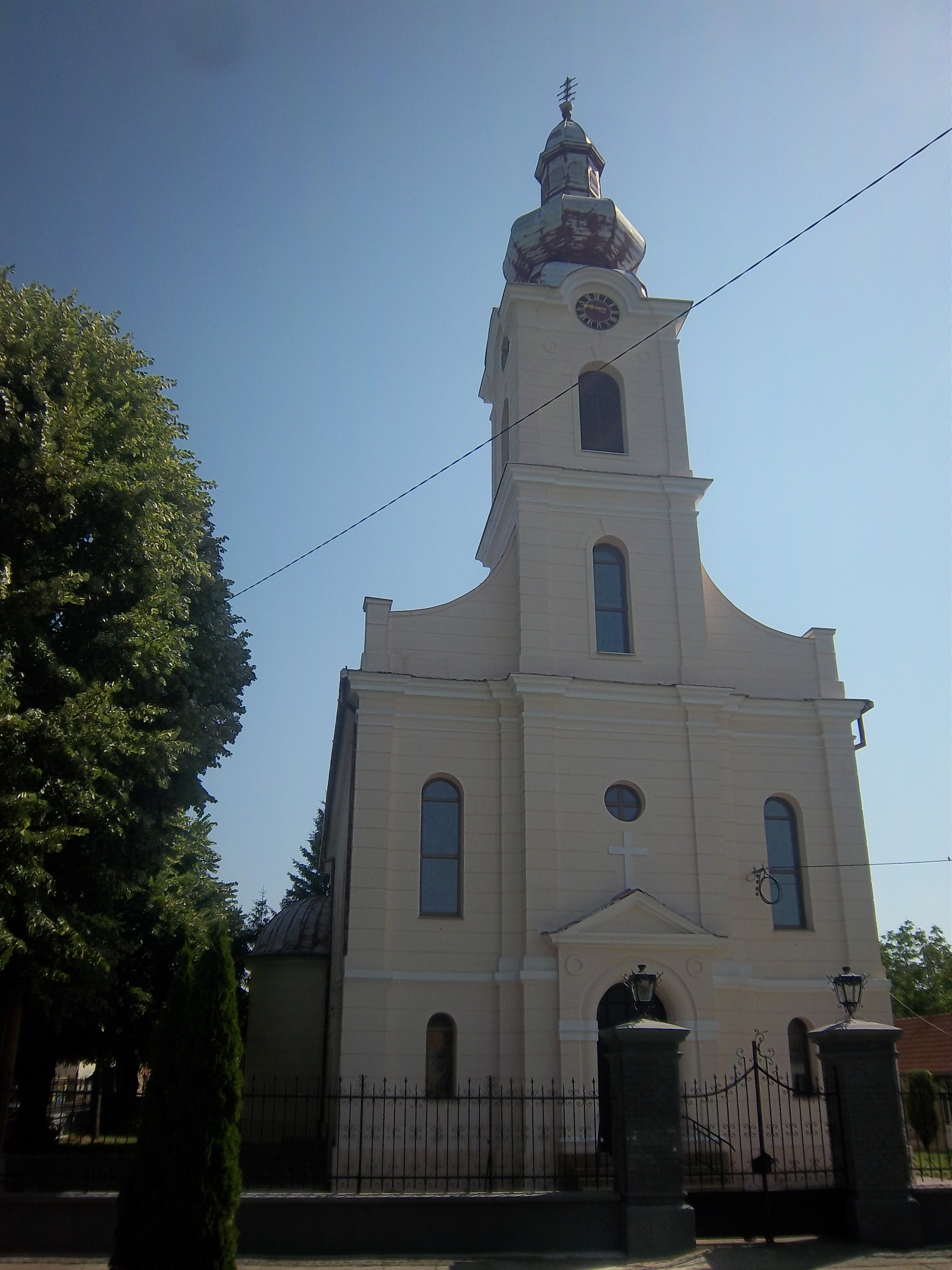
- Church of the Nativity of the Theotokos
- Location: Mikluševci, Vukovar-Syrmia County
- Country: Croatia
- Denomination: Greek Catholic Church of Croatia and Serbia

History
- Status: Church
- Dedication: Nativity of the Theotokos

Architecture
- Functional status: Active
- Years built: 1907

The Church of the Nativity of the Theotokos in Mikluševci in eastern Croatia is a Greek Catholic parish church of the Greek Catholic Church of Croatia and Serbia. It was constructed in 1907. The local Pannonian Rusyns Greek Catholic community was established in 1859 and canonically recognized in 1930. The church was damaged during the Croatian War of Independence. The Greek Catholic Rusyn community started to settle in Mikluševci in the early 19th century and already in 1880 out of 712 inhabitants 467 were Greek Catholic, 227 Eastern Orthodox, 11 Roman Catholic and 7 Jewish

== See also ==
- Ruthenian Uniate Church
- Hungarian Greek Catholic Church
- Križevci Cathedral
- Greek Catholic Co-cathedral of Saints Cyril and Methodius, Zagreb
- St. Nicholas Cathedral, Ruski Krstur
- Church of St. Nicholas, Mikluševci
- Pannonian Rusyn
- 1993 Roman Catholic and Eastern Orthodox declaration on uniate Eastern Catholic Churches
- Ecumenism
