= Škodinovac =

- Village
- Location within Croatia
- Coordinates: 45.6262623°N 17.2956132°E
- Country: Croatia
- County: Bjelovar-Bilogora County
- Municipality: Đulovac

Area
  - Total: 1.6 sq mi (4.1 km^{2})

Population (2021)
  - Total: 34
  - Density: 21/sq mi (8.3/km^{2})
- Time zone: UTC+1 (CET)
  - Summer (DST): UTC+2 (CEST)

Škodinovac is a village in Croatia.

== Demographics ==
According to the 2021 census, its population was 34.
