= Katinac =

- Village
- Location within Croatia
- Coordinates: 45.6315091°N 17.3693634°E
- Country: Croatia
- County: Bjelovar-Bilogora County
- Municipality: Đulovac

Area
  - Total: 3.8 sq mi (9.8 km^{2})

Population (2021)
  - Total: 101
  - Density: 27/sq mi (10/km^{2})
- Time zone: UTC+1 (CET)
  - Summer (DST): UTC+2 (CEST)

Katinac is a village in Croatia.

== Demographics ==
According to the 2021 census, its population was 101.
