= Berak killings =

1991 mass murder of Croat civilians

- Part of the Croatian War of Independence
- Berak on the map of Croatia, JNA/SAO Krajina-held areas in late 1991 are highlighted in red
- Location: 45.231667°N 19.027778°E; Berak, Croatia
- Date: September - December 1991
- Target: Croats
- Attack type: Mass murder, ethnic cleansing
- Deaths: 44-45
- Perpetrators: Eastern Slavonia, Baranja and Western Syrmia Territorial Defense, Scorpions paramilitaries

The Berak killings was the mass murder of Croat civilians by Serb rebels and paramilitaries from September until December 1991, in the village of Berak, near Vukovar, during the Croatian War of Independence.

== Background ==
During the September 1991 Yugoslav Campaign in Croatia, JNA, local Krajina Serb forces and various paramilitary groups attacked and occupied several villages in Eastern Slavonia and Croatian Syrmia (modern-day Vukovar-Srijem County) during the JNA-led offensive against Vukovar and adjacent areas. The village of Berak fell to Serb forces, which included local Serb rebels from neighbouring villages as well as Scorpions paramilitaries, on 2 September 1991.

== Killings ==
Over the following months, until December 1991, Serb forces routinely abused, killed and expelled the Croat inhabitants who remained in the village. Croat civilians were killed in their homes, in the streets or in a detention camp set up by Serb forces during the occupation. Croats were also tortured and several cases of rape occurred. 27 Croat men were sent by Serb forces to the Begejci camp in Serbia, where they were subjected to forced labour and torture.

Sources estimate 44-45 Croat casualties with 28 or 34 killed and 17 or 10 missing, respectively. During these massacres, many of the bodies were thrown into wells or were buried in mass graves.

During the killings, the local Catholic Church of the Martyrdom of St. John the Baptist was vandalised and used as a bar for the Scorpions paramilitaries to consume alcohol.

In 2014, the county court in Osijek cleared Croatian Serb rebel commander, Gojko Eror, of having command responsibility for the killings, torture, disappearance and expulsion of Croat civilians, citing a lack of evidence. Dropping the war crimes charges, it modified the indictment to accuse Eror of a ‘criminal act of armed rebellion’.
