= Velika Babina Gora =

- Village
- Location within Croatia
- Coordinates: 45.718099°N 17.4190481°E
- Country: Croatia
- County: Bjelovar-Bilogora County
- Municipality: Đulovac

Area
  - Total: 1.4 sq mi (3.5 km^{2})

Population (2021)
  - Total: 31
  - Density: 23/sq mi (8.9/km^{2})
- Time zone: UTC+1 (CET)
  - Summer (DST): UTC+2 (CEST)

Velika Babina Gora is a village in Croatia.

== Demographics ==
According to the 2021 census, its population was 31.
