= Korenica (surname) =

Korenica is a surname. People with the surname include:

- Meriton Korenica, a Kosovan footballer
- Visar Korenica, a Kosovan Albanian politician

== See also ==
- Korenica (disambiguation)
