= Bokšić, Vukovar-Srijem County =

Bokšić
- Village
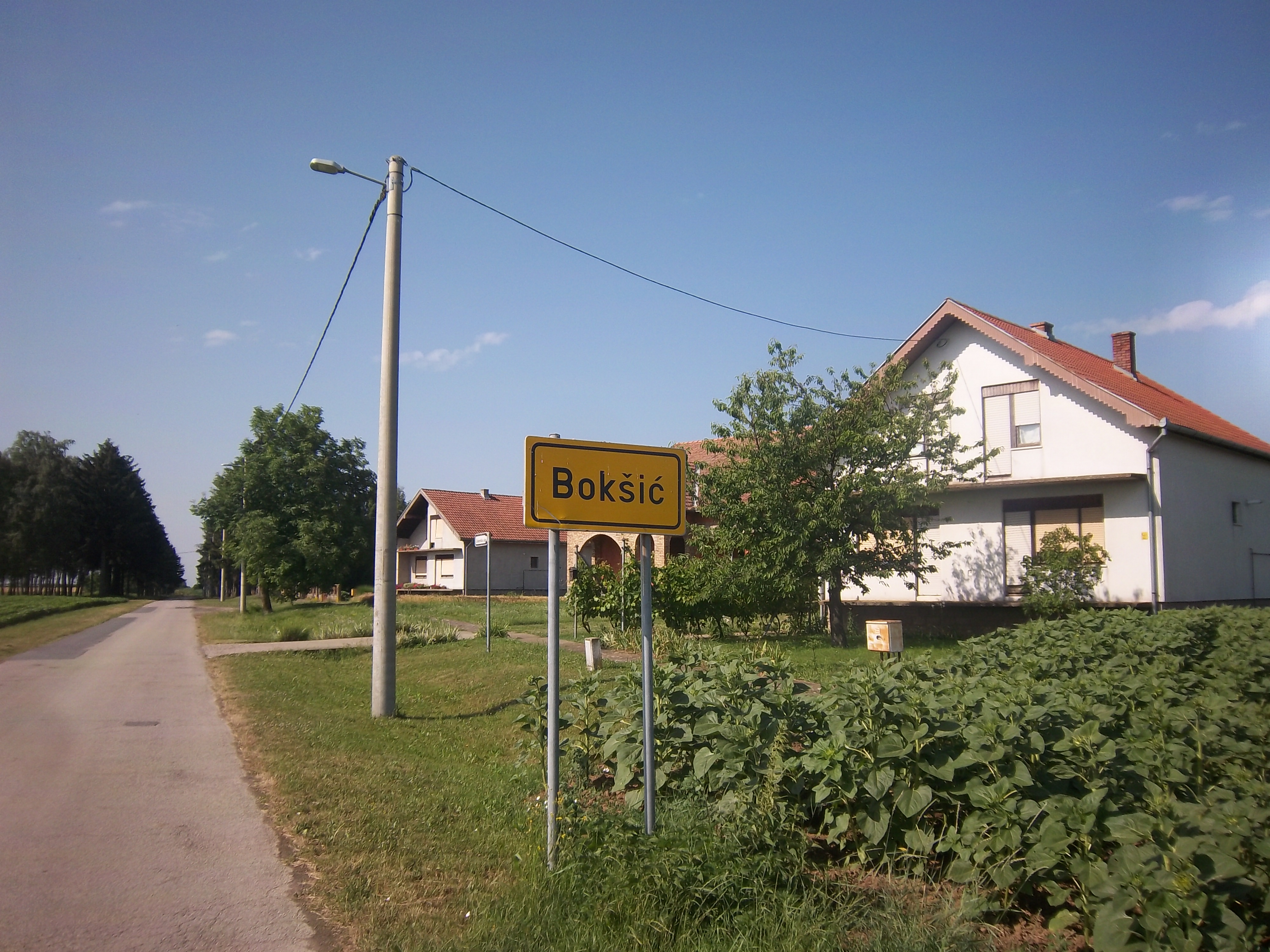

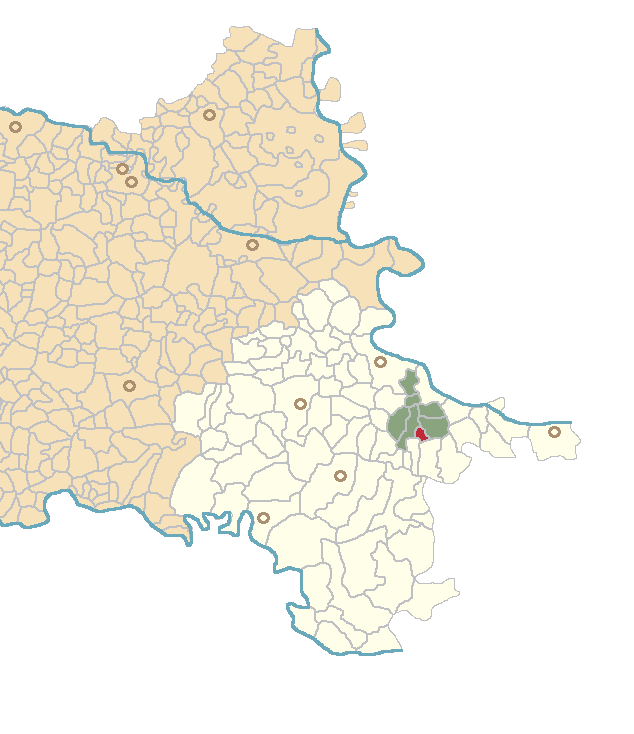

- Location in Croatia Bokšić (Croatia) Bokšić (Europe)
- Coordinates: 45.212°N 19.079°E
- Country: Croatia
- Region: Syrmia (Podunavlje)
- County: Vukovar-Syrmia
- Municipality: Tompojevci

Area
  - Total: 3.9 km^{2} (1.5 sq mi)

Population (2021)
  - Total: 83
  - Density: 21/km^{2} (55/sq mi)
- Time zone: UTC+1 (CET)

Bokšić is a small village south of Čakovci in the municipality of Tompojevci.

The village of Bokšić began to be settled in 1941. Residents from the vicinity of Velika Gorica settled in Bokšić who were looking for fertile land, and in order to get a permit to move they had to be moral and exemplary citizens and pay all tax obligations to the state. In the area of Bokšić, they cleared the forest and built a village.

== Sport ==
The village has a football team known as NK Polet Boskic.
