= Koreničani =

- Village
- Location within Croatia
- Coordinates: 45.6448431°N 17.2848843°E
- Country: Croatia
- County: Bjelovar-Bilogora County
- Municipality: Đulovac

Area
  - Total: 8.0 sq mi (20.8 km^{2})

Population (2021)
  - Total: 208
  - Density: 25.9/sq mi (10.0/km^{2})
- Time zone: UTC+1 (CET)
  - Summer (DST): UTC+2 (CEST)

Koreničani is a village in Croatia.

== Demographics ==
According to the 2021 census, its population was 208.
