= Veliki Miletinac =

- Village
- Location within Croatia
- Coordinates: 45.6819689°N 17.3204344°E
- Country: Croatia
- County: Bjelovar-Bilogora County
- Municipality: Đulovac

Area
  - Total: 1.4 sq mi (3.5 km^{2})

Population (2021)
  - Total: 50
  - Density: 37/sq mi (14/km^{2})
- Time zone: UTC+1 (CET)
  - Summer (DST): UTC+2 (CEST)

Veliki Miletinac is a village in Croatia.

== Demographics ==
According to the 2021 census, its population was 50.
