= Mali Bastaji =

- Village
- Location within Croatia
- Country: Croatia
- County: Bjelovar-Bilogora County
- Municipality: Đulovac

Area
  - Total: 2.3 sq mi (6.0 km^{2})

Population (2021)
  - Total: 111
  - Density: 48/sq mi (18/km^{2})
- Time zone: UTC+1 (CET)
  - Summer (DST): UTC+2 (CEST)

Mali Bastaji (German: Klein-Bastei) is a village in Croatia.

== Demographics ==
Mali Bastaji had a majority German population in 1931 (69.66%). Out of 501 people living in Mali Bastaji in 1931, 349 were Danube Swabians. According to the 2021 census, its population was 111.
