= Batinjani, Bjelovar-Bilogora County =

Batinjani
- Village
- Location within Croatia
- Country: Croatia
- County: Bjelovar-Bilogora County
- Municipality: Đulovac

Area
  - Total: 4.7 sq mi (12.1 km^{2})

Population (2021)
  - Total: 193
  - Density: 41.3/sq mi (16.0/km^{2})
- Time zone: UTC+1 (CET)
  - Summer (DST): UTC+2 (CEST)

Batinjani is a village in Croatia. It is connected by the D34 highway.

== Demographics ==
According to the 2021 census, its population was 193. It was 247 in 2011.
