= Veliki Bastaji =

- Village
- Location within Croatia
- Country: Croatia
- County: Bjelovar-Bilogora County
- Municipality: Đulovac

Area
  - Total: 6.0 sq mi (15.6 km^{2})

Population (2021)
  - Total: 532
  - Density: 88.3/sq mi (34.1/km^{2})
- Time zone: UTC+1 (CET)
  - Summer (DST): UTC+2 (CEST)

Veliki Bastaji is a village in Croatia. It is connected by the D34 highway.

== Demographics ==
According to the 2021 census, its population was 532. It was 502 in 2011.
