= Šuflaj =

Šuflaj (Sufflei or Schufflei) is a surname of German origins. The Šufflay family was from the surroundings of Baden-Württemberg, and in the middle of the 16th century they moved to Croatia:

== Origins ==
The Šufflay family is from Württemberg and they were a mining family who worked inside the Samobor mines. It is known that Mihaly Sufflei was the founder of the Šufflay family in Samobor area. It is a chance that this family originally inhabited Otruševec, the village in Samobor. In Otruševec, 1717, Martin Šufflay was moved, and many were born of him a further family of Šufflay.

Matija Šufflay of Otruševec, seems to have been be an officer of the counts Erdödy, and the lord of the Samobor city, and was particularly in the grace of his family. In 1675 in April, a charter issued in Vienna, raised Matija Šufflay "of Otruševec", and his son Martin and daughter Marija and his brothers Stjepan, Ivan, and Petar with their sons (their names are not mentioned), as well as Đuro Doltar, to the Hungarian-Croatian nobility and coat of arms.

== Notable persons ==
- Milan Šufflay (1879–1931) was a Croatian historian and politician
