= Mikluševci =

Mikluševci Миклошевци (Pannonian Rusyn)
- Village (Selo)
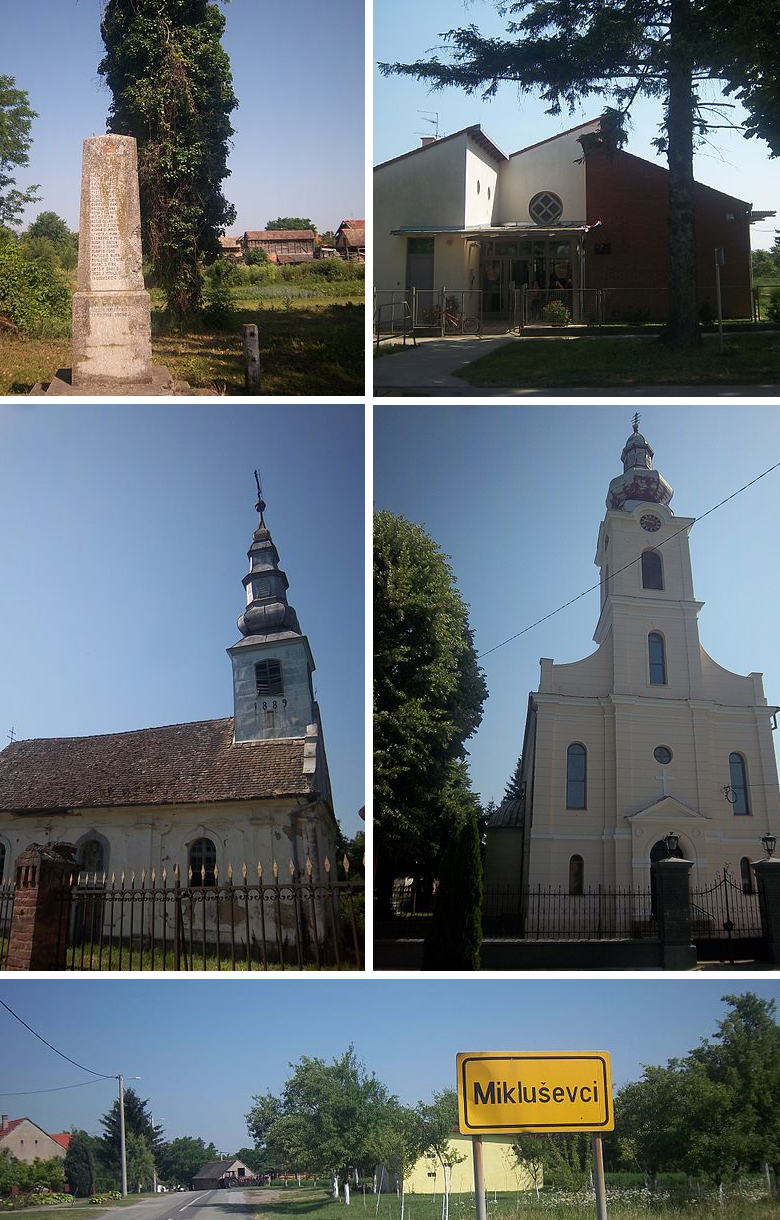

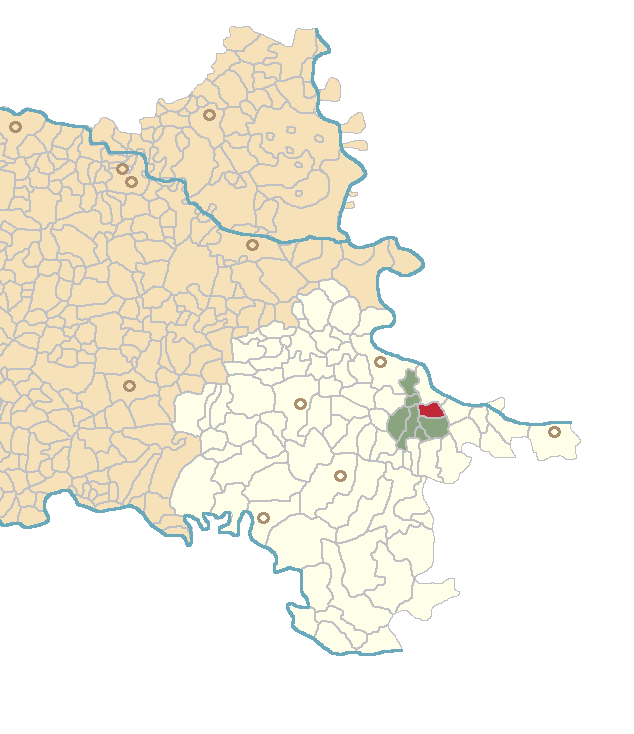

- Location in Croatia Mikluševci (Croatia) Mikluševci (Europe)
- Coordinates: 45°15′05″N 19°05′05″E
- Country: Croatia
- Region: Syrmia (Podunavlje)
- County: Vukovar-Syrmia
- Municipality: Tompojevci

Area
  - Total: 4.4 sq mi (11.5 km^{2})

Population (2021)
  - Total: 265
  - Density: 59.7/sq mi (23.0/km^{2})
- Demonym(s): Mikluševčanin (♂) Mikluševčanka (♀) (per grammatical gender)
- Time zone: UTC+1 (CET)
  - Summer (DST): UTC+2 (CEST)

Mikluševci (Pannonian Rusyn: Миклошевци, romanized: Mikloševci) is a village in Croatia.

== Name ==
The name of the village in Croatian is plural. Other than Croatian and Pannonian Rusyn the village is known as Миклушевци in Serbian, Szentmiklós in Hungarian and Sankt Niklas in German.

== History ==
It is assumed, but there are no preserved documents, that Mikluševci existed as an independent noble estate before Turkish rule. Mikluševci were under Turkish rule between 1526 and 1691, when all villages from this area were displaced. After liberation from the Turks, Orthodox Vlachs settled in Mikluševci first, after 1700, and later refugees from Baranja, and in the middle of the 19th century, Ruthenians. According to the population census from 1880, Mikluševci had 712 inhabitants, of which 467 were Greek Catholics, 227 Orthodox, 11 Roman Catholics and 7 Jews.

During the Croatian War of Independence, the Croatian Serb forces captured the village on 8 October 1991. Following the capture of the village, a family of three was killed by the Croatian Serb forces in the nearby Jelaš Forest, and 92 were expelled. A total of 35 persons were charged with the killings in 1996 by Croatian authorities in Osijek. By 2009, when the trial had concluded, eleven defendants died, and charges against ten were dropped. Twelve were convicted to prison sentences ranging from four to fifteen years and two were acquitted. Most of the defendants were tried in absentia—only three defendants were present at the sentencing.

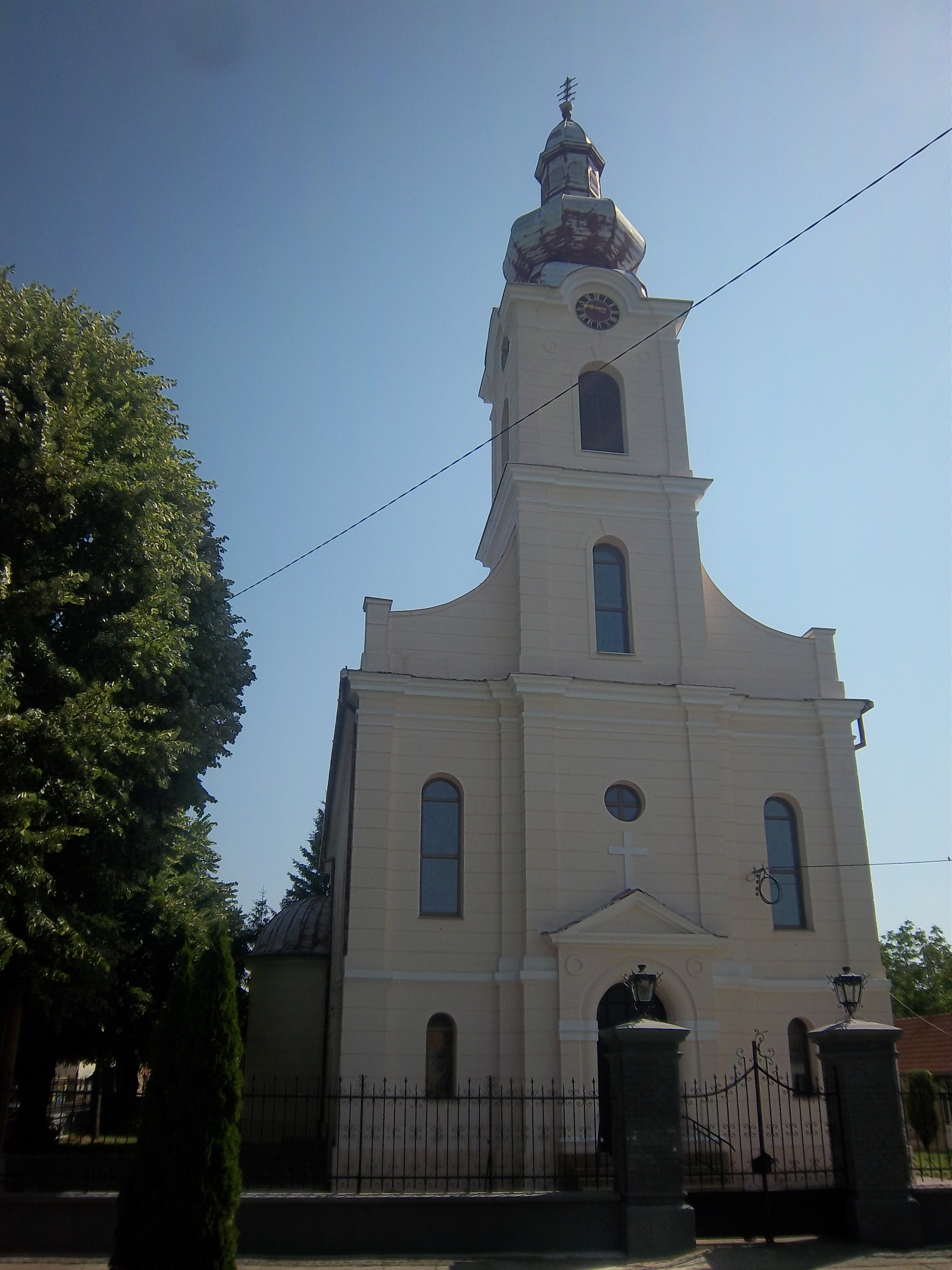
Greek Catholic Church of the Nativity of the Theotokos, Mikluševci

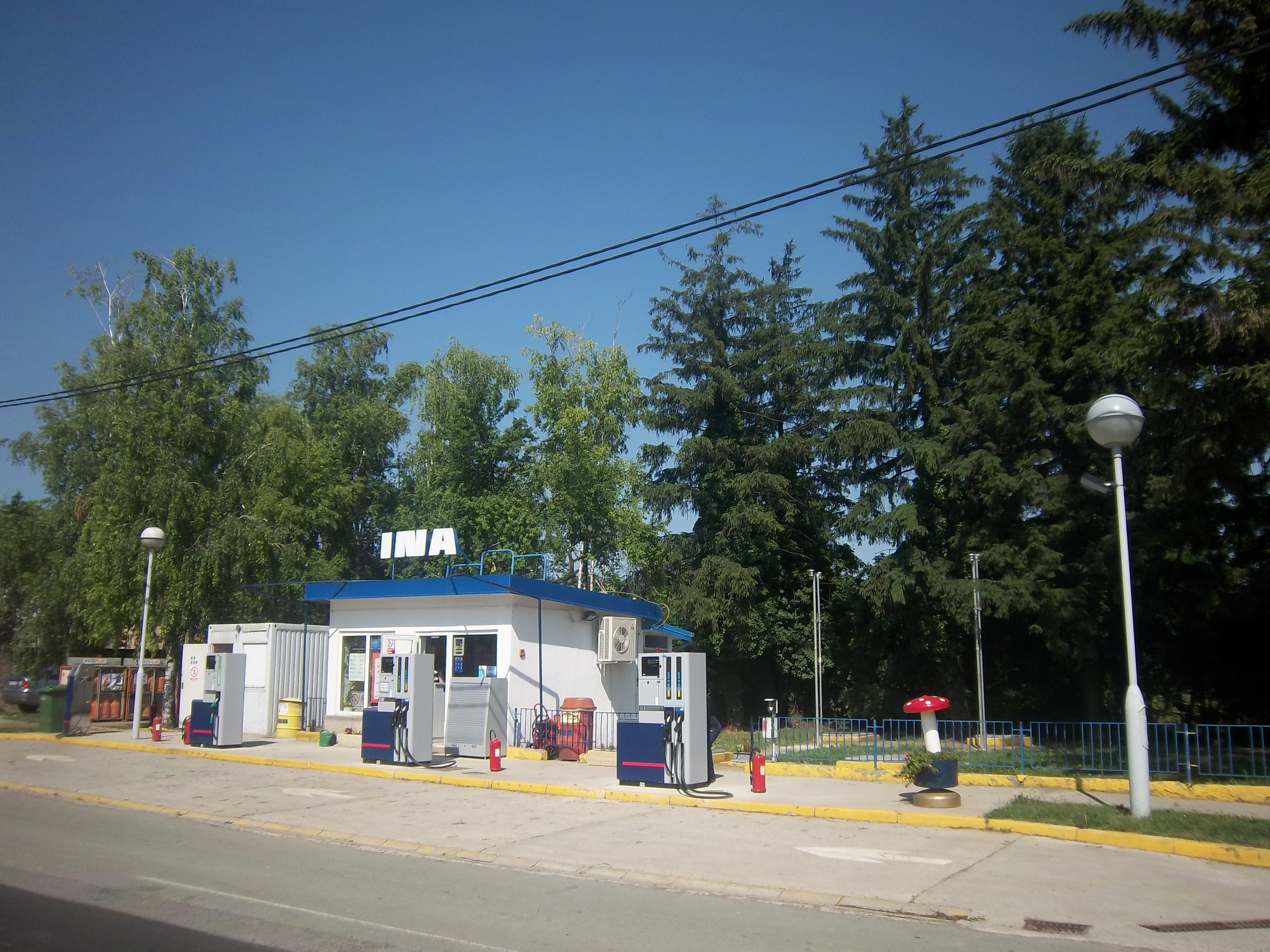
Oil station

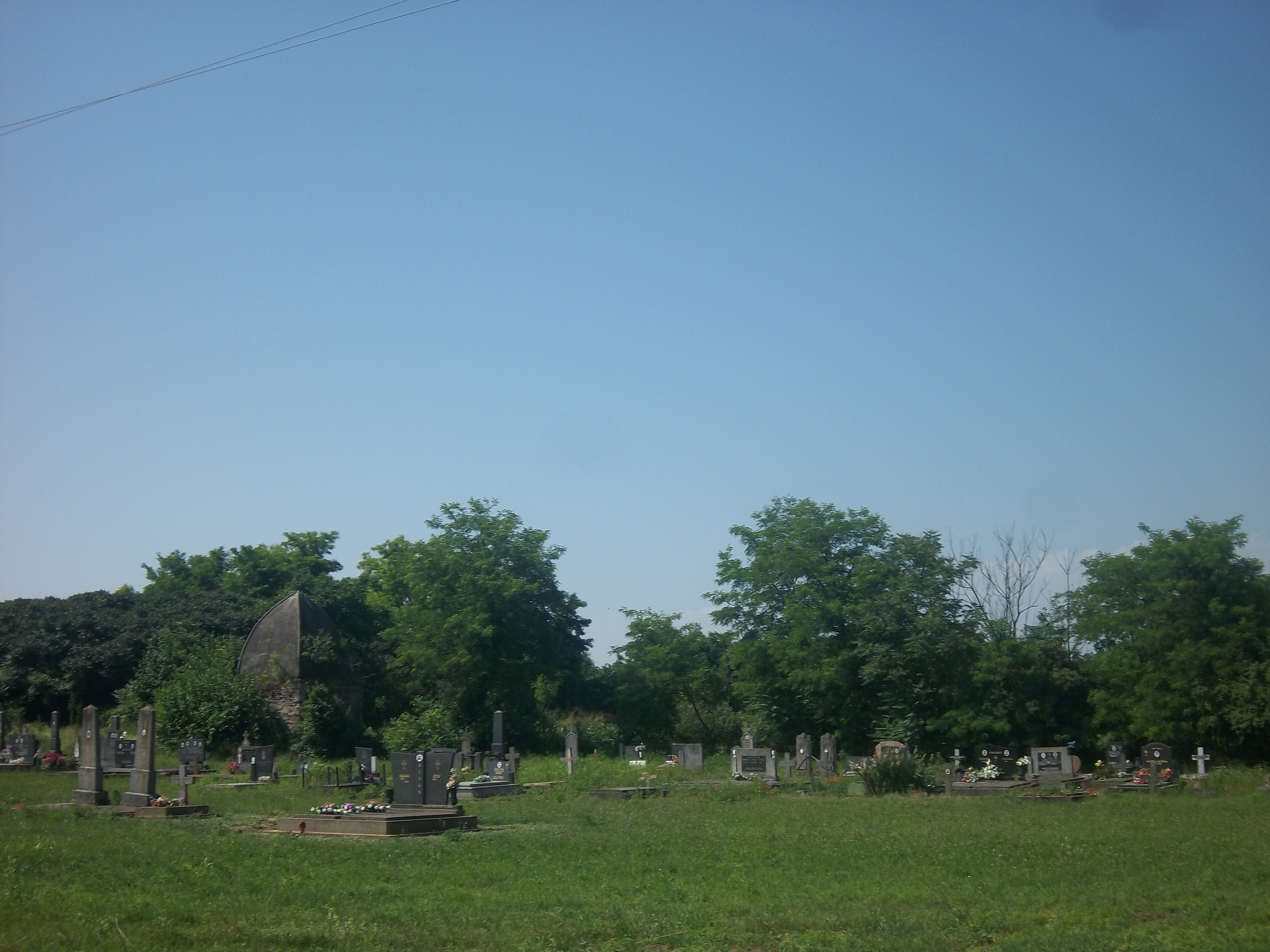
Eastern Orthodox Cemetery

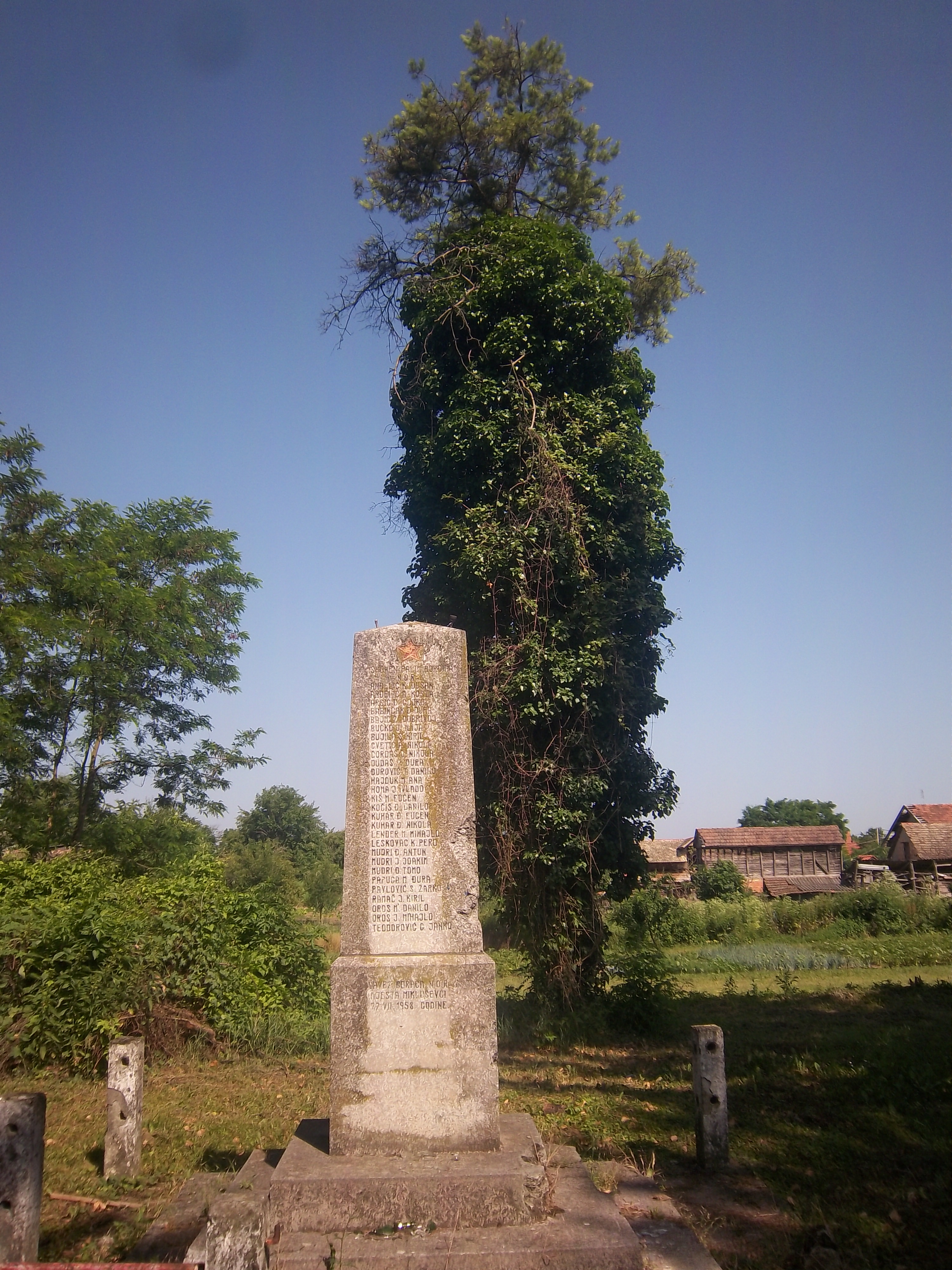
World War II monument

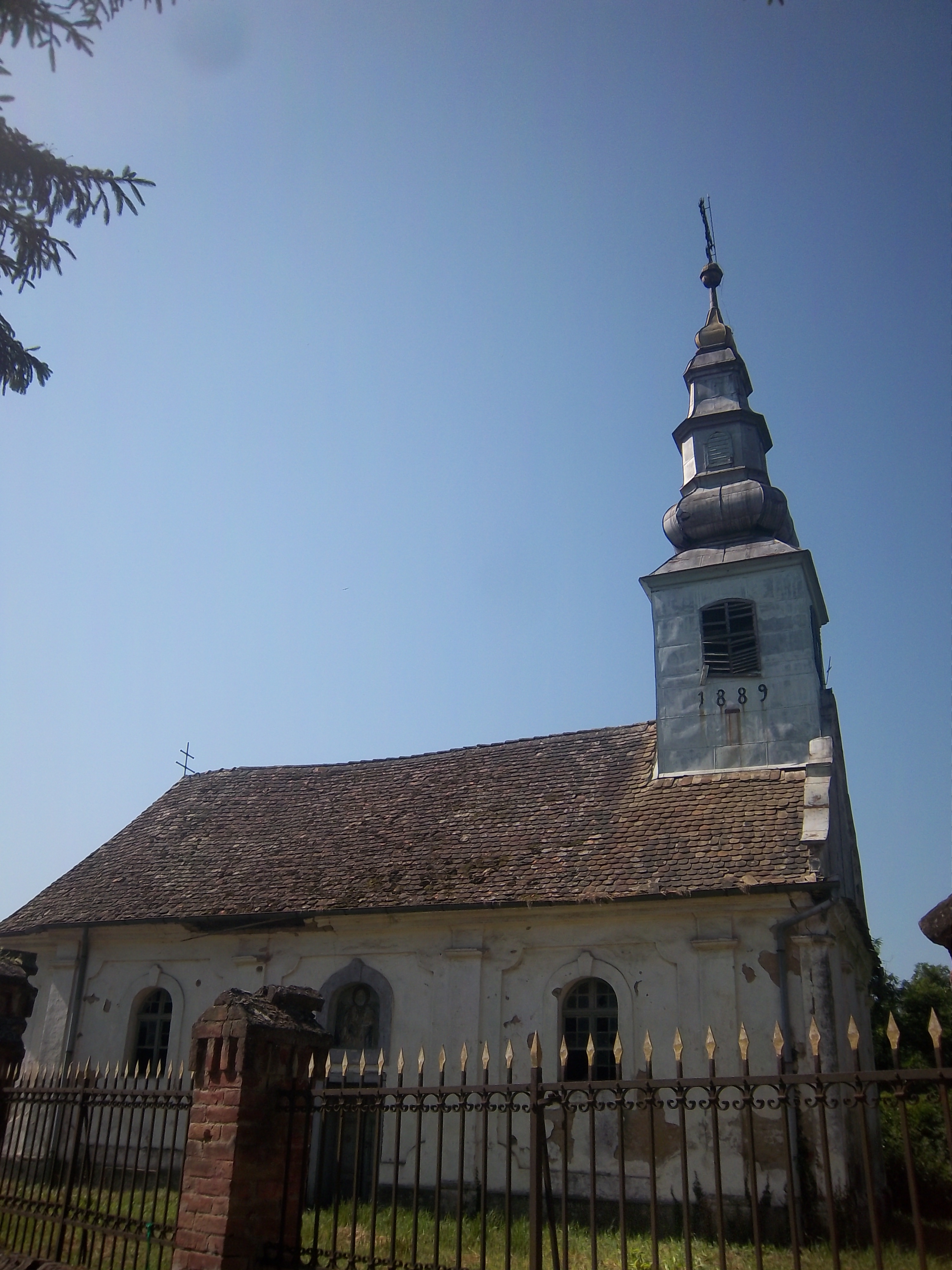
Serbian Orthodox Church of St. Nicholas, Mikluševci
