= Đulovac =

- Municipality
- Interactive map of Đulovac
- Location within Croatia
- Coordinates: 45°40′12″N 17°25′48″E
- Country: Croatia
- County: Bjelovar-Bilogora County

Government
  - Mayor: Andjelko Kolic (Independent)

Area
  - Municipality: 72.2 sq mi (187.0 km^{2})
  - Urban: 2.2 sq mi (5.7 km^{2})

Population (2021)
  - Municipality: 2,772
  - Density: 38.39/sq mi (14.82/km^{2})
  - Urban: 801
  - Urban density: 360/sq mi (140/km^{2})
- Time zone: UTC+1 (CET)
  - Summer (DST): UTC+2 (CEST)
- Postal code: 43500 Daruvar
- Website: djulovac.hr

Đulovac (Note: German: Wercke, Hungarian: Gjuloves, Gyula in Middle Ages, piror to 1991 Miokovićevo) (German: Wercke) is a settlement and a municipality in Slavonia, in the south of Bjelovar-Bilogora County in Croatia.

== History ==
In the late 19th and early 20th century, Đulovac was part of the Požega County of the Kingdom of Croatia-Slavonia.

== Demographics ==
According to the 2021 census, the population of the municipality was 2,772 with 801 living in the town proper. There were 3,640 inhabitants in 2001, 79.5% of which are Croats.

The municipality consists of the following 29 settlements:

- Bastajski Brđani, population 0
- Batinjani, population 193
- Batinjska Rijeka, population 29
- Borova Kosa, population 53
- Dobra Kuća, population 16
- Donja Vrijeska, population 50
- Donje Cjepidlake, population 7
- Đulovac, population 801
- Gornja Vrijeska, population 34
- Gornje Cjepidlake, population 30
- Katinac, population 101
- Koreničani, population 208
- Kravljak, population 18
- Mala Babina Gora, population 21
- Mala Klisa, population 0
- Mali Bastaji, population 111
- Mali Miletinac, population 14
- Maslenjača, population 138
- Nova Krivaja, population 69
- Potočani, population 30
- Puklica, population 102
- Removac, population 9
- Stara Krivaja, population 0
- Škodinovac, population 34
- Velika Babina Gora, population 31
- Velika Klisa, population 0
- Veliki Bastaji, population 532
- Veliki Miletinac, population 50
- Vukovije, population 91
Đulovac: Population trends 1857–2021
v

population	4065	5009	5236	7814	9040	10882	10372	11410	8073	8441	8336	7166	5551	4696	3640	3245	2772
	1857	1869	1880	1890	1900	1910	1921	1931	1948	1953	1961	1971	1981	1991	2001	2011	2021

Sources: Croatian Bureau of Statistics publications

== Politics ==
=== Minority councils and representatives ===
Directly elected minority councils and representatives are tasked with consulting tasks for the local or regional authorities in which they are advocating for minority rights and interests, integration into public life and participation in the management of local affairs. At the 2023 Croatian national minorities councils and representatives elections Serbs of Croatia fulfilled legal requirements to elect their own 10 members minority councils of the Municipality of Đulovac.
