= Berak =

- Village
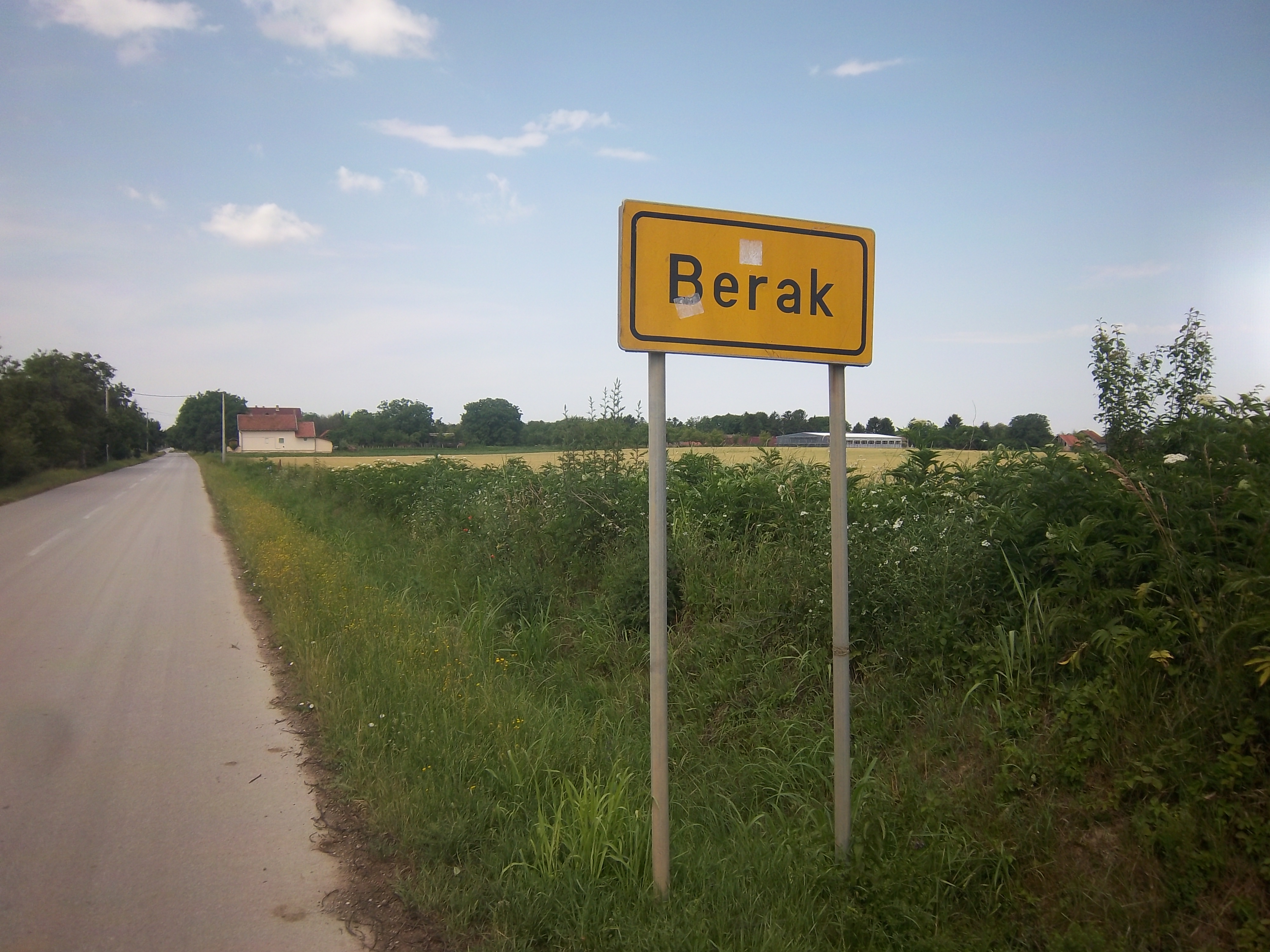

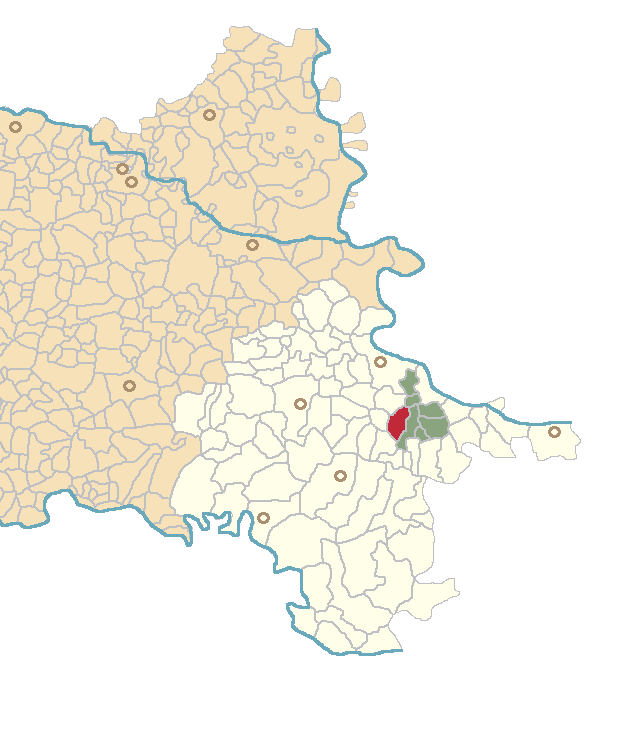

- Location in Croatia Berak (Croatia) Berak (Europe)
- Coordinates: 45°13′54″N 19°1′40″E
- Country: Croatia
- Region: Syrmia (Podunavlje)
- County: Vukovar-Syrmia
- Municipality: Tompojevci

Area
  - Total: 17.1 km^{2} (6.6 sq mi)

Population (2021)
  - Total: 277
  - Density: 16.2/km^{2} (42.0/sq mi)
- Time zone: UTC+1 (CET)
  - Summer (DST): CEST

Berak is a village in municipality of Tompojevci in eastern Croatia. Village is located 11 km from county seat Vukovar.

== History ==
First written records about Berak comes from 15th century when village was known under names Perecke and Perethe. Following Ottoman retreat from the region, the Lordship of Vukovar was established, and the village became part of its domain.

There is an ossuary from the period of World War II with the bones of Yugoslav Partisans and Italian resistance movement fighters from the time of Syrmian Front. Ossuary was built in 1966 and inscription on it state "For the eternal glory to the fallen fighters" together with the names of the famous fighters from the Republic of Serbia, the Republic of Croatia, Bosnia and Herzegovina, the Republic of Macedonia and the Republic of Italy.

It played a huge role in the Log Revolution during the breakup of Yugoslavia.

Serb forces captured and occupied Berak in September 1991. From September until December 1991, dozens of Croat civilians were killed by Serb forces, while others were tortured, raped and expelled from the village.
