= Church of St. Nicholas, Mikluševci =

Serbian Orthodox church in Mikluševci, Croatia

Coordinates: 45°15′03″N 19°05′02″E

Church of St. Nicholas
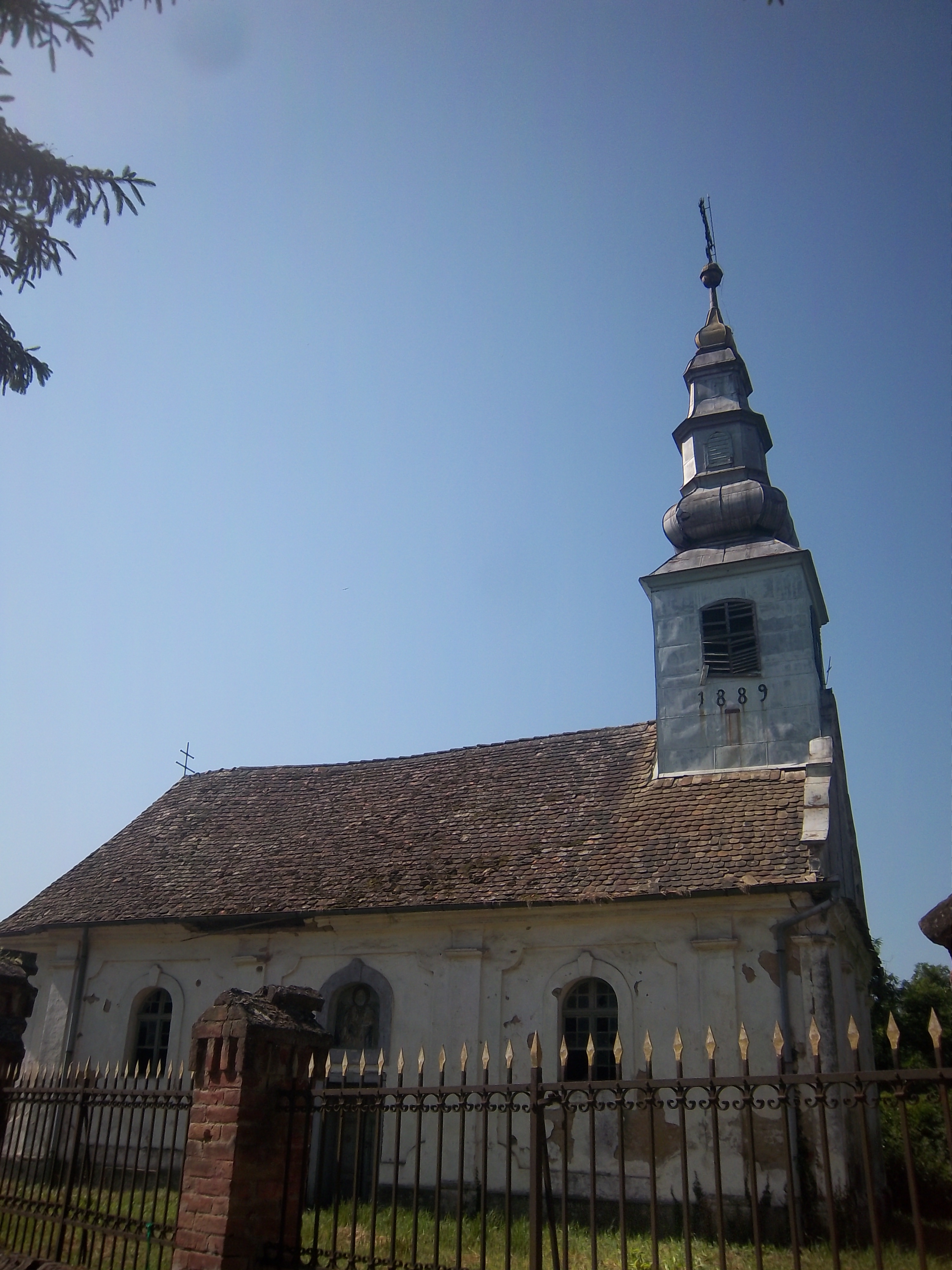
- Church of St. Nicholas
- Location: Mikluševci, Vukovar-Syrmia County
- Country: Croatia
- Denomination: Serbian Orthodox

History
- Status: Church
- Dedication: Saint Nicholas

Architecture
- Functional status: Active
- Style: Baroque
- Years built: 1758-1766

Administration
- Archdiocese: Eparchy of Osijek Plain and Baranya

Church of St. Nicholas (Serbian Cyrillic: Црква светог Николе, Croatian: Crkva svetog Nikole) in Mikluševci is Serbian Orthodox church in eastern Croatia. The church was constructed in period between 1758 and 1766 at the site of an earlier wooden Orthodox church which in 1756 served 31 Orthodox household in the village. This wooden church was dedicated to Saint Nicholas as well. From the 19th century onward the village was settled by Greek Catholic Pannonian Rusyns settlers from Carpathian Ruthenia which changed religious structure of the settlement. In 1880 out of 712 inhabitants 467 were Greek Catholic, 227 Eastern Orthodox, 11 Roman Catholic and 7 Jewish. Parrish Hall of the Church of St. Nicholas was destroyed two times in history, once during the World War II and in 1991 again during the Croatian War of Independence. Iconostasis, which is the main property of the Church of St. Nicholas, is since Croatian War of Independence kept and under restoration of Matica srpska in Novi Sad. Today the village of Mikluševci are not an independent Serbian Orthodox parish but are part of the Sotin parish.

== Iconostasis ==
The iconostasis in the Church of St. Nicholas was painted by Serb Baroque painter Lazar Serdanović in style of Teodor Kračun. Serdanović independently painted two iconostaisises in the Syrmia region with another one being the one in the Church of the Dormition of the Theotokos in nearby Negoslavci which was done earlier than Mikluševci's one but both at unknown time. He was also assistant during the iconostasis painting in the Church of St. Nicholas (1772–1776) in Vukovar. Iconostasis of the church is divided into five areas which together contain 66 icons which were inspired by chalcography from Biblia Ectypa (Pictorial Bible). During the Croatian War of Independence iconostasis was dismantled and taken to the Palace of the Patriarchate in Sremski Karlovci where it awaited urgent conservation and restoration due to its deteriorated state.

== See also ==
- List of Serbian Orthodox churches in Croatia
- Eparchy of Osijek Plain and Baranya
- Serbs of Croatia
