= Otok =

Otok can refer to:

== Bosnia and Herzegovina ==
- Otok, Ljubuški, a village in western Herzegovina

== Croatia ==
- Otok, Vukovar-Srijem County, a town in eastern Croatia
- Otok, Međimurje County, a village near Čakovec, northern Croatia
- Otok, Split-Dalmatia County, a village in southern Croatia
- Otok, Dubrovnik-Neretva County, a village in southern Croatia
- Otok Oštarijski, a village near Ogulin in western Croatia
- Otok na Dobri, a village near Bosiljevo in western Croatia

== Mongolia ==
- Otok (administrative unit), a feudal inheritance in medieval Mongolia

== Poland ==
- Otok, Pajęczno County, a village in Łódź Voivodeship, central Poland
- Otok, Poddębice County, a village in Łódź Voivodeship, central Poland
- Otok, Lower Silesian Voivodeship, a village in southwest Poland
- Otok, Pomeranian Voivodeship, a village in north Poland
- Otok, West Pomeranian Voivodeship, a village in northwest Poland

== Slovenia ==
- Otok, Cerknica, a village in Inner Carniola, Slovenia
- Otok, Metlika, a village in White Carniola, Slovenia

== See also ==
- Mali Otok
- Veliki Otok
- Otoka (disambiguation)
