= Privlaka, Vukovar-Syrmia County =

Privlaka
- Municipality
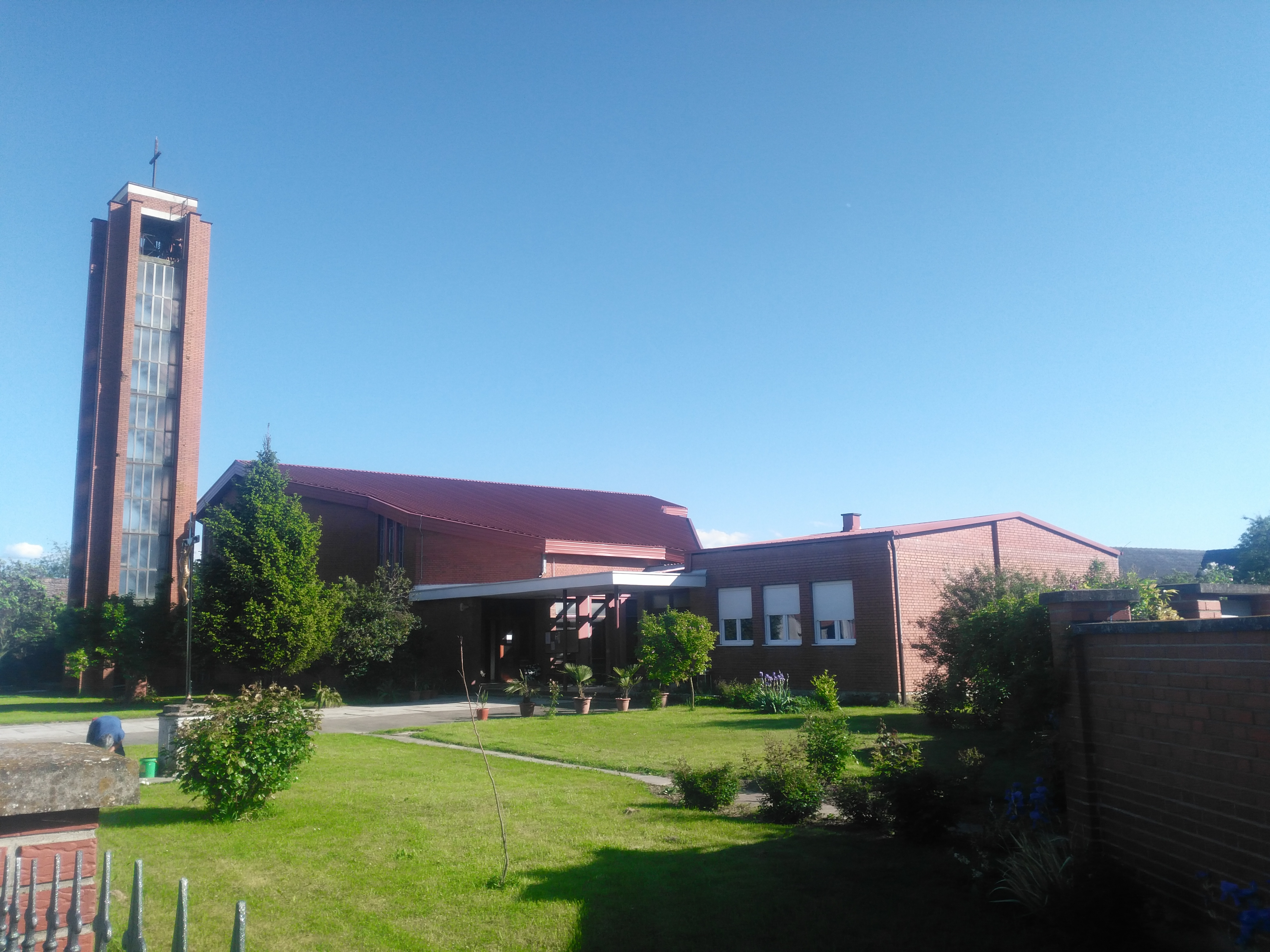
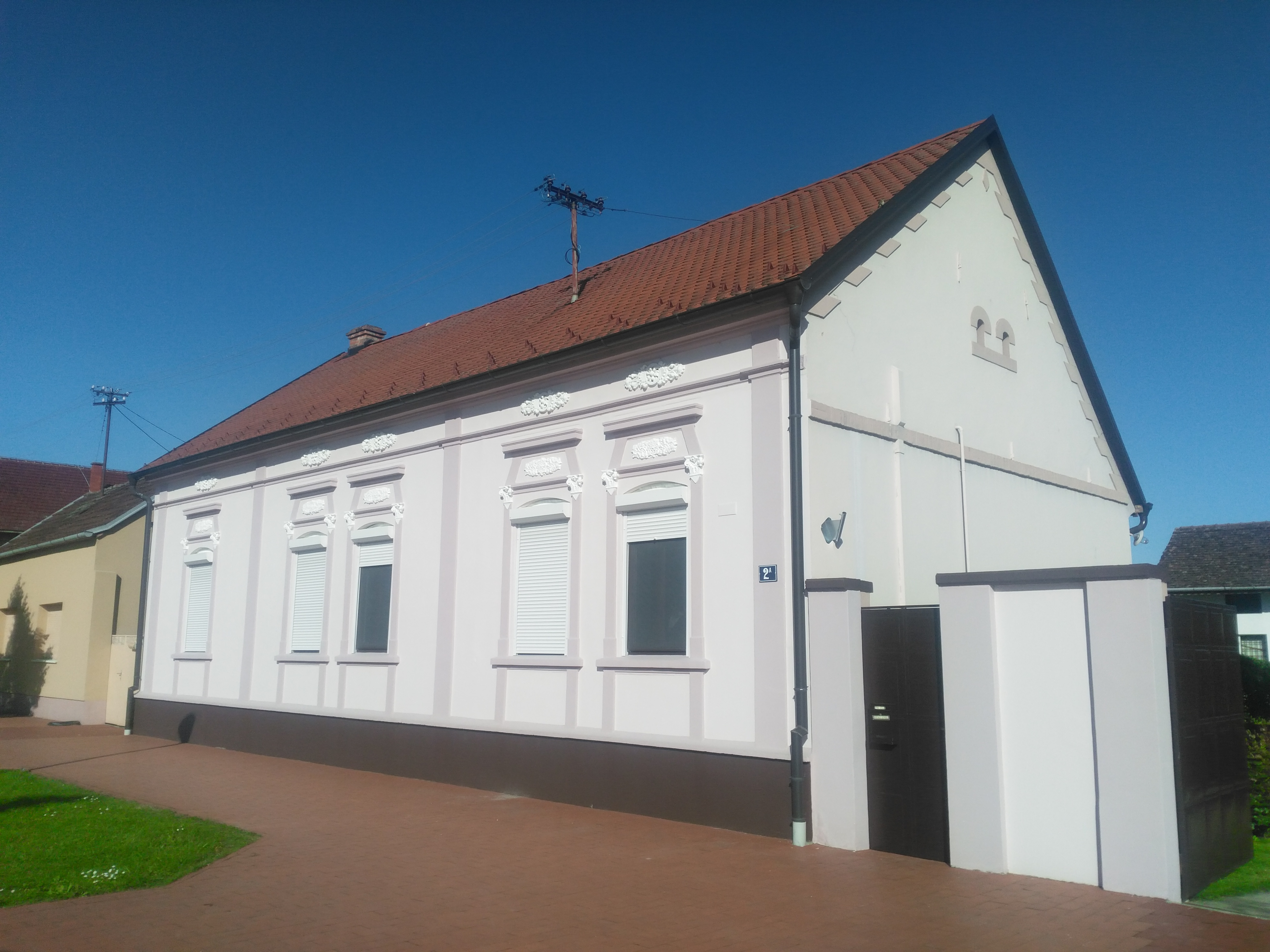
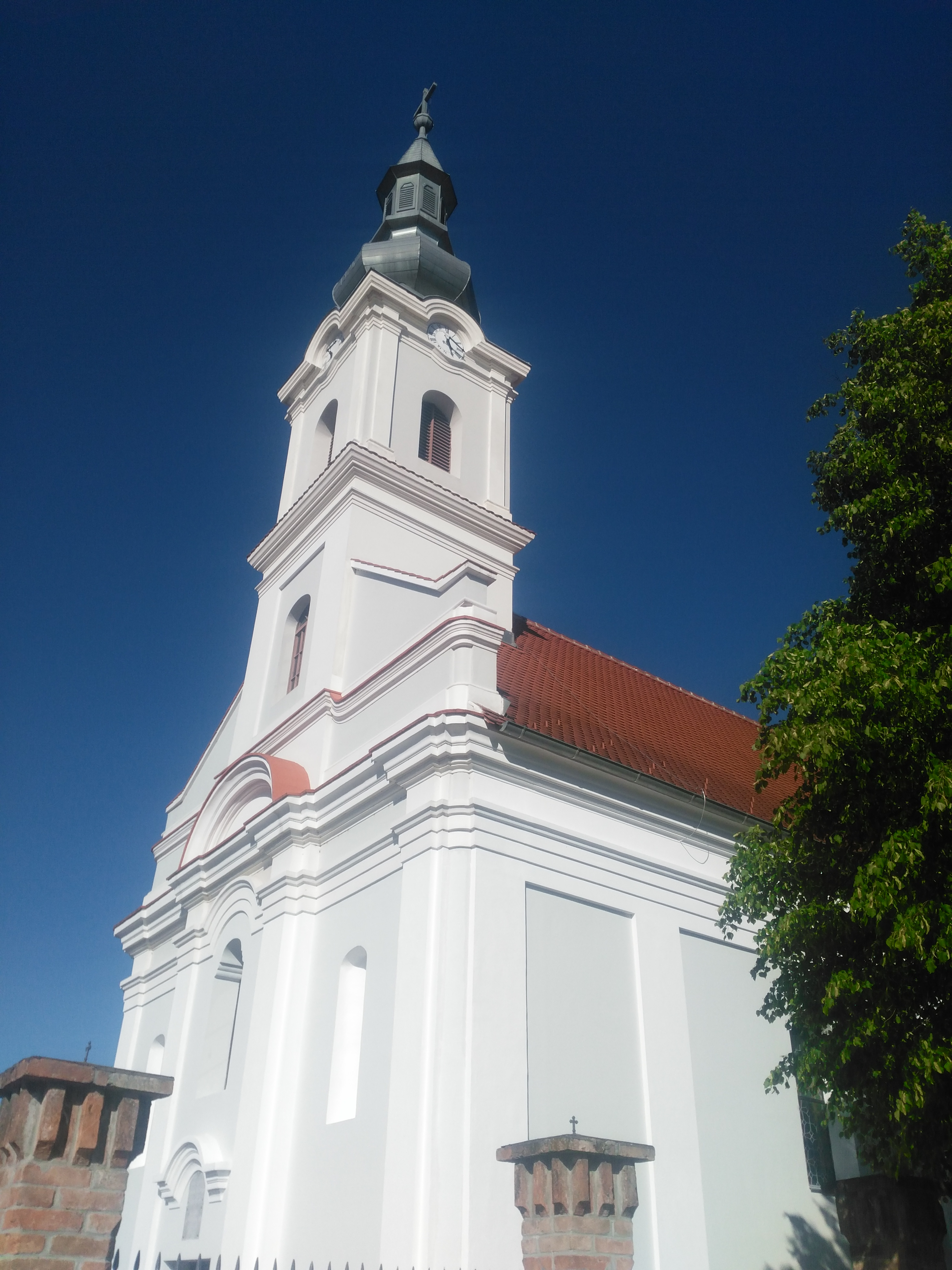
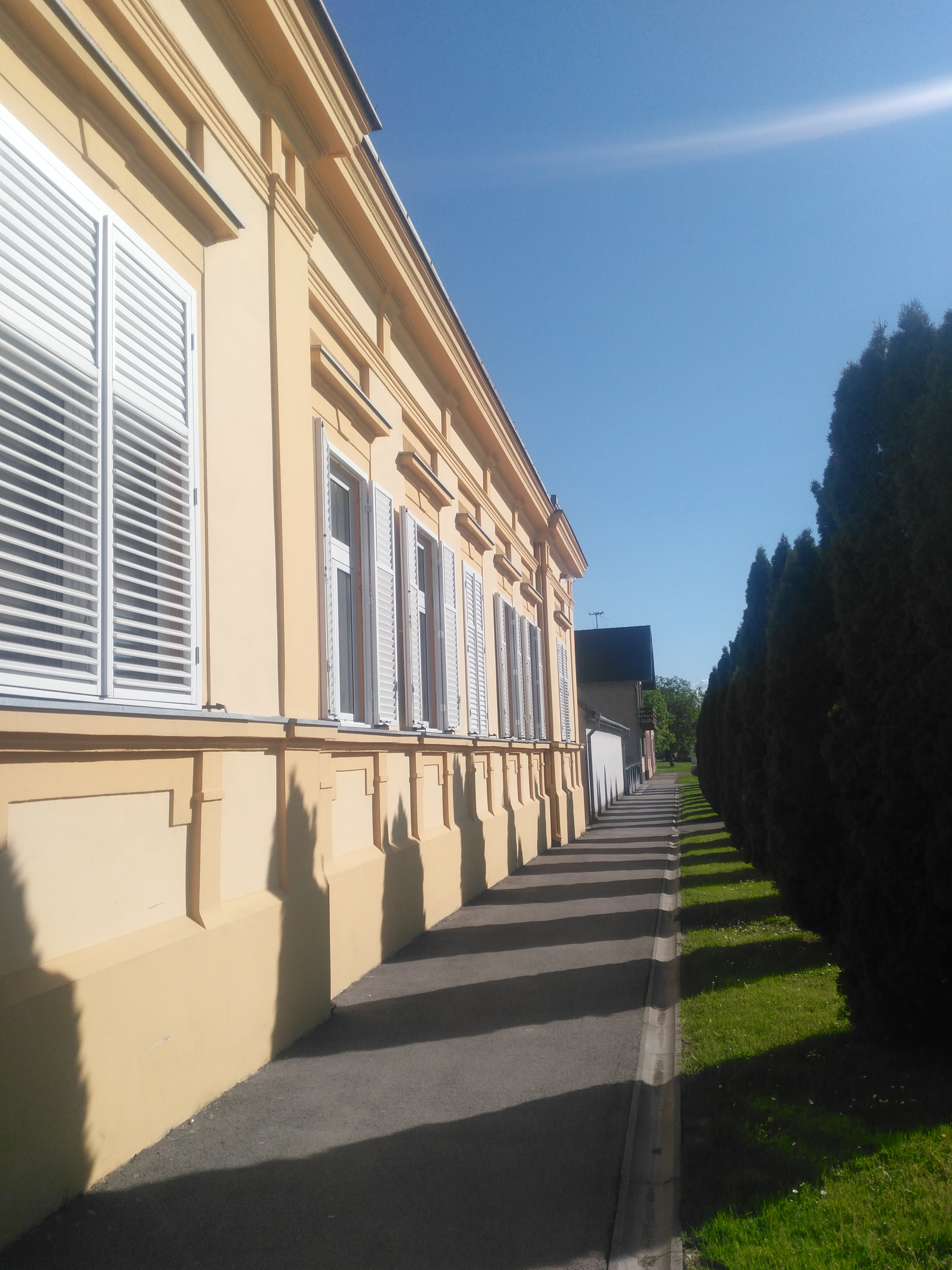
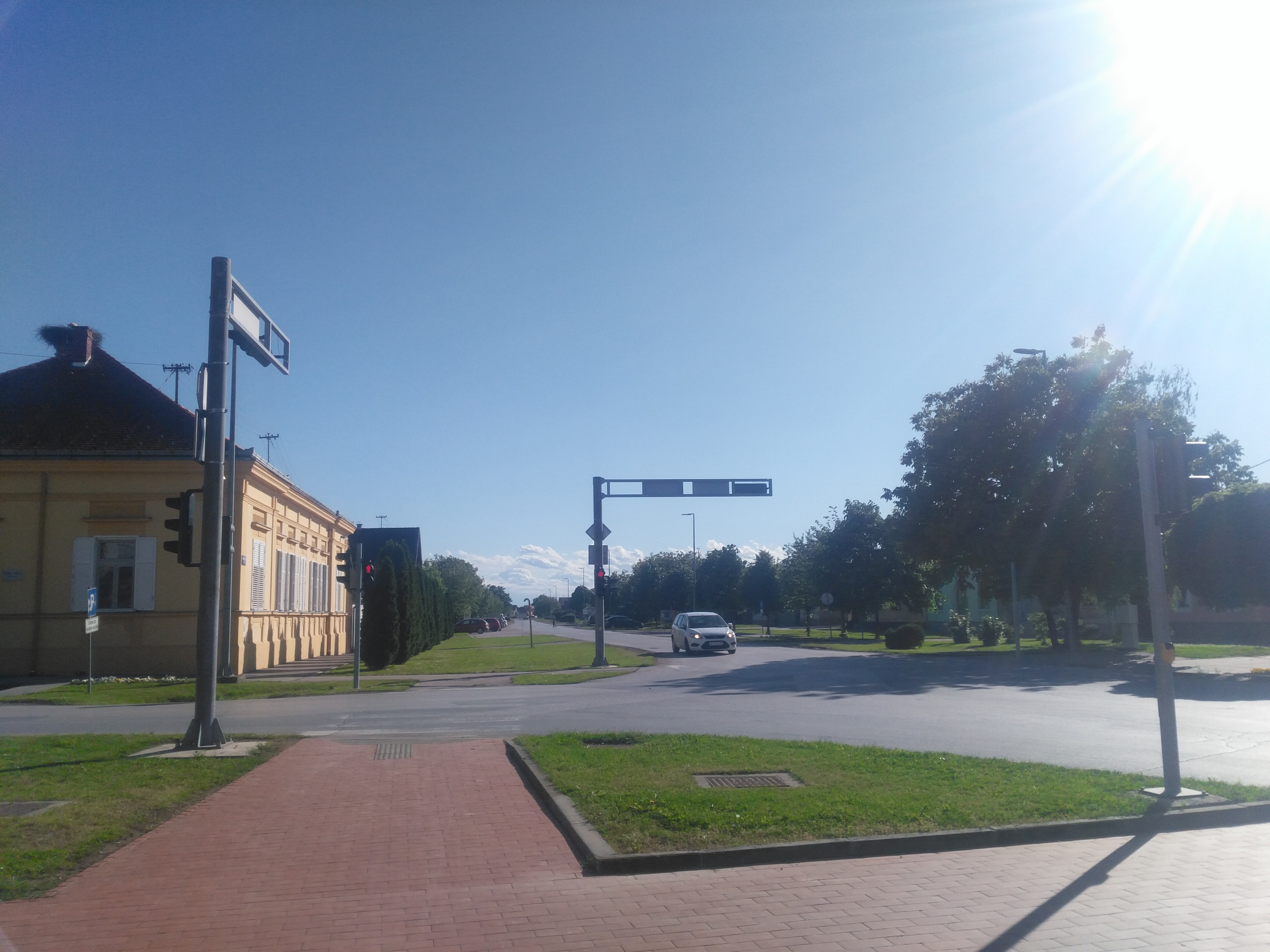
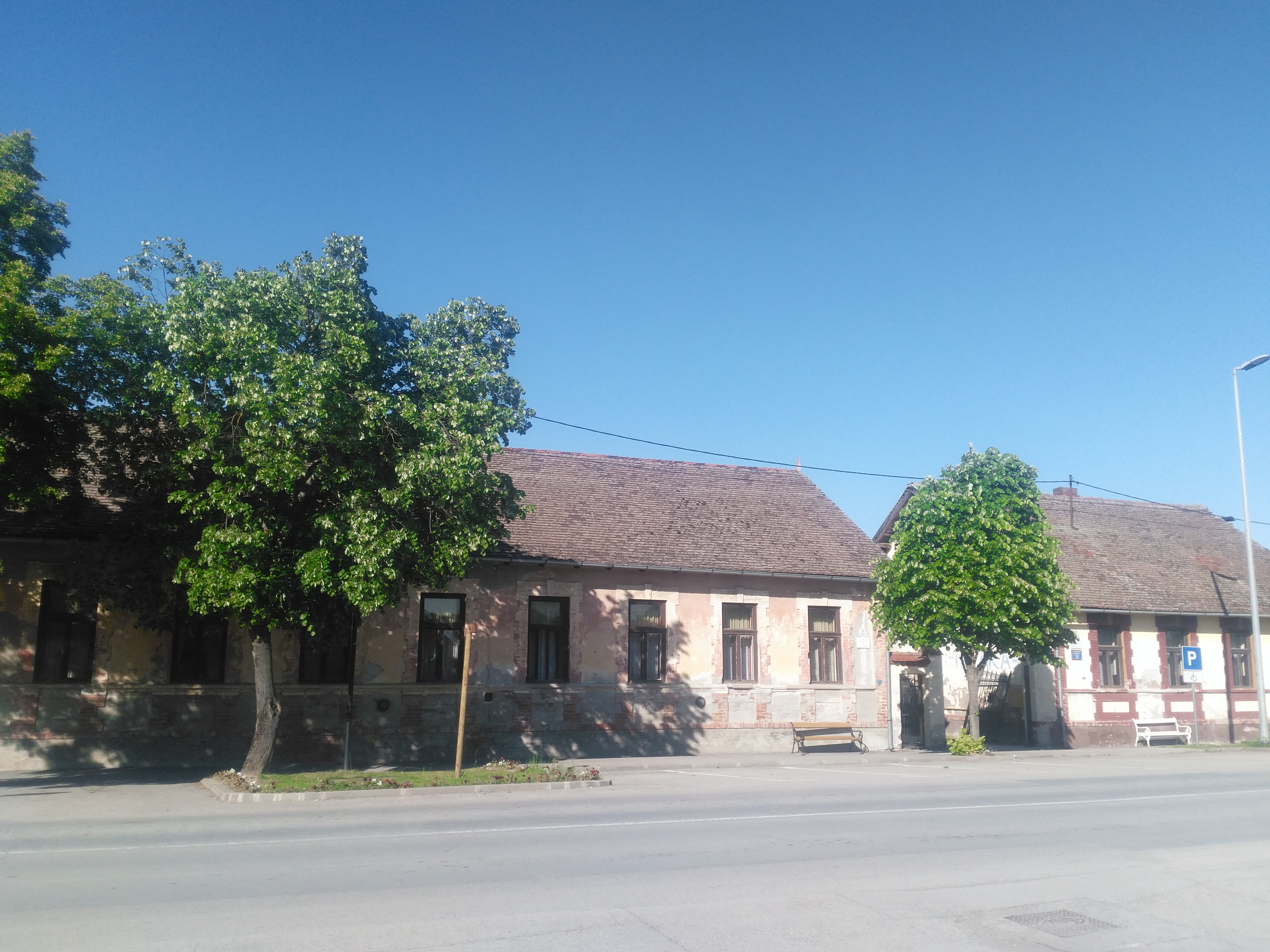

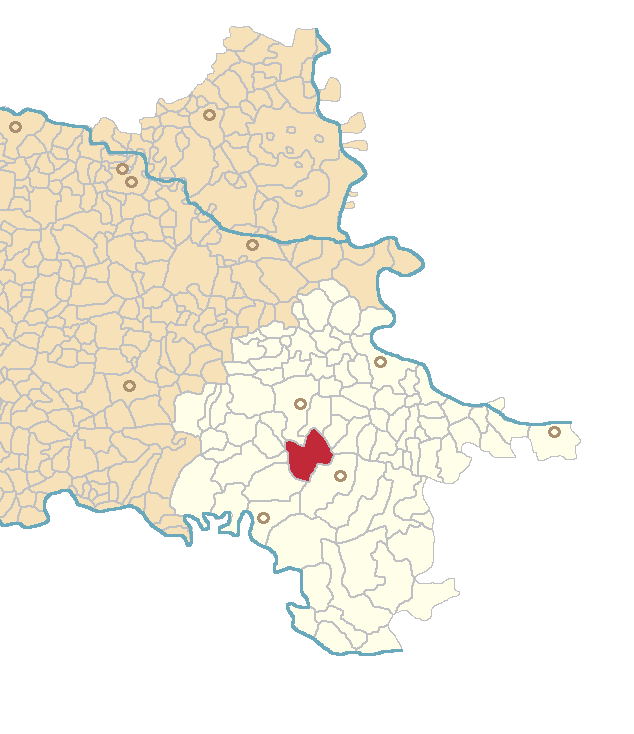

- Location of Privlaka in Croatia Privlaka (Croatia) Privlaka (Europe)
- Coordinates: 45.194339°N 18.837753°E
- Country: Croatia
- Region: Syrmia (Spačva basin)
- County: Vukovar-Syrmia County

Area
  - Municipality: 52.4 km^{2} (20.2 sq mi)
  - Urban: 52.4 km^{2} (20.2 sq mi)

Population (2021)
  - Municipality: 2,192
  - Density: 41.8/km^{2} (108/sq mi)
  - Urban: 2,192
  - Urban density: 41.8/km^{2} (108/sq mi)
- Vehicle registration: VK
- Website: opcina-privlaka.hr

Privlaka (Hungarian: Perlaka, German: Wrevilack) is a village in Croatia. It located in eastern Slavonia region, 12 km south of the town of Vinkovci. In the 2001 census, there were 3,776 inhabitants, of which 98.68% Croats. The settlement gained the status of a municipality at the time when nearby Otok gained the status of town. Otok kept Komletinci as a suburb while Privlaka was granted separate independent local municipal government.

== History ==
One Scordisci archaeological site in Privlaka dating back to late La Tène culture was excavated in the 1970s and 1980s as a part of rescue excavations in eastern Croatia. Archaeological site was a part of the settlement network of Scordisci in the area of Vinkovci.

In July 1943, during the World War II in Yugoslavia, Nazi forces destroyed agricultural machinery, including threshers, across several villages, including Privlaka.
