= Otoka =

Otoka may refer to:

- Otoka, Krupa na Uni, a village in Republika Srpska, Bosnia and Herzegovina
- Otoka, Sarajevo, a neighbourhood of Novi Grad, Sarajevo, Bosnia and Herzegovina
- Bosanska Otoka, a village in Una-Sana Canton, Bosnia and Herzegovina
- Otoka, Poland, a village in Gmina Łoniów, Świętokrzyskie Voivodeship, Poland

== See also ==
- Otok (disambiguation)
