= List of cities and towns in Croatia =

Cities that are seats of Croatian counties

An urbanized area in Croatia can gain the status of grad (which can be translated as town or city as there is no distinction between the two terms in Croatian) if it meets one of the following requirements:

1. is the center of a county (županija), or
2. has more than 10,000 residents, or
3. is defined by an exception (where the necessary historical, economic or geographic reasons exist)

A city (town) represents an urban, historical, natural, economic and social whole. The suburbs comprising an economic and social whole with the city, connected with it by daily migration movements and daily needs of the population of local significance, may also be included into the composition of a city as unit of local self-government.

Grad (city/town) is the local administrative equivalent of općina (translated as "municipality"), with the only distinction being that the former usually comprise urban areas whereas the latter commonly consist of a group of villages. Both municipalities and city/towns often comprise more than one settlement, as the administrative territory of a grad may include suburban villages or hamlets near the city/town in question. Settlements (naselja) are the third-level spatial units of Croatia, and the smallest unit for which the decennial census data are published by the Croatian Bureau of Statistics but are not administrative entities, i.e. they are governed by the municipal or city/town council of the local administrative unit they belong to.

Croatian cities are administratively subdivided into "city districts" (gradski kotari/gradske četvrti) and/or "local committees" (mjesni odbori) with elected councils. The City of Zagreb, as the capital, not being part of any county, is subdivided into both city districts and local committees.

- In December 1992 there were 70 cities and towns and 419 municipalities in Croatia organized into 20 counties (plus the city of Zagreb which is both a city and a county).
- In 2001 there were 122 cities and towns (excluding Zagreb) and 423 municipalities. This was the territorial division used for the 2001 census.
- In 2006 a revision was made, which listed a total of 127 cities and towns and 429 municipalities in Croatia. This division was used for the 2011 census.
- In 2013 the municipality of Popovača was upgraded to town, bringing the total to 128 cities and towns and 428 municipalities.

According to the Constitution, the city of Zagreb, as the capital of Croatia, has a special status. As such, Zagreb performs self-governing public affairs of both city and county.

== Tasks and organization ==
Cities (in English these would be called "towns"), within their self-governing scope of activities, perform the tasks of local significance, which directly fulfil the citizens' needs, and which were not assigned to the state bodies by the Constitution or law, particularly the tasks referring to urban design of settlements and dwelling, zoning and urban planning, communal activities, child care, social welfare, primary health care, personality development and primary education, culture, physical culture and sports, consumers protection, protection and improvement of the natural environment, fire and civil defence, local transport.

"Big cities" ("big city" is a Croatian legal term, in English these would be just "cities"), i.e. cities with more than 35,000 inhabitants that are also economic, financial, cultural, public health, scientific or traffic centres and cities that are county seats, in addition to these tasks, are also responsible for tasks regarding public roads maintenance and issuing of building and location permits.

=== City government ===
City council (Gradsko vijeće) is the representative body of citizens and the body of local self-government. The councillors are elected for a four-year term on the basis of universal suffrage in direct elections by secret ballot using proportional system with d'Hondt method. The executive head of the city is the mayor (gradonačelnik), also elected in direct elections by majoritarian vote (two-round system) for a four-year term (together with one or two deputy mayors). The mayor (with the deputy mayor/s) can be recalled by a referendum. City administrative departments and services manage administrative procedures in their areas of jurisdiction. The mayor names heads (principals) of the departments and services, who are chosen on the basis of a public competition.

== List of cities and towns ==
The following is a complete list of all officially designated 128 cities/towns in Croatia, sorted by population according to the 2021 population census. At the time of the 2001 census, there had been 123 cities/towns in the country and four former municipalities were administratively upgraded to towns prior to the 2011 census: Vodnjan (in 2003), Kutjevo, Otok, and Sveta Nedelja (in 2006). In addition, the table includes data for Popovača, also a former municipality which was re-designated as town in the administrative revision in April 2013.

The Municipal column in the table lists total population within the geographical boundary of the local administrative subdivision. This means that the figure often includes other smaller settlements such as villages or hamlets located on the outskirts or near the city/town proper. In contrast, the Town/City proper column lists only population of the city/town proper, without the smaller settlements which administratively belong to the city. Both numbers are given as in some cases the figures may vary dramatically (for example Velika Gorica with nearby settlements has a population of around 61,000 but the town proper has only 30,000 residents).

The town of Kaštela is a unique exception in that it only exists as an administrative unit - it is legally treated as an agglomeration of seven separate settlements with populations ranging from 3,000 to 7,000, none of which is actually called "Kaštela". Its town council is located in Kaštel Sućurac.

Another set of exceptions arises from the special status of the City of Zagreb, which is considered both a county and a city, and is further subdivided into city districts, local committees and settlements. Unlike its other districts, the district of Sesvete still has the status of a standalone settlement with a population of about 55,000. This would make it a large city in itself, but it does not have the administrative status of a city.

¤ County seat. There is a total of 21 counties of Croatia but only 20 county seats - the capital Zagreb doubles as a county (called City of Zagreb or Grad Zagreb) and the seat of the separate Zagreb County (Zagrebačka županija) which surrounds Zagreb but does not actually include the capital city.

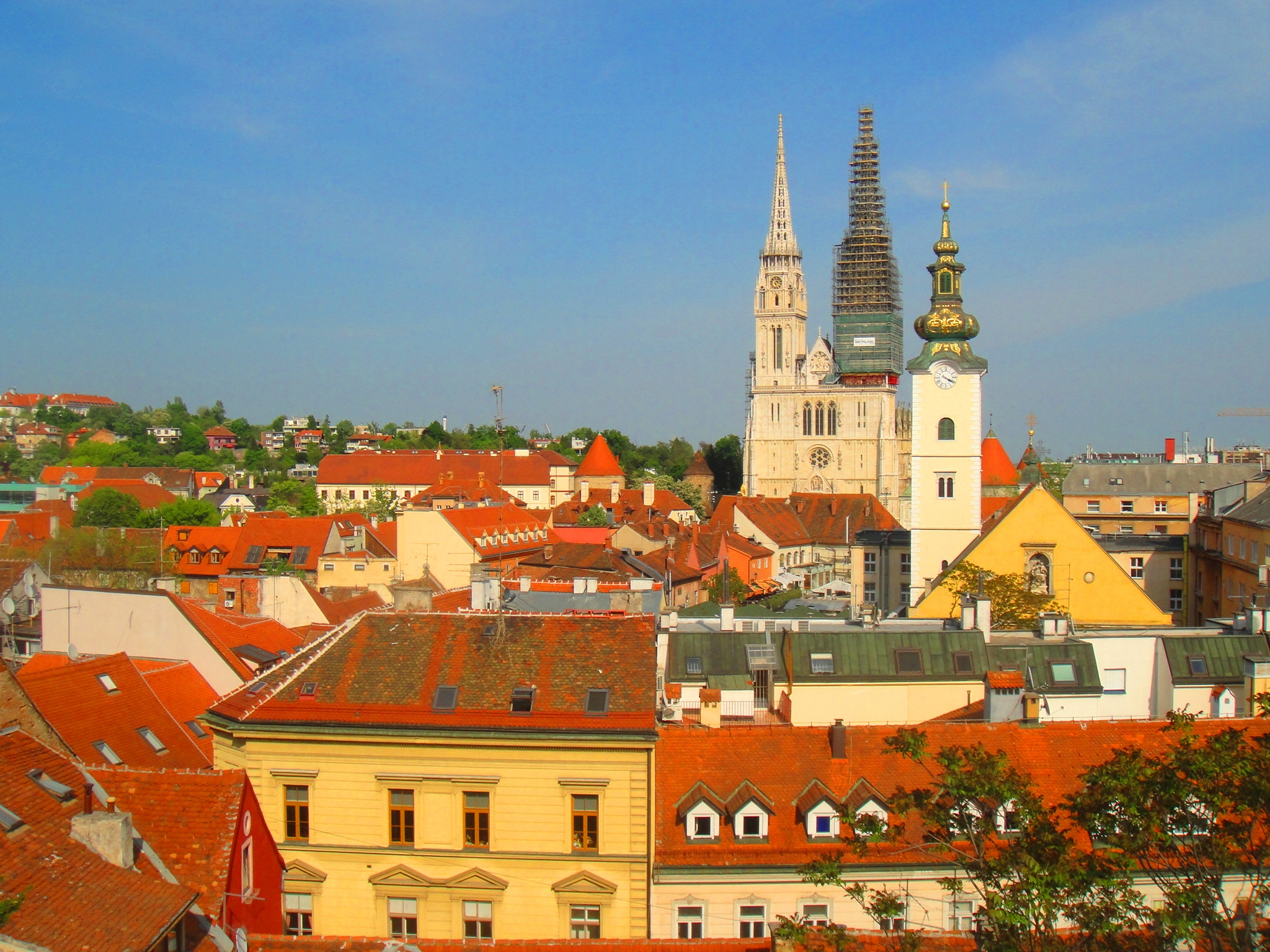
#1 Zagreb

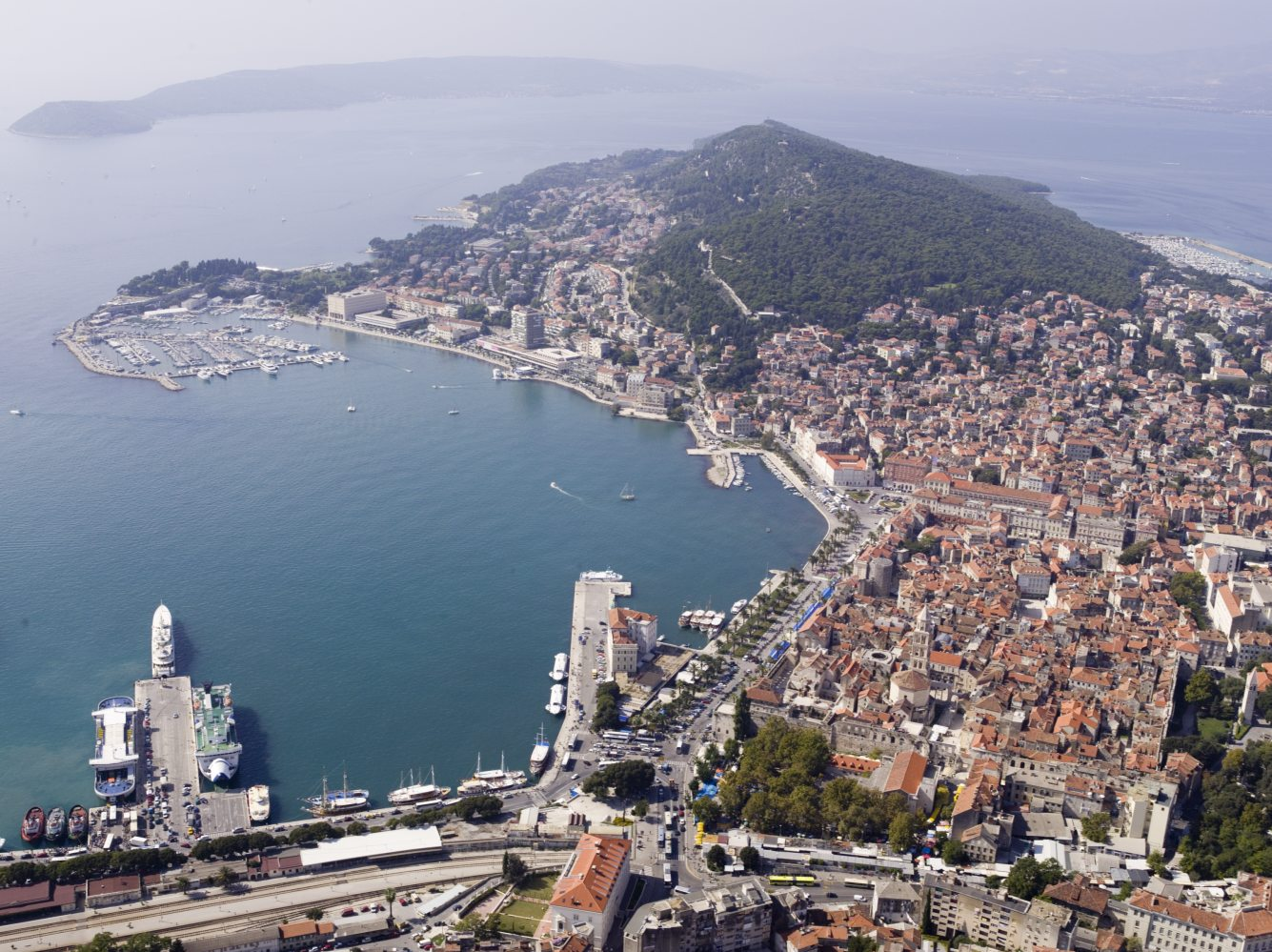
#2 Split

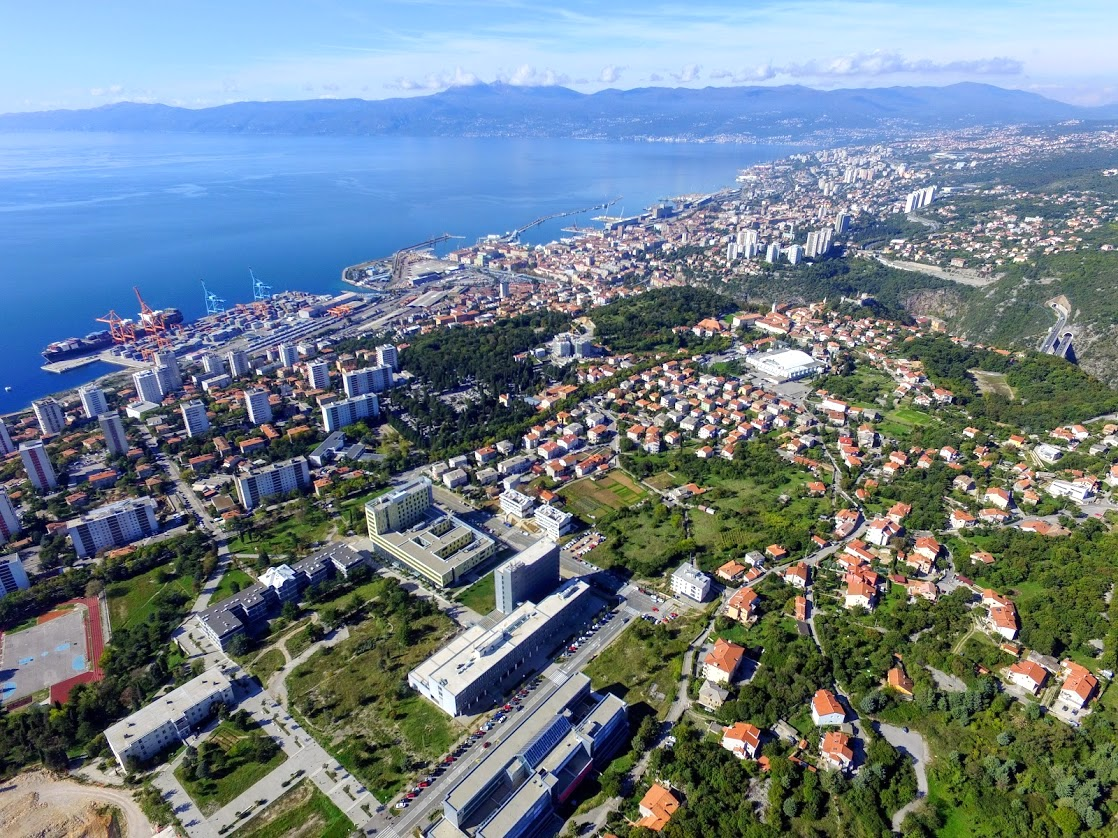
#3 Rijeka

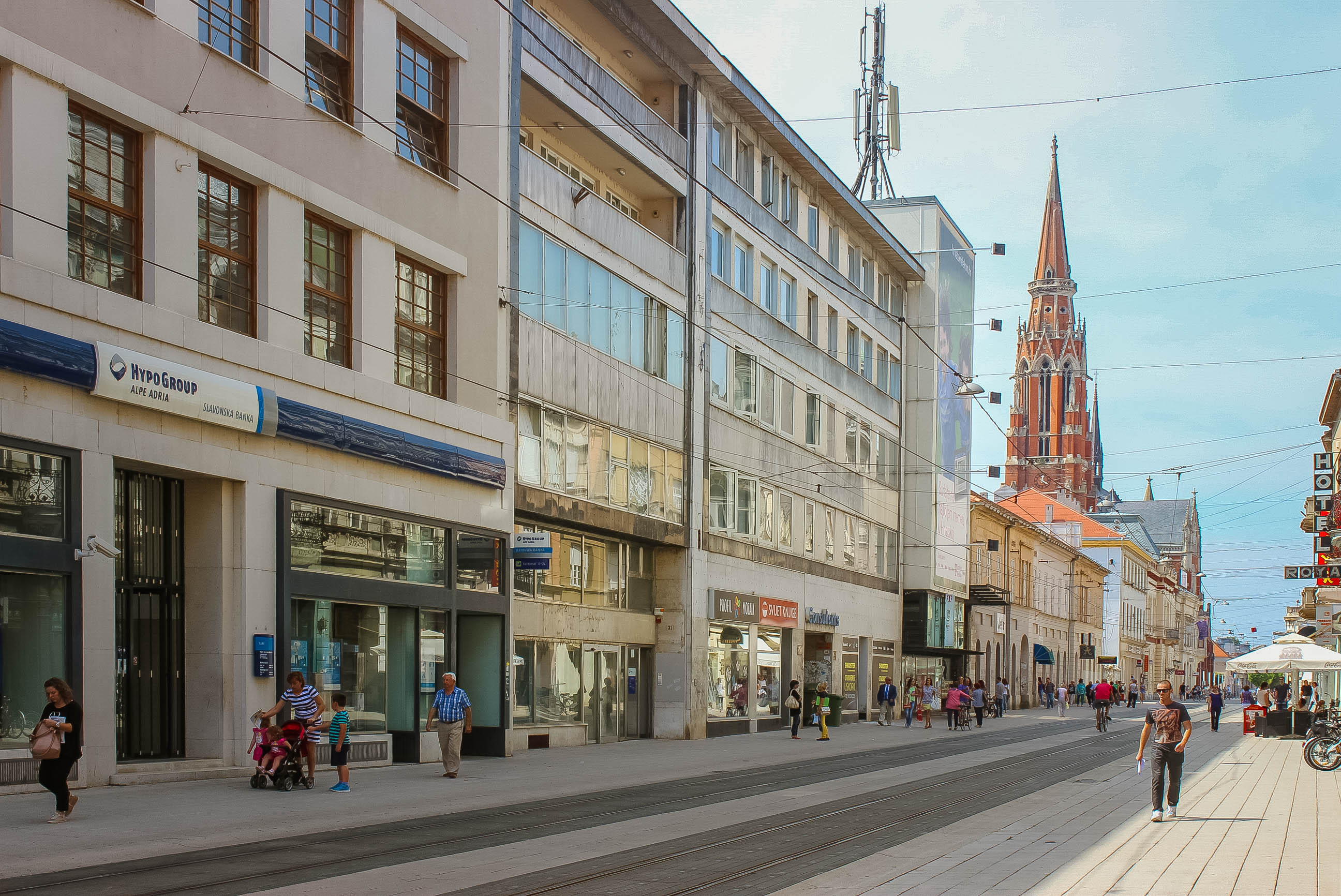
#4 Osijek

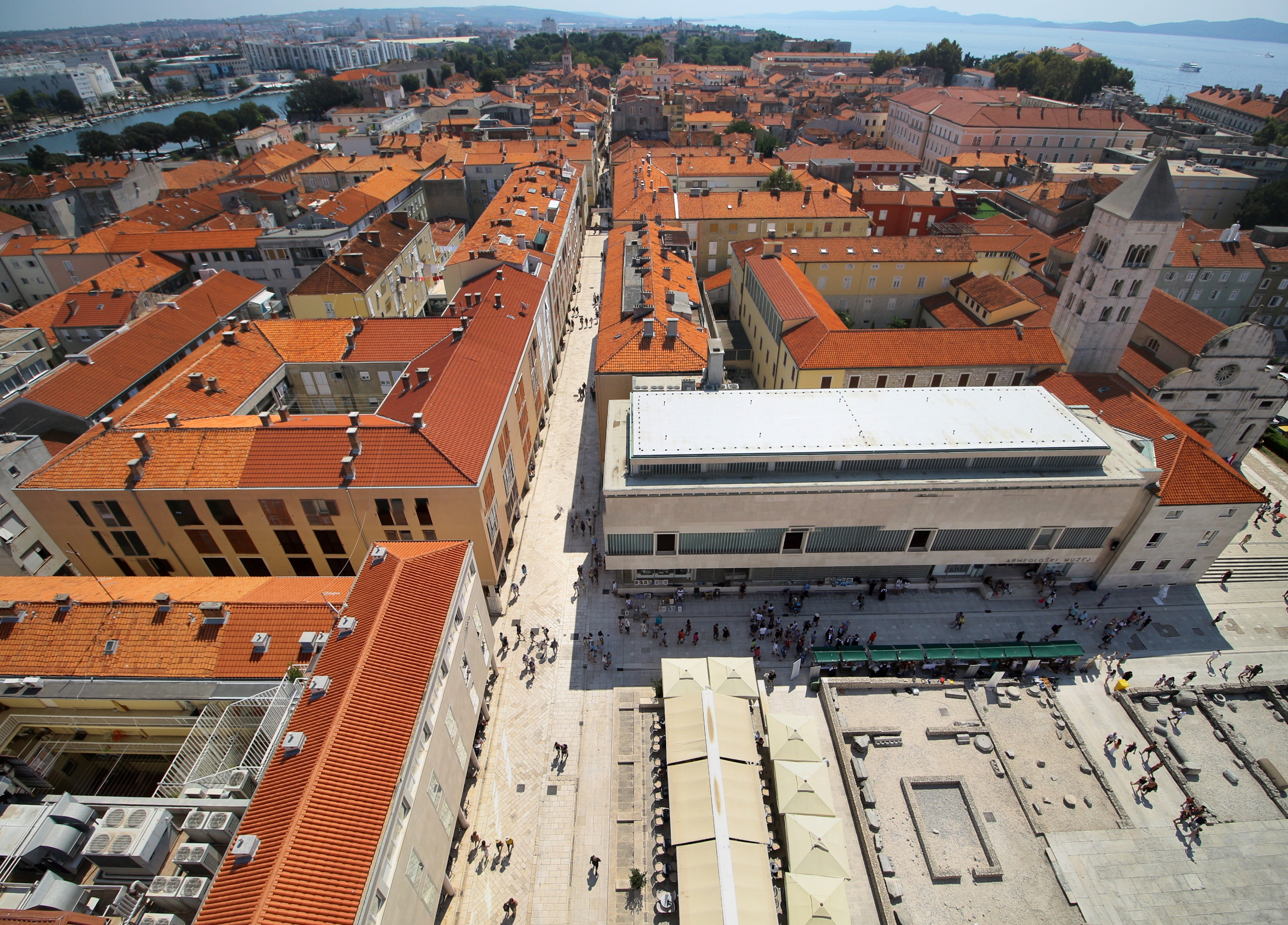
#5 Zadar

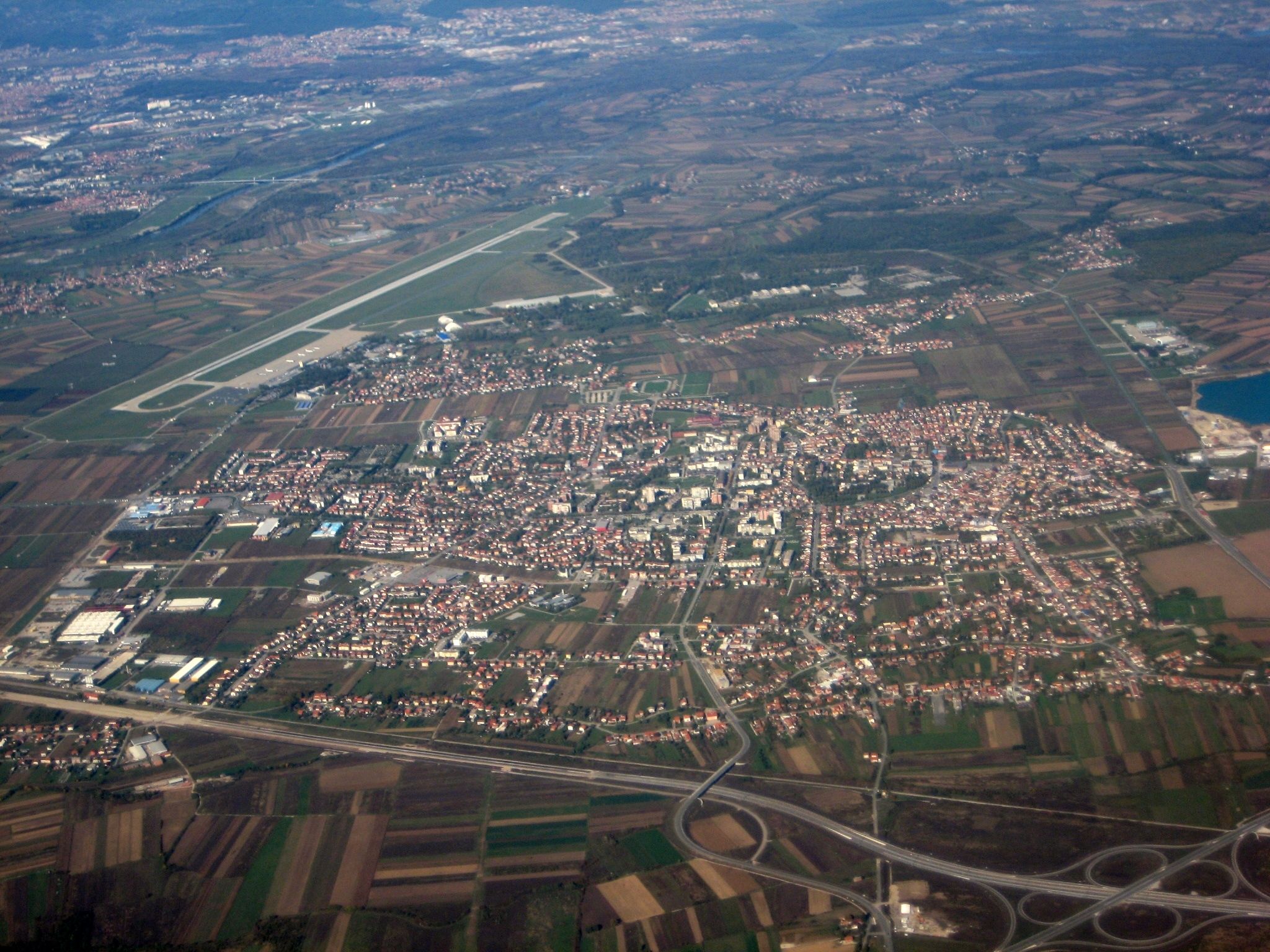
#6 Velika Gorica

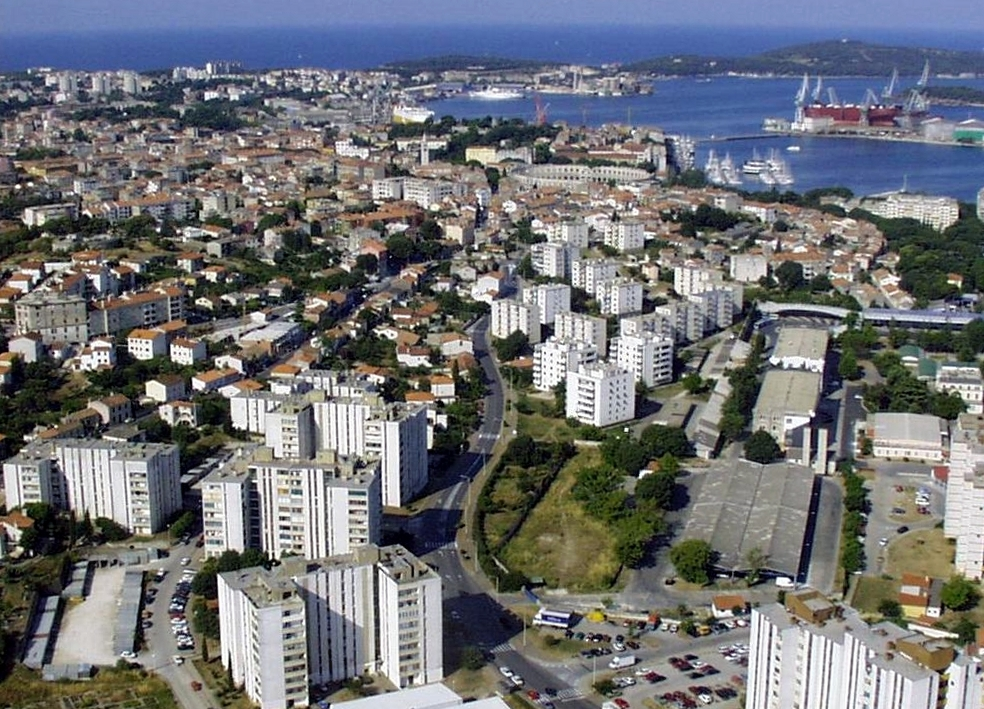
#7 Pula

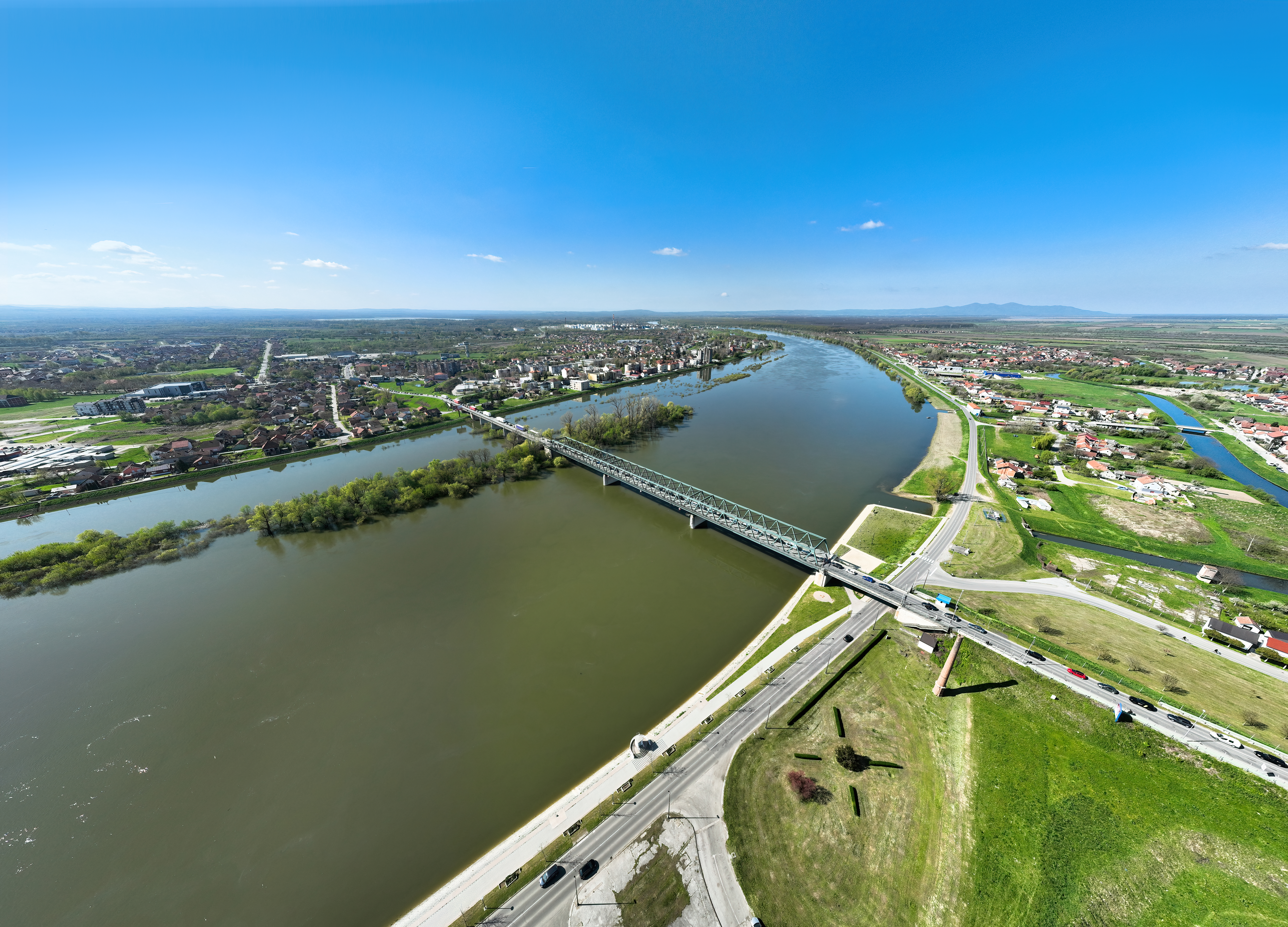
#8 Slavonski Brod

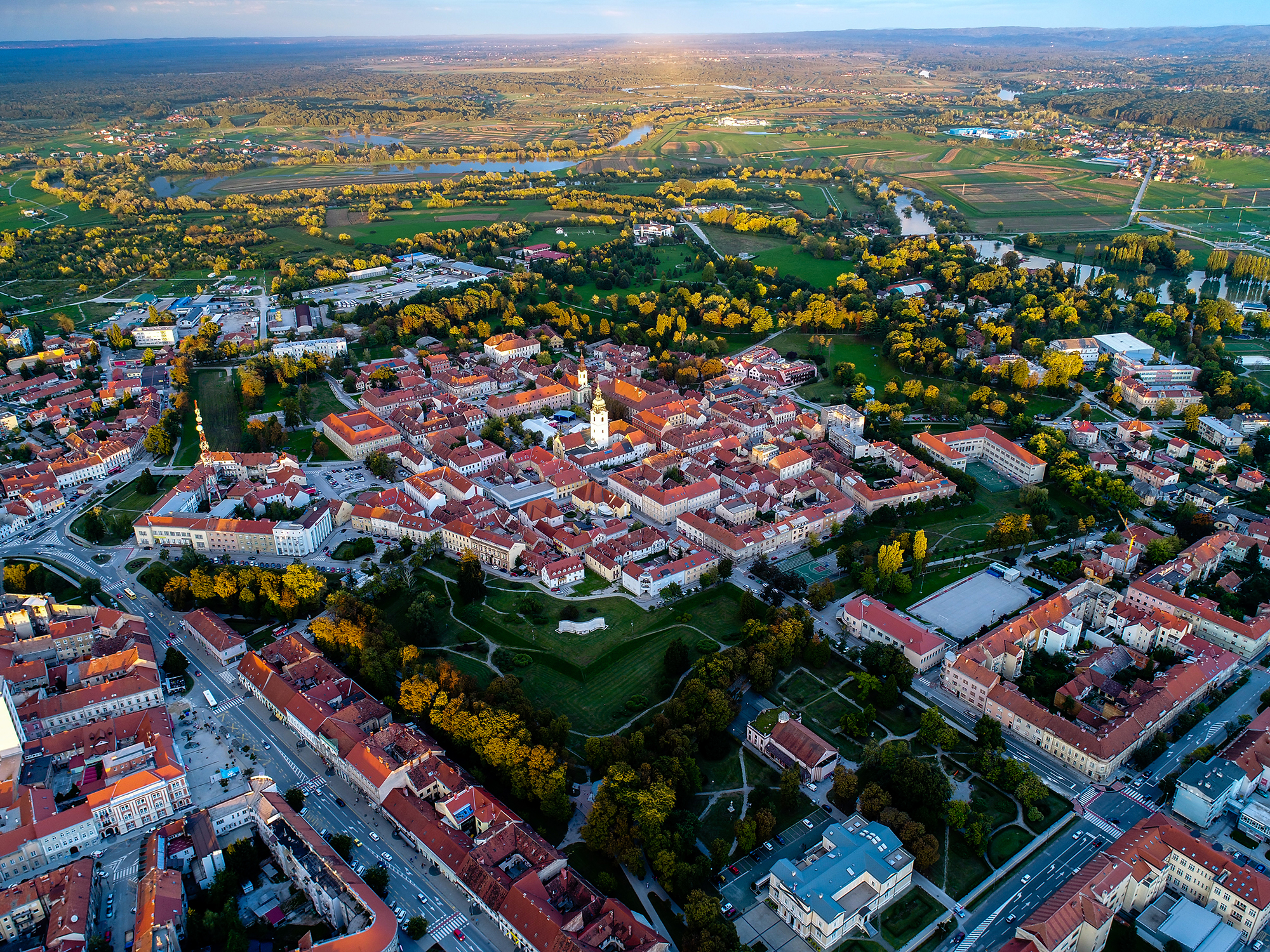
#9 Karlovac

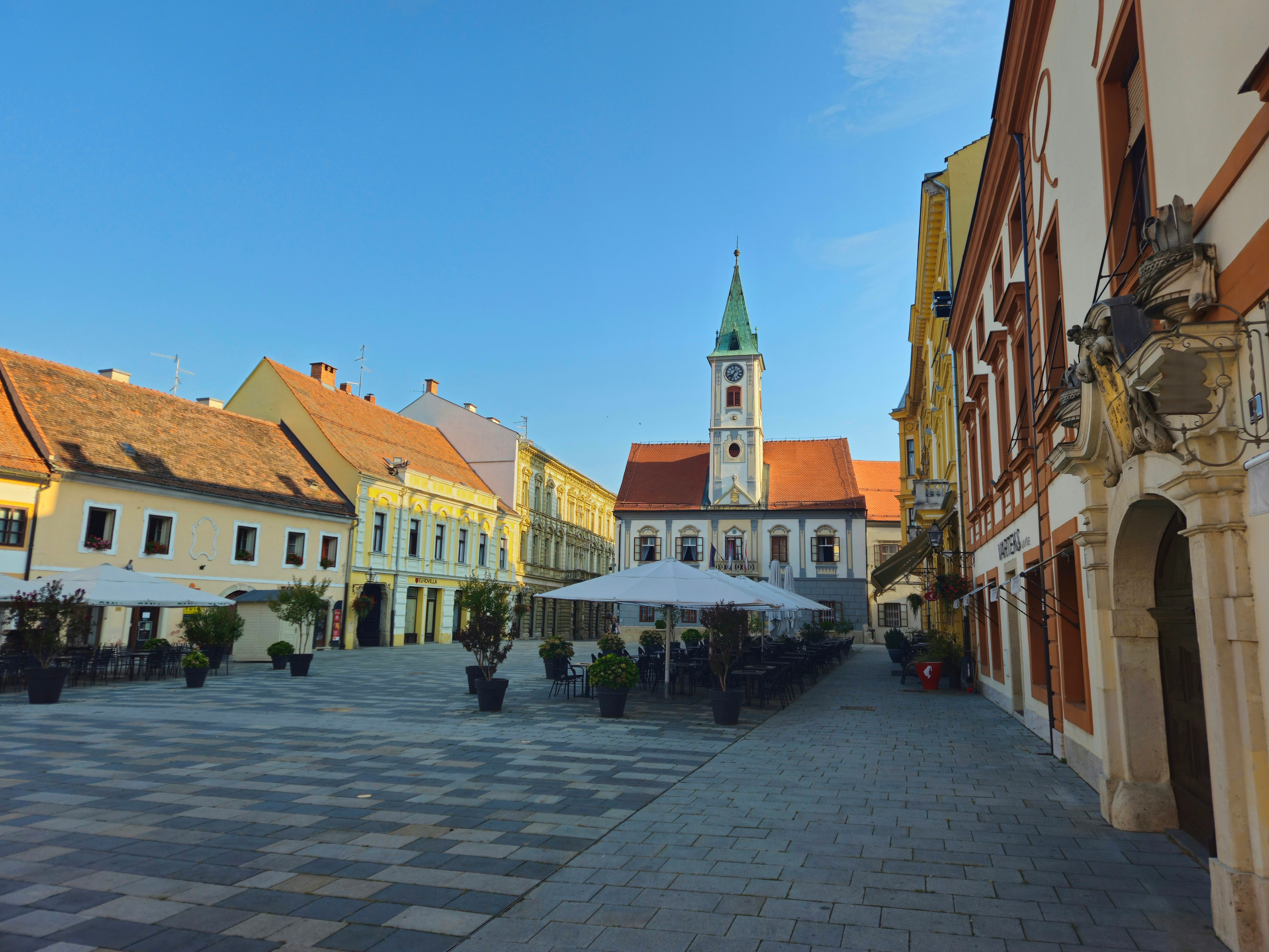
#10 Varaždin

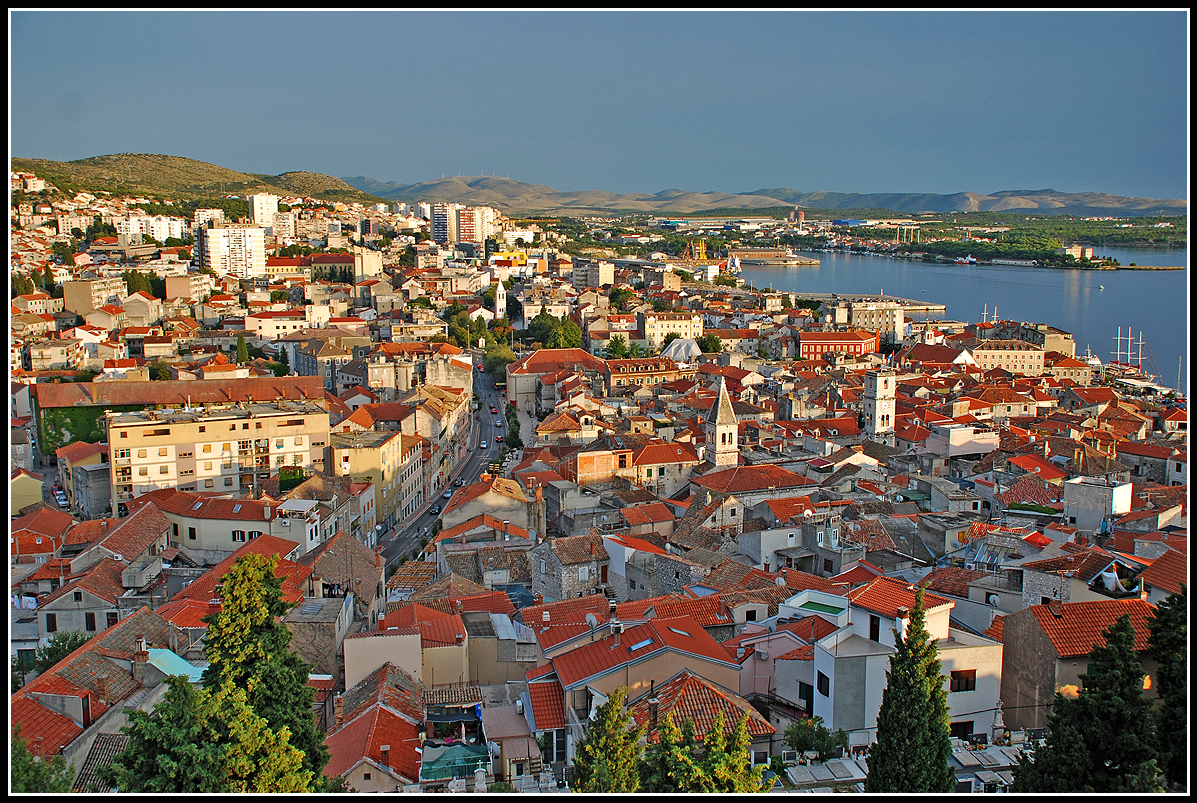
#11 Šibenik

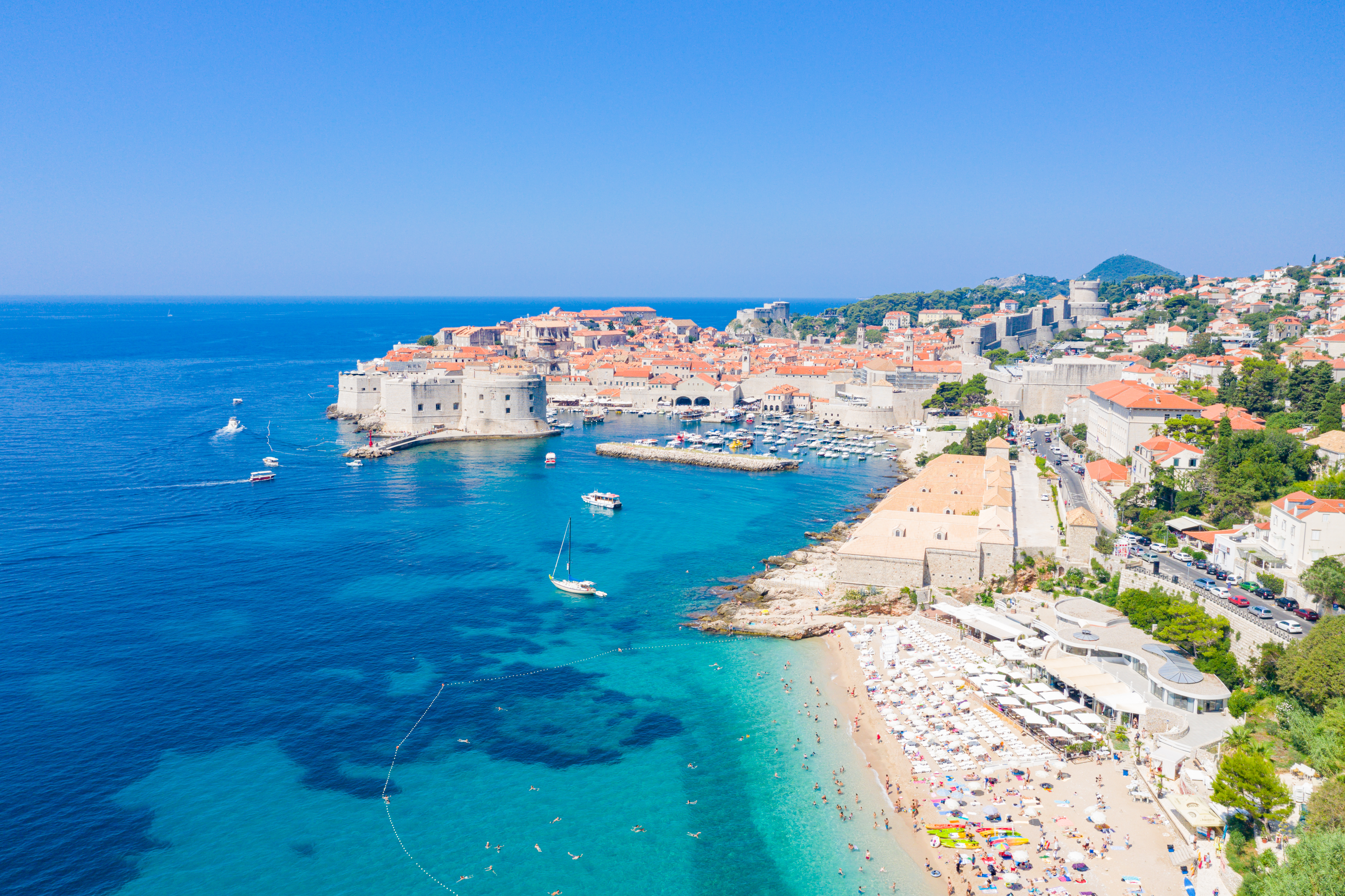
#12 Dubrovnik

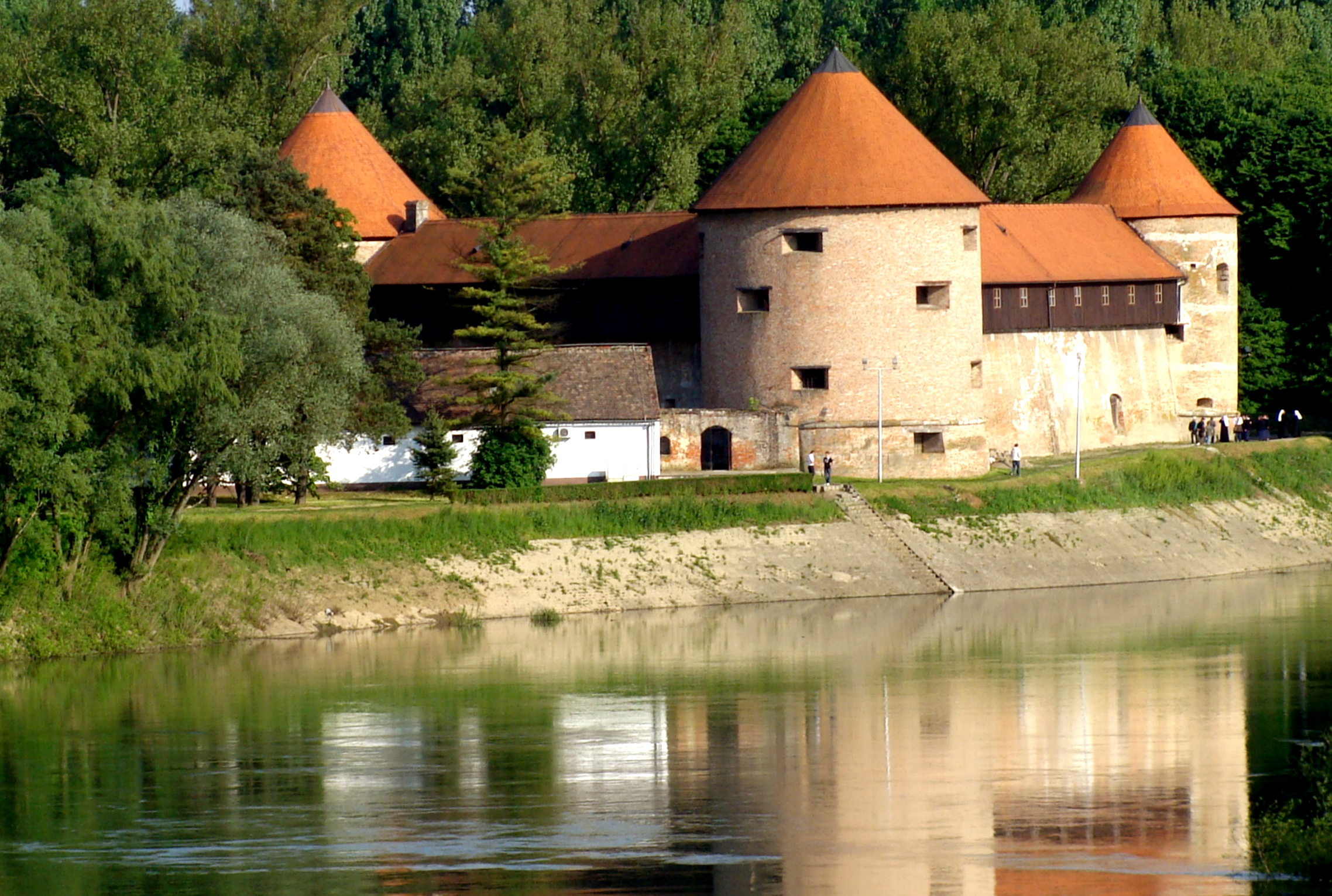
#13 Sisak

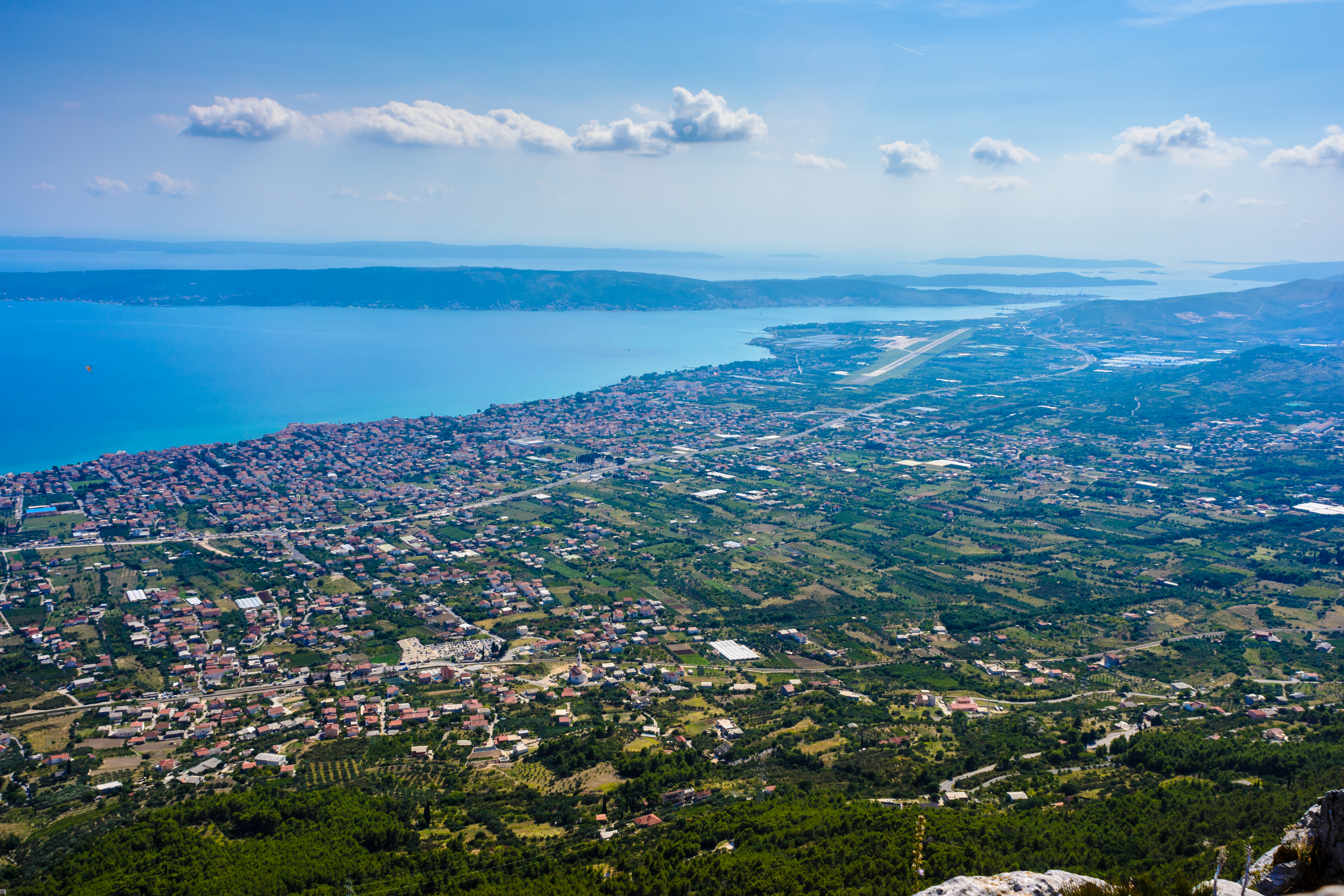
#14 Kaštela

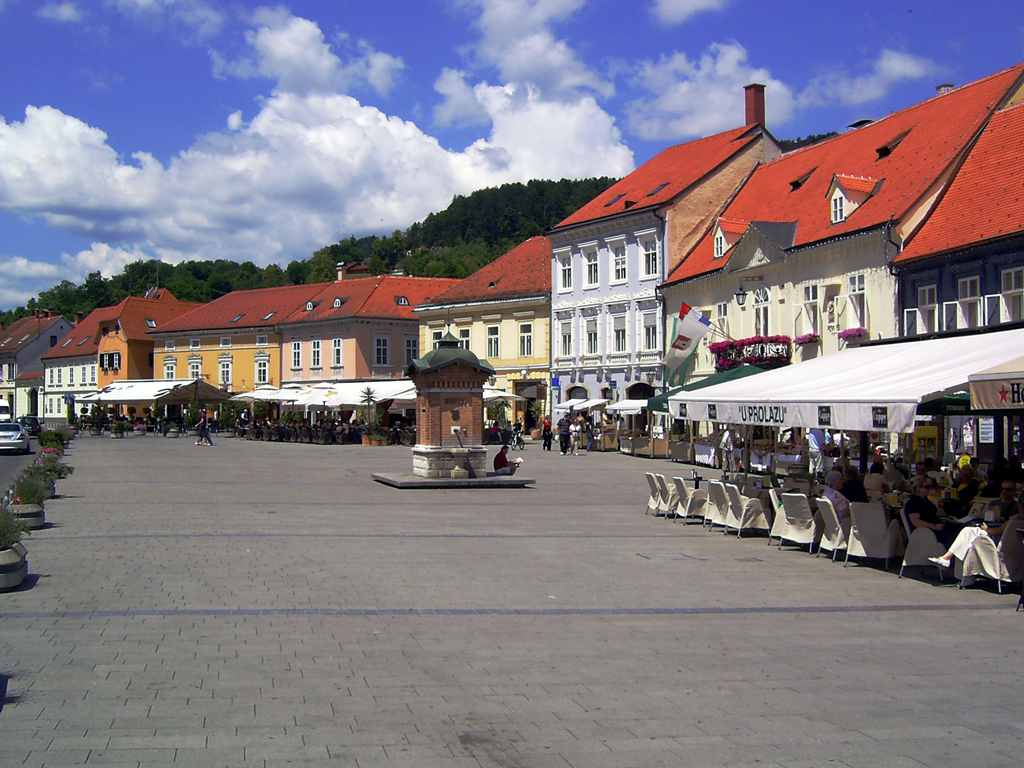
#15 Samobor

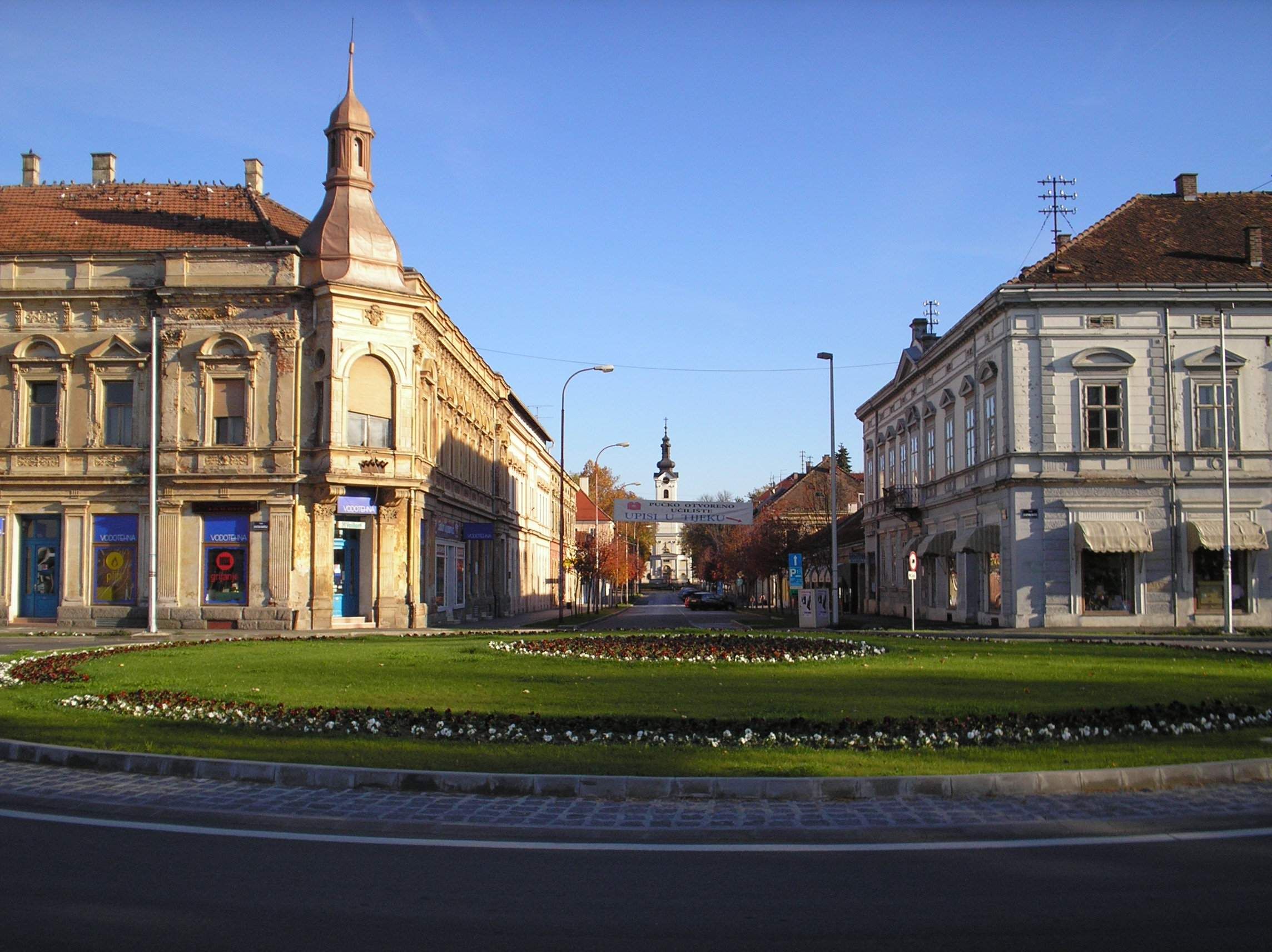
#16 Bjelovar

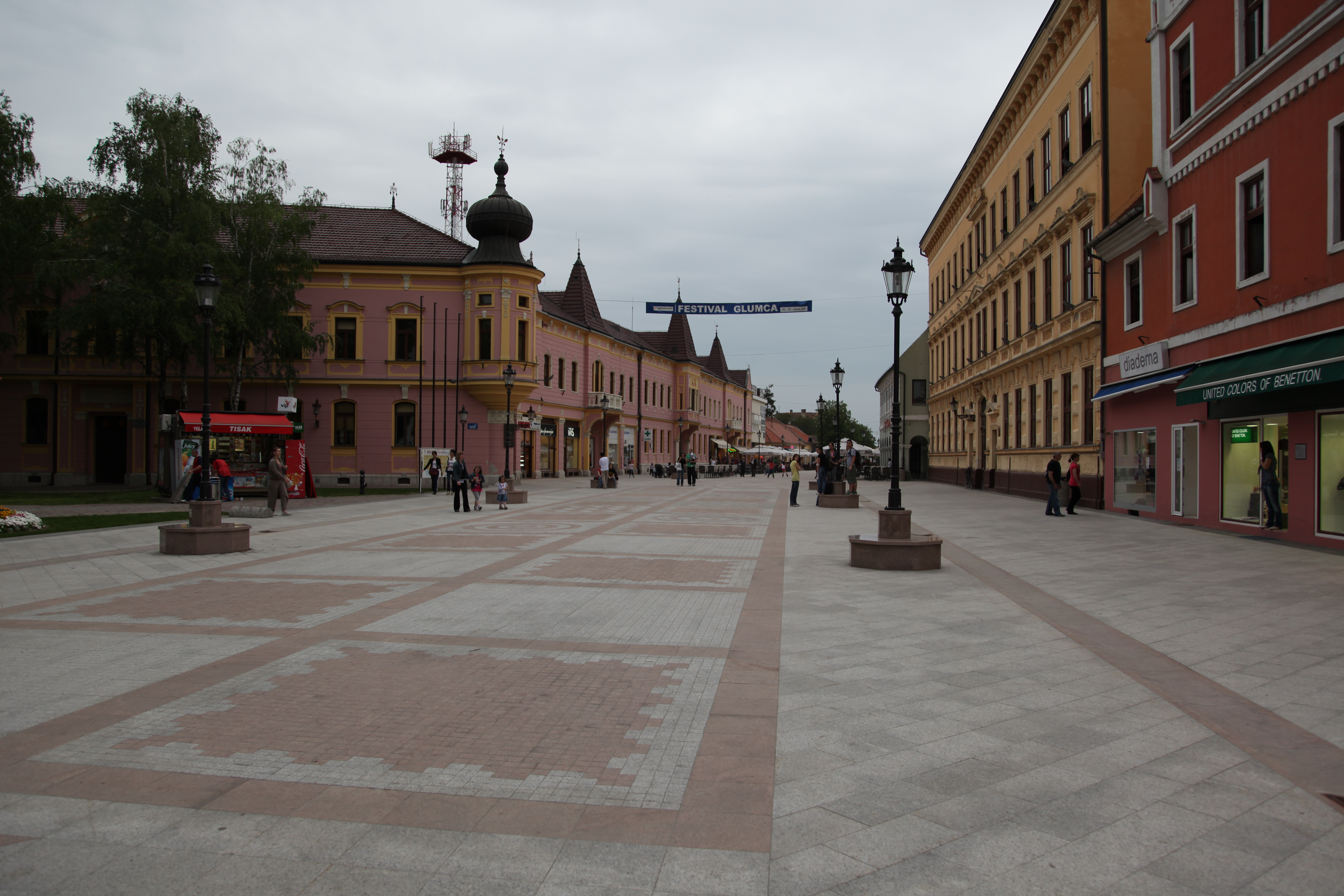
#17 Vinkovci

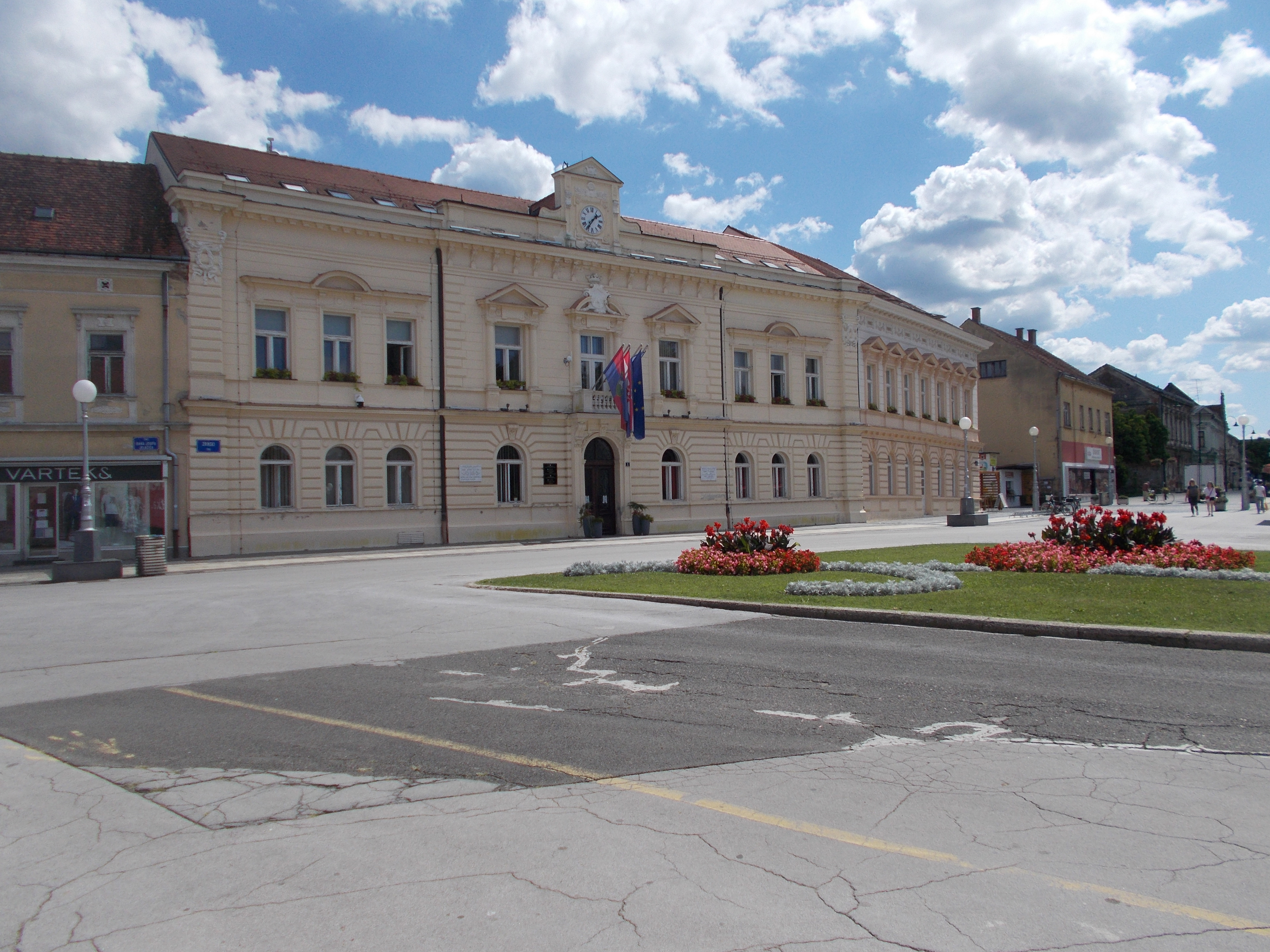
#18 Koprivnica

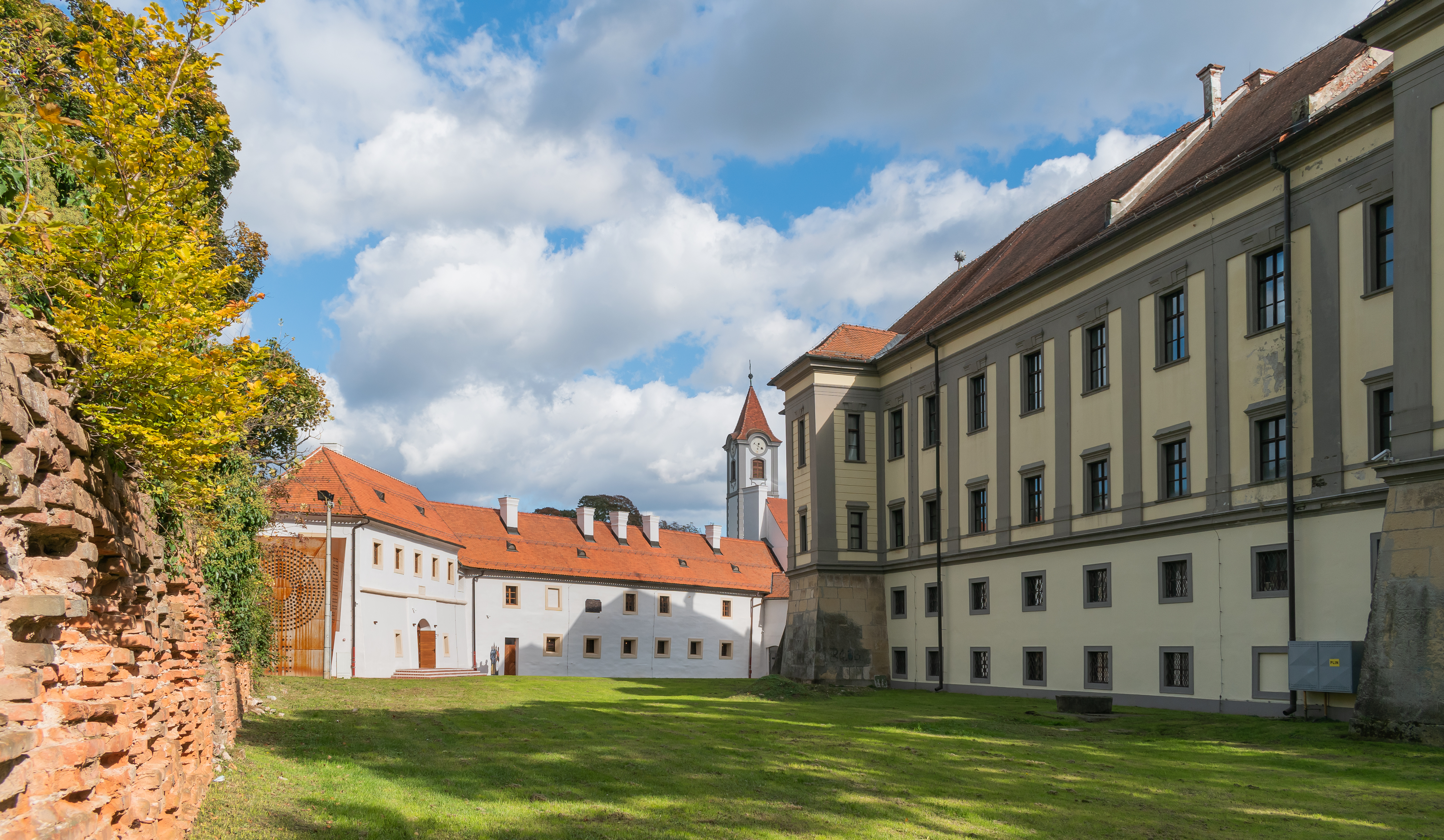
#19 Čakovec

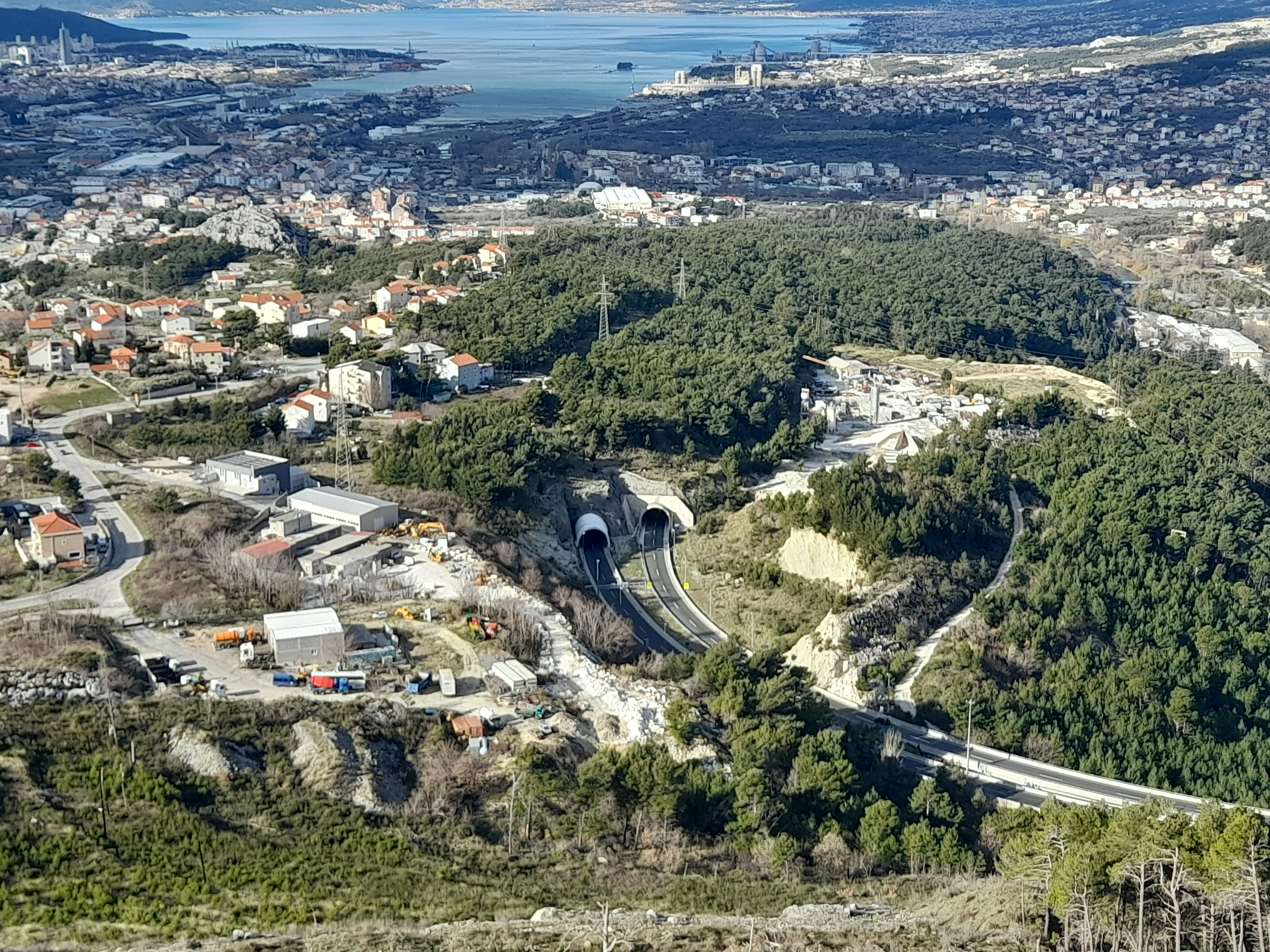
#20 Solin

| City / town | County | Municipal | | Town/City proper | |
| City / town | County | 2021 pop. | Rank | 2021 pop. | Rank |
|---|---|---|---|---|---|
| Zagreb ¤ | Zagreb | 767,131 | 1 | 663,592 | 1 |
| Split ¤ | Split-Dalmatia | 160,577 | 2 | 149,830 | 2 |
| Rijeka ¤ | Primorje-Gorski Kotar | 107,964 | 3 | 107,964 | 3 |
| Osijek ¤ | Osijek-Baranja | 96,313 | 4 | 75,535 | 4 |
| Zadar ¤ | Zadar County | 70,779 | 5 | 67,309 | 5 |
| Velika Gorica | Zagreb County | 61,075 | 6 | 30,036 | 11 |
| Pula | Istria County | 52,220 | 7 | 52,220 | 6 |
| Slavonski Brod ¤ | Brod-Posavina | 49,891 | 8 | 45,005 | 7 |
| Karlovac ¤ | Karlovac County | 49,377 | 9 | 41,869 | 8 |
| Varaždin ¤ | Varaždin County | 43,782 | 10 | 36,187 | 9 |
| Šibenik ¤ | Šibenik-Knin | 42,599 | 11 | 31,115 | 10 |
| Dubrovnik ¤ | Dubrovnik-Neretva | 41,562 | 12 | 26,922 | 14 |
| Sisak ¤ | Sisak-Moslavina | 40,121 | 13 | 27,859 | 13 |
| Kaštela | Split-Dalmatia | 37,794 | 14 | — | — |
| Samobor | Zagreb County | 37,435 | 15 | 16,911 | 20 |
| Bjelovar ¤ | Bjelovar-Bilogora | 36,316 | 16 | 24,392 | 15 |
| Vinkovci | Vukovar-Srijem | 30,842 | 17 | 28,111 | 12 |
| Koprivnica ¤ | Koprivnica-Križevci | 28,580 | 18 | 22,262 | 16 |
| Čakovec ¤ | Međimurje | 27,122 | 19 | 15,078 | 23 |
| Solin | Split-Dalmatia | 24,862 | 20 | 20,996 | 18 |
| Zaprešić | Zagreb County | 24,133 | 21 | 18,768 | 19 |
| Đakovo | Osijek-Baranja | 23,577 | 22 | 16,875 | 21 |
| Sinj | Split-Dalmatia | 23,452 | 23 | 10,771 | 31 |
| Vukovar ¤ | Vukovar-Srijem | 23,175 | 24 | 22,255 | 17 |
| Požega ¤ | Požega-Slavonia | 22,294 | 25 | 16,867 | 22 |
| Petrinja | Sisak-Moslavina | 19,950 | 26 | 12,963 | 26 |
| Kutina | Sisak-Moslavina | 19,601 | 27 | 12,012 | 28 |
| Virovitica ¤ | Virovitica-Podravina County | 19,302 | 28 | 13,486 | 25 |
| Križevci | Koprivnica-Križevci | 18,949 | 29 | 10,522 | 32 |
| Sveta Nedelja | Zagreb County | 18,221 | 30 | 1,363 | 116 |
| Dugo Selo | Zagreb County | 17,676 | 31 | 11,097 | 30 |
| Poreč | Istria County | 16,607 | 32 | 8,841 | 37 |
| Metković | Dubrovnik-Neretva | 15,235 | 33 | 13,971 | 24 |
| Sveti Ivan Zelina | Zagreb County | 14,602 | 34 | 2,583 | 93 |
| Jastrebarsko | Zagreb County | 14,562 | 35 | 5,312 | 60 |
| Našice | Osijek-Baranja | 14,291 | 36 | 7,307 | 43 |
| Omiš | Split-Dalmatia | 14,139 | 37 | 5,985 | 50 |
| Makarska | Split-Dalmatia | 13,301 | 38 | 12,809 | 27 |
| Ivanić-Grad | Zagreb County | 12,982 | 39 | 8,452 | 39 |
| Vrbovec | Zagreb County | 12,981 | 40 | 4,551 | 63 |
| Rovinj | Istria County | 12,968 | 41 | 11,629 | 29 |
| Ivanec | Varaždin County | 12,723 | 42 | 4,997 | 61 |
| Umag | Istria County | 12,699 | 43 | 6,751 | 44 |
| Trogir | Split-Dalmatia | 12,393 | 44 | 10,107 | 34 |
| Ogulin | Karlovac County | 12,246 | 45 | 7,374 | 42 |
| Novi Marof | Varaždin County | 11,795 | 46 | 1,810 | 111 |
| Nova Gradiška | Brod-Posavina | 11,690 | 47 | 9,820 | 35 |
| Knin | Šibenik-Knin | 11,633 | 48 | 8,262 | 40 |
| Krapina ¤ | Krapina-Zagorje | 11,530 | 49 | 4,201 | 64 |
| Slatina | Virovitica-Podravina County | 11,503 | 50 | 8,722 | 38 |
| Gospić ¤ | Lika-Senj | 11,502 | 51 | 6,362 | 46 |
| Novska | Sisak-Moslavina | 11,137 | 52 | 5,922 | 51 |
| Opatija | Primorje-Gorski Kotar | 10,619 | 53 | 5,701 | 54 |
| Labin | Istria County | 10,424 | 54 | 5,806 | 53 |
| Popovača | Sisak-Moslavina | 10,255 | 55 | 3,633 | 75 |
| Duga Resa | Karlovac County | 10,212 | 56 | 5,380 | 57 |
| Kastav | Primorje-Gorski Kotar | 10,202 | 57 | 10,202 | 33 |
| Daruvar | Bjelovar-Bilogora | 10,105 | 58 | 7,440 | 41 |
| Crikvenica | Primorje-Gorski Kotar | 9,980 | 59 | 6,239 | 49 |
| Valpovo | Osijek-Baranja | 9,784 | 60 | 6,332 | 47 |
| Benkovac | Zadar County | 9,680 | 61 | 2,484 | 94 |
| Imotski | Split-Dalmatia | 9,153 | 62 | 4,008 | 69 |
| Županja | Vukovar-Srijem | 9,153 | 62 | 9,153 | 36 |
| Pleternica | Požega-Slavonia | 9,138 | 64 | 2,895 | 88 |
| Belišće | Osijek-Baranja | 8,884 | 65 | 5,354 | 58 |
| Zabok | Krapina-Zagorje | 8,656 | 66 | 3,408 | 80 |
| Vodice | Šibenik-Knin | 8,649 | 67 | 6,592 | 45 |
| Garešnica | Bjelovar-Bilogora | 8,624 | 68 | 3,294 | 85 |
| Ludbreg | Varaždin County | 8,477 | 69 | 3,463 | 78 |
| Otočac | Lika-Senj | 8,332 | 70 | 3,852 | 73 |
| Pazin ¤ | Istria County | 8,279 | 71 | 3,981 | 70 |
| Ploče | Dubrovnik-Neretva | 8,220 | 72 | 4,711 | 62 |
| Trilj | Split-Dalmatia | 8,182 | 73 | 1,906 | 109 |
| Donji Miholjac | Osijek-Baranja | 8,031 | 74 | 5,330 | 59 |
| Beli Manastir | Osijek-Baranja | 7,973 | 75 | 6,327 | 48 |
| Bakar | Primorje-Gorski Kotar | 7,573 | 76 | 1,187 | 119 |
| Mali Lošinj | Primorje-Gorski Kotar | 7,537 | 77 | 5,561 | 56 |
| Đurđevac | Koprivnica-Križevci | 7,378 | 78 | 5,834 | 52 |
| Rab | Primorje-Gorski Kotar | 7,161 | 79 | 364 | 126 |
| Glina | Sisak-Moslavina | 7,116 | 80 | 4,028 | 68 |
| Pakrac | Požega-Slavonia | 7,086 | 81 | 4,151 | 66 |
| Prelog | Međimurje | 7,027 | 82 | 4,042 | 67 |
| Lepoglava | Varaždin County | 6,945 | 83 | 3,400 | 81 |
| Čazma | Bjelovar-Bilogora | 6,930 | 84 | 2,417 | 95 |
| Krk | Primorje-Gorski Kotar | 6,816 | 85 | 3,935 | 71 |
| Drniš | Šibenik-Knin | 6,276 | 86 | 2,752 | 90 |
| Buzet | Istria County | 5,999 | 87 | 2,339 | 99 |
| Senj | Lika-Senj | 5,973 | 88 | 4,164 | 65 |
| Pregrada | Krapina-Zagorje | 5,927 | 89 | 1,870 | 110 |
| Mursko Središće | Međimurje | 5,855 | 90 | 3,321 | 84 |
| Vodnjan | Istria County | 5,838 | 91 | 3,133 | 87 |
| Ozalj | Karlovac County | 5,837 | 92 | 1,053 | 121 |
| Oroslavje | Krapina-Zagorje | 5,834 | 93 | 3,253 | 86 |
| Vrgorac | Split-Dalmatia | 5,698 | 94 | 2,132 | 103 |
| Biograd na Moru | Zadar County | 5,601 | 95 | 5,601 | 55 |
| Zlatar | Krapina-Zagorje | 5,574 | 96 | 2,825 | 89 |
| Varaždinske Toplice | Varaždin County | 5,537 | 97 | 1,606 | 112 |
| Korčula | Dubrovnik-Neretva | 5,415 | 98 | 2,659 | 91 |
| Grubišno Polje | Bjelovar-Bilogora | 5,367 | 99 | 2,588 | 92 |
| Donja Stubica | Krapina-Zagorje | 5,326 | 100 | 2,121 | 104 |
| Delnice | Primorje-Gorski Kotar | 5,135 | 101 | 3,861 | 72 |
| Lipik | Požega-Slavonia | 5,127 | 102 | 1,967 | 106 |
| Ilok | Vukovar-Srijem | 5,045 | 103 | 3,842 | 74 |
| Otok | Vukovar-Srijem | 4,899 | 104 | 3,571 | 76 |
| Kutjevo | Požega-Slavonia | 4,870 | 105 | 1,941 | 107 |
| Orahovica | Virovitica-Podravina County | 4,537 | 106 | 3,384 | 82 |
| Buje | Istria County | 4,441 | 107 | 2,087 | 105 |
| Novi Vinodolski | Primorje-Gorski Kotar | 4,328 | 108 | 3,336 | 83 |
| Supetar | Split-Dalmatia | 4,325 | 109 | 3,415 | 79 |
| Slunj | Karlovac County | 4,224 | 110 | 1,576 | 114 |
| Kraljevica | Primorje-Gorski Kotar | 4,066 | 111 | 2,415 | 96 |
| Hvar | Split-Dalmatia | 3,979 | 112 | 3,519 | 77 |
| Novigrad | Istria County | 3,889 | 113 | 2,292 | 101 |
| Vrbovsko | Primorje-Gorski Kotar | 3,876 | 114 | 1,257 | 118 |
| Novalja | Lika-Senj | 3,680 | 115 | 2,415 | 96 |
| Obrovac | Zadar County | 3,453 | 116 | 793 | 122 |
| Skradin | Šibenik-Knin | 3,349 | 117 | 508 | 124 |
| Čabar | Primorje-Gorski Kotar | 3,226 | 118 | 325 | 127 |
| Pag | Zadar County | 3,175 | 119 | 2,322 | 100 |
| Opuzen | Dubrovnik-Neretva | 2,838 | 120 | 2,355 | 98 |
| Stari Grad | Split-Dalmatia | 2,772 | 121 | 1,921 | 108 |
| Cres | Primorje-Gorski Kotar | 2,716 | 122 | 2,185 | 102 |
| Nin | Zadar County | 2,705 | 123 | 1,101 | 120 |
| Klanjec | Krapina-Zagorje | 2,548 | 124 | 506 | 125 |
| Vis | Split-Dalmatia | 1,918 | 125 | 1,582 | 113 |
| Hrvatska Kostajnica | Sisak-Moslavina | 1,879 | 126 | 1,439 | 115 |
| Vrlika | Split-Dalmatia | 1,728 | 127 | 718 | 123 |
| Komiža | Split-Dalmatia | 1,394 | 128 | 1,261 | 117 |

== See also ==
- Administrative divisions of Croatia
- Counties of Croatia
- Municipalities of Croatia
- Lists of cities by country
- List of mayors in Croatia

== Sources ==
- Croatian Parliament (2013-02-18). "Zakon o lokalnoj i područnoj (regionalnoj) samouoravi (pročišćeni tekst)" [Local and regional government act]. Narodne novine (in Croatian) (19/2013).
- Croatian Parliament (2012-12-21). "Zakon o lokalnim izborima" [Local elections act]. Narodne novine (in Croatian) (144/2012).
- "The Constitution of the Republic of Croatia (consolidated text)". Croatian Parliament. Archived from the original on 2015-11-02.
