= Mali Otok =

Mali Otok may refer to:

- Mali Otok, Slovenia, a village near Postojna
- Mali Otok, Croatia, a village near Legrad

== See also ==
- Veliki Otok
- Otok (disambiguation)
