= Veliki Otok =

Veliki Otok may refer to:

- Veliki Otok, Slovenia, a village near Postojna
- Veliki Otok, Croatia, a village near Legrad

== See also ==
- Mali Otok
- Otok (disambiguation)
