= Otok, Ljubuški =

Otok
- Village
- Location within Bosnia and Herzegovina
- Coordinates: 43.228111°N 17.474401°E
- Country: Bosnia and Herzegovina
- Entity: Federation of Bosnia and Herzegovina
- Canton: West Herzegovina
- Municipality: Ljubuški

Area
  - Total: 0.92 sq mi (2.38 km^{2})

Population (2013)
  - Total: 590
  - Density: 640/sq mi (250/km^{2})
- Time zone: UTC+1 (CET)
  - Summer (DST): UTC+2 (CEST)

Otok is a village in Bosnia and Herzegovina. According to the 1991 census, the village is located in the municipality of Ljubuški.

== Demographics ==
According to the 2013 census, its population was 590.

Ethnicity in 2013
| Ethnicity | Number | Percentage |
|---|---|---|
| Croats | 588 | 99.7% |
| Serbs | 1 | 0.2% |
| other/undeclared | 1 | 0.2% |
| Total | 590 | 100% |
