= Otok, Vukovar-Syrmia County =

Otok
- Town
- Grad Otok; Town of Otok
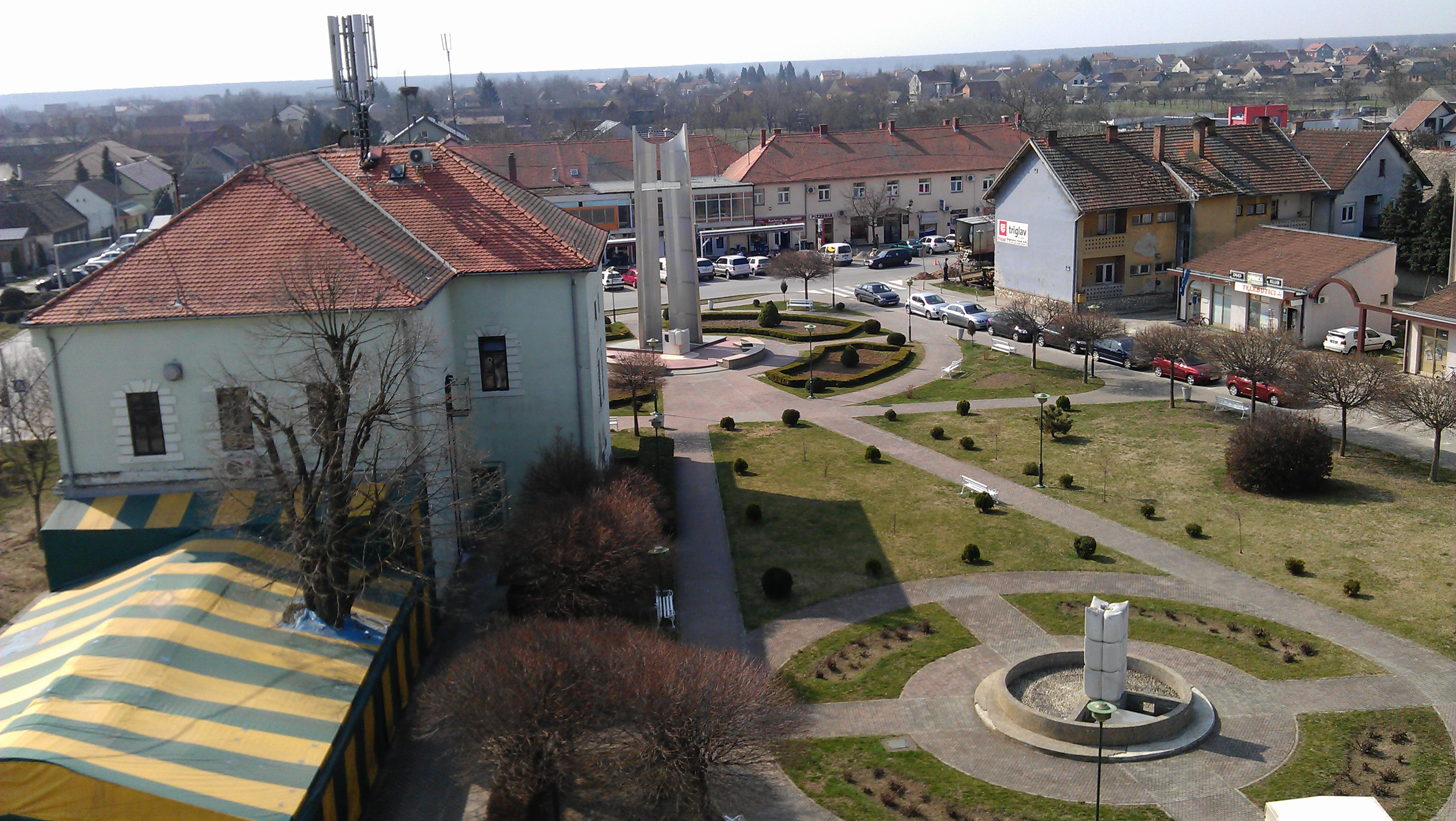
- Otok town center

- Flag Seal

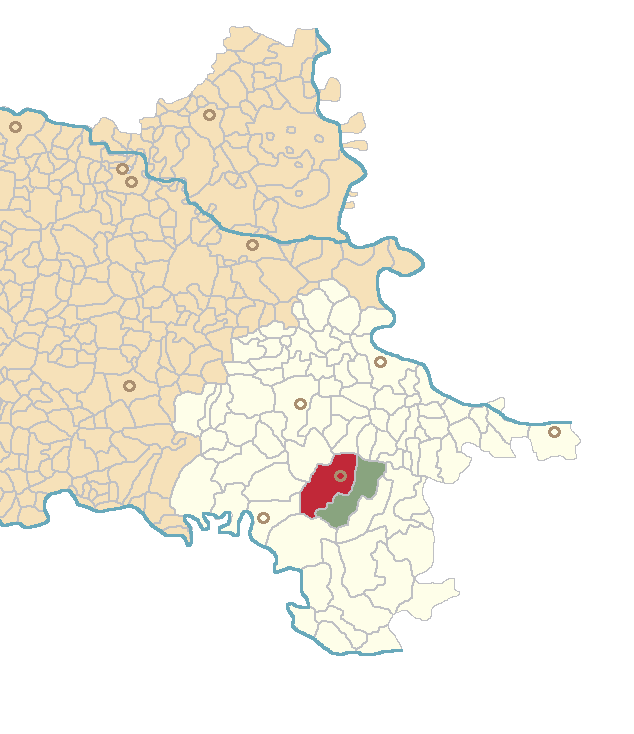

- Location of Otok in Croatia Otok (Croatia) Otok (Europe)
- Coordinates: 45°8′48.12″N 18°53′2.04″E
- Country: Croatia
- Region: Slavonia (Syrmia, Spačva basin)
- County: Vukovar-Syrmia County

Government
  - Mayor: Slavko Grgić (DP)

Area
  - Town: 136.5 km^{2} (52.7 sq mi)
  - Urban: 74.1 km^{2} (28.6 sq mi)

Population (2021)
  - Town: 4,899
  - Density: 35.89/km^{2} (92.95/sq mi)
  - Urban: 3,571
  - Urban density: 48.2/km^{2} (125/sq mi)
- Time zone: UTC+1 (CET)
  - Summer (DST): UTC+2 (CEST)
- Postal code: 32252
- Area code: 32
- Vehicle registration: VK
- Website: otok.hr

Otok (Hungarian: Atak) is a town in eastern Croatia, located 20 km south of Vinkovci, in eastern Slavonia. The settlement gained the status of town by the decision of the Parliament of Croatia on July 13, 2006. At the time, nearby Privlaka was a part of the municipality, but was subsequently declared a municipality in its own right. The population of the town of Otok is 6,343 (census 2011), with 4,694 residents in Otok itself and 1,649 in the nearby village of Komletinci. In the census of 2011, 99.31% of the population declared themselves Croats.

Town of Otok: Population trends 1857–2021
v

population	4745	5149	5777	5491	5500	5590	5034	5301	6036	6600	7394	7896	7721	7924	7755	6343	4899
	1857	1869	1880	1890	1900	1910	1921	1931	1948	1953	1961	1971	1981	1991	2001	2011	2021

Sources: Croatian Bureau of Statistics publications

== History ==
Following Ottoman retreat from the region, the Lordship of Vukovar was established, and the village became part of its domain.

== Otok (settlement) ==
Settlement of Otok: Population trends 1857–2021
v

population	2952	3250	3637	3475	3555	3568	3184	3295	3868	4193	4838	5519	5707	5889	5858	4694	3571
	1857	1869	1880	1890	1900	1910	1921	1931	1948	1953	1961	1971	1981	1991	2001	2011	2021

Sources: Croatian Bureau of Statistics publications

=== 1991 census ===
Otok
Population by ethnicity
total: 5,889
1. Croats 5,758 (97.8%)
2. Serbs 25 (0.42%)
3. Muslims 17 (0.28%)
4. Hungarians 9 (0.15%)
5. Slovaks 7 (0.11%)
6. Yugoslavs 5 (0.08%)
7. Albanians 3 (0.05%)
8. Slovenes 2 (0.03%)
9. Germans 1 (0.01%)
10. Rusyns 1 (0.01%)
11. nondeclared 23 (0.39%)
12. unknown 38 (0.64%)

=== 1910 census ===
According to the 1910 census, settlement of Otok had 3,568 inhabitants which were linguistically and religiously declared as this:

Otok
Population by language	Population by religion
total: 3,568: 1. Croatian 3,119 (87.4%); 2. German 123 (3.44%); 3. Hungarian 56 (1.56%); 4. Serbian 48 (1.34%); 5. Slovene 41 (1.14%); 6. Slovak 8 (0.22%); 7. Czech 2 (0.05%); 8. Italian 1 (0.02%); 9. Rusyn 1 (0.02%); 10. others 169 (4.73%)	total: 3,568: 1. Rom. Cath. 3,299 (92.5%); 2. East. Orthodox 214 (5.99%); 3. Jewish 18 (0.50%); 4. Calvinists 17 (0.47%); 5. Lutherans 11 (0.30%); 6. East. Catholics 9 (0.25%)
