= Komletinci =

- Village (Selo)
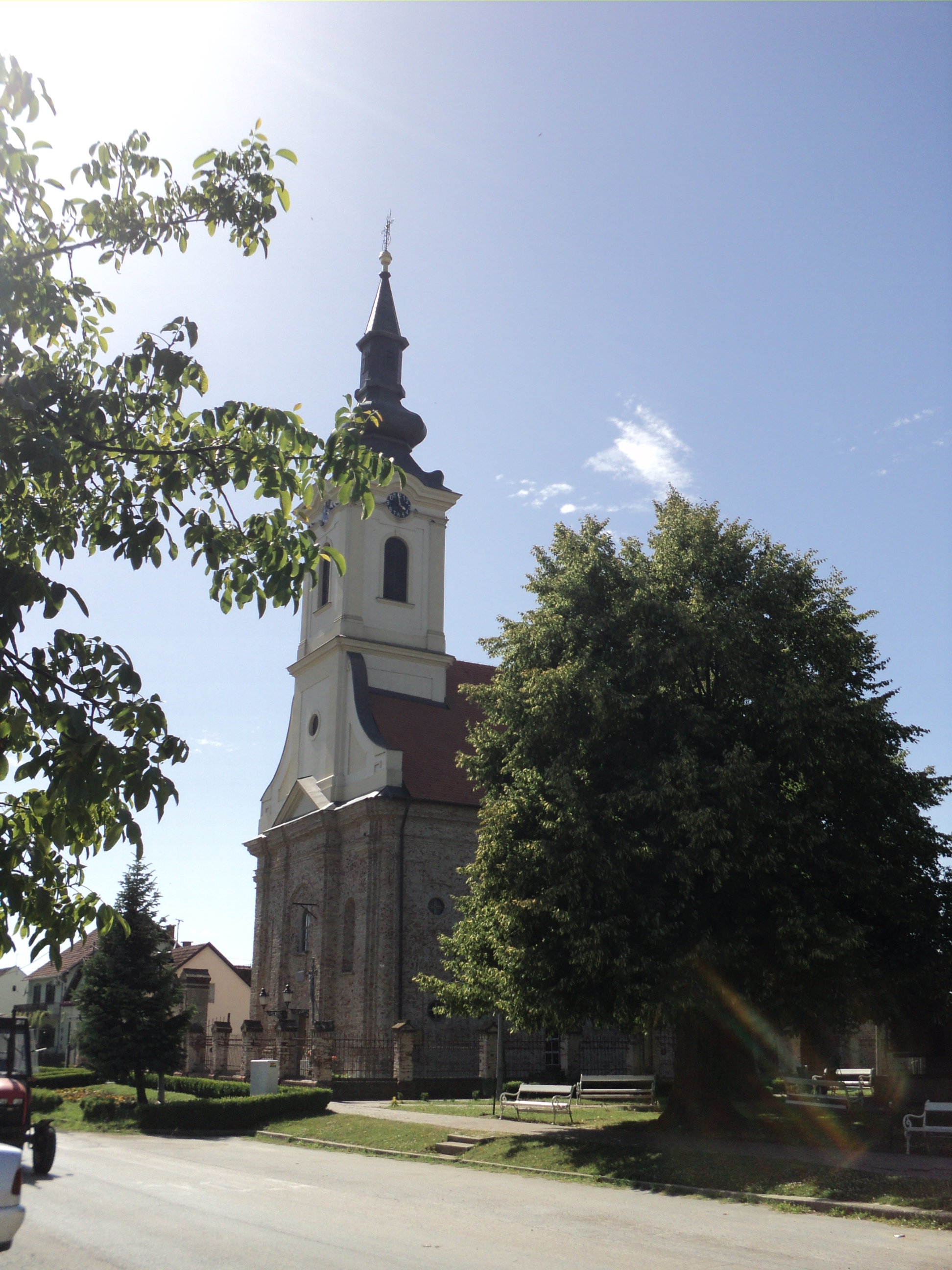

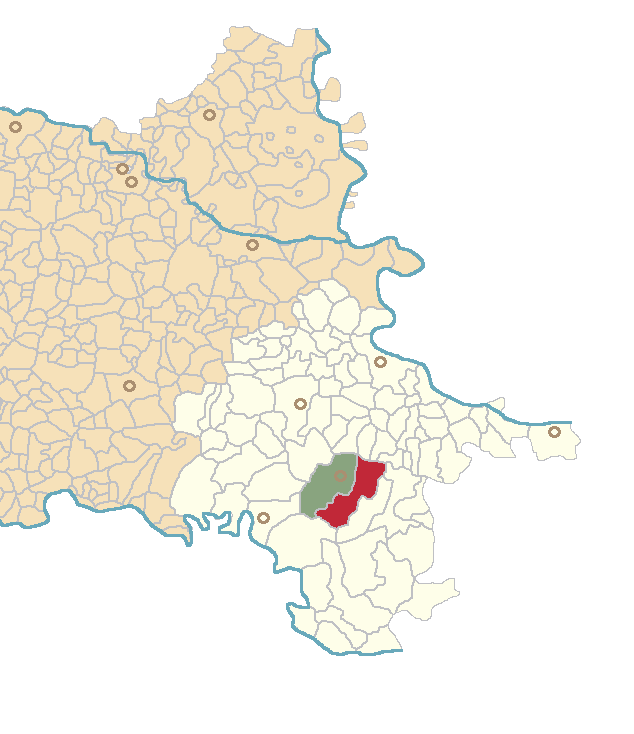

- Location within Vukovar-Syrmia County Location within Croatia Location within Europe
- Coordinates: 45.150054°N 18.948882°E
- Country: Croatia
- Region: Syrmia (Spačva basin)
- County: Vukovar-Syrmia
- Municipality: Otok

Area
  - Total: 62.4 km^{2} (24.1 sq mi)

Population (2021)
  - Total: 1,328
  - Density: 21.3/km^{2} (55.1/sq mi)

Komletinci (Hungarian: Kemetinc) is a village in eastern Croatia located east of Otok. The population is 1,649 (census 2011).

== Name ==
The name of the village in Croatian is plural.

== History ==
Following Ottoman retreat from the region, the Lordship of Vukovar was established, and the village became part of its domain in 1702.

== Demographics ==
Settlement of Komletinci: Population trends 1857–2021
v

population	1793	1899	2140	2016	1945	2022	1850	2006	2168	2407	2556	2377	2014	2035	1897	1649	1328
	1857	1869	1880	1890	1900	1910	1921	1931	1948	1953	1961	1971	1981	1991	2001	2011	2021

Sources: Croatian Bureau of Statistics publications

=== 1991 census ===
Komletinci
Population by ethnicity
total: 2,035
1. Croats 1,951 (95.9%)
2. Slovaks 21 (1.03%)
3. Albanians 9 (0.44%)
4. Serbs 5 (0.24%)
5. Hungarians 2 (0.09%)
6. Germans 1 (0.04%)
7. nondeclared 9 (0.44%)
8. unknown 37 (1.81%)

=== 1910 census ===
According to the 1910 census, settlement of Komletinci had 2,022 inhabitants which were linguistically and religiously declared as this:

Komletinci
Population by language	Population by religion
total: 2,022: 1. Croatian 1,761 (87.1%); 2. Hungarian 85 (4.20%); 3. German 35 (1.73%); 4. Serbian 18 (0.89%); 5. Slovene 8 (0.39%); 6. Rusyn 5 (0.24%); 7. Slovak 2 (0.09%); 8. others 108 (5.34%)	total: 2,022: 1. Rom. Cath. 1,874 (92.7%); 2. East. Orthodox 128 (6.33%); 3. Jewish 12 (0.59%); 4. East. Catholics 5 (0.24%); 5. Calvinists 3 (0.14%)

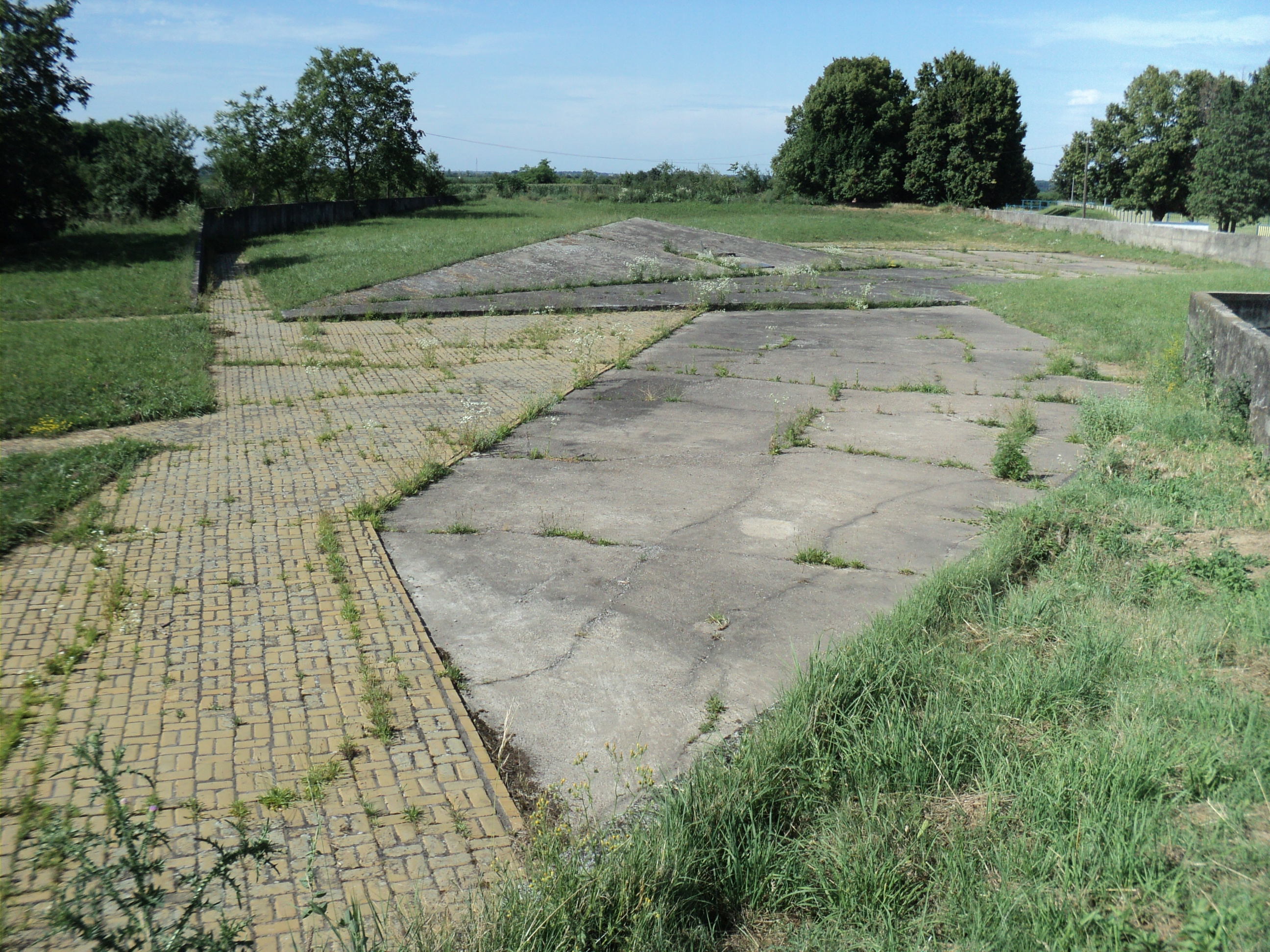
Yugoslav Partisans memorial cemetery
