= D214 road =

Road in Croatia

D214 state road

Route information
- Length: 28.8 km (17.9 mi)

Major junctions
- From: D55 in Županja
- To: Gunja border crossing to Bosnia and Herzegovina

Location
- Country: Croatia
- Counties: Vukovar-Srijem
- Major cities: Županja, Gunja

Highway system
- Highways in Croatia

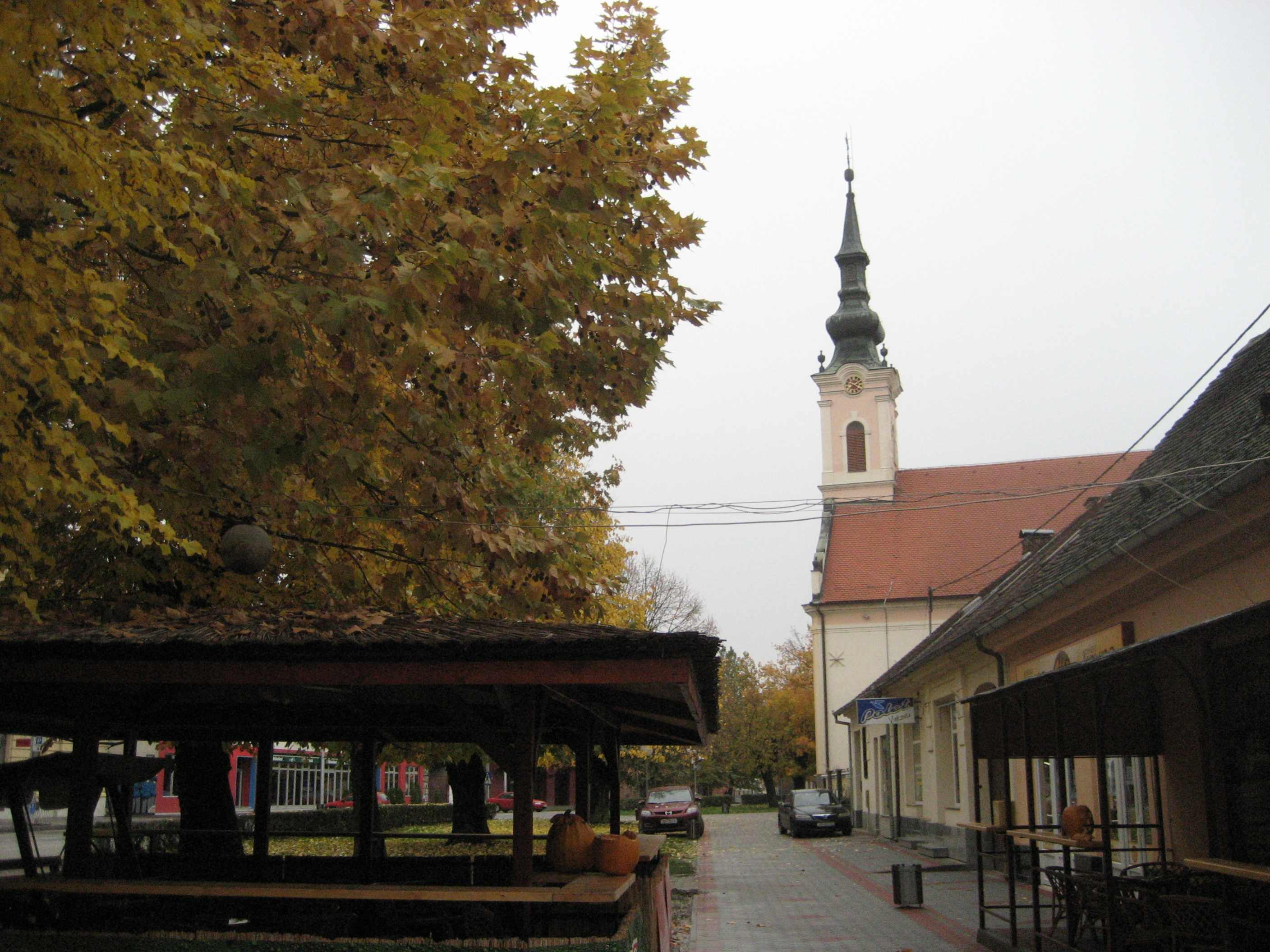
Županja, on the northern terminus of the D214 route

D214 state road is located in the eastern part of Slavonia region of Croatia connecting the cities and towns of Županja and Gunja to the state road network of Croatia, most notably to the A3 motorway Županja interchange via D55 state road and Gunja border crossing to Brčko, Bosnia and Herzegovina. The road is 28.8 km (17.9 mi) long.

This and all other state roads in Croatia are managed and maintained by Hrvatske ceste, state-owned company.

== Traffic volume ==
Traffic is regularly counted and reported by Hrvatske ceste, operator of the road.

D214 traffic volume
Road	Counting site	AADT	ASDT	Notes
D214	4501 Posavski Podgajci	1,882	2,222	Adjacent to Ž4230 junction.

== Road junctions and populated areas ==
D214 junctions/populated areas
Type	Slip roads/Notes
	Županja; D55 to A1 motorway Županja interchange and Vinkovci (to the north) and to Županja border crossing (to the south). The northern terminus of the road.
	Bošnjaci; Ž4223 to Otok. Ž4229 to Ž4172 county road.
	Posavski Podgajci
	Ž4230 to Soljani and Strošinci.
	Ž4232 to Rajevo Selo.
	Gunja; Ž4172 to Vrbanja, Otok and Privlaka.
	Gunja border crossing. The southern terminus of the road. The route extends to Brčko, Bosnia and Herzegovina.
