= Gunja Mosque =

Mosque in Vukovar-Srijem, Croatia

- Džamija u Gunji
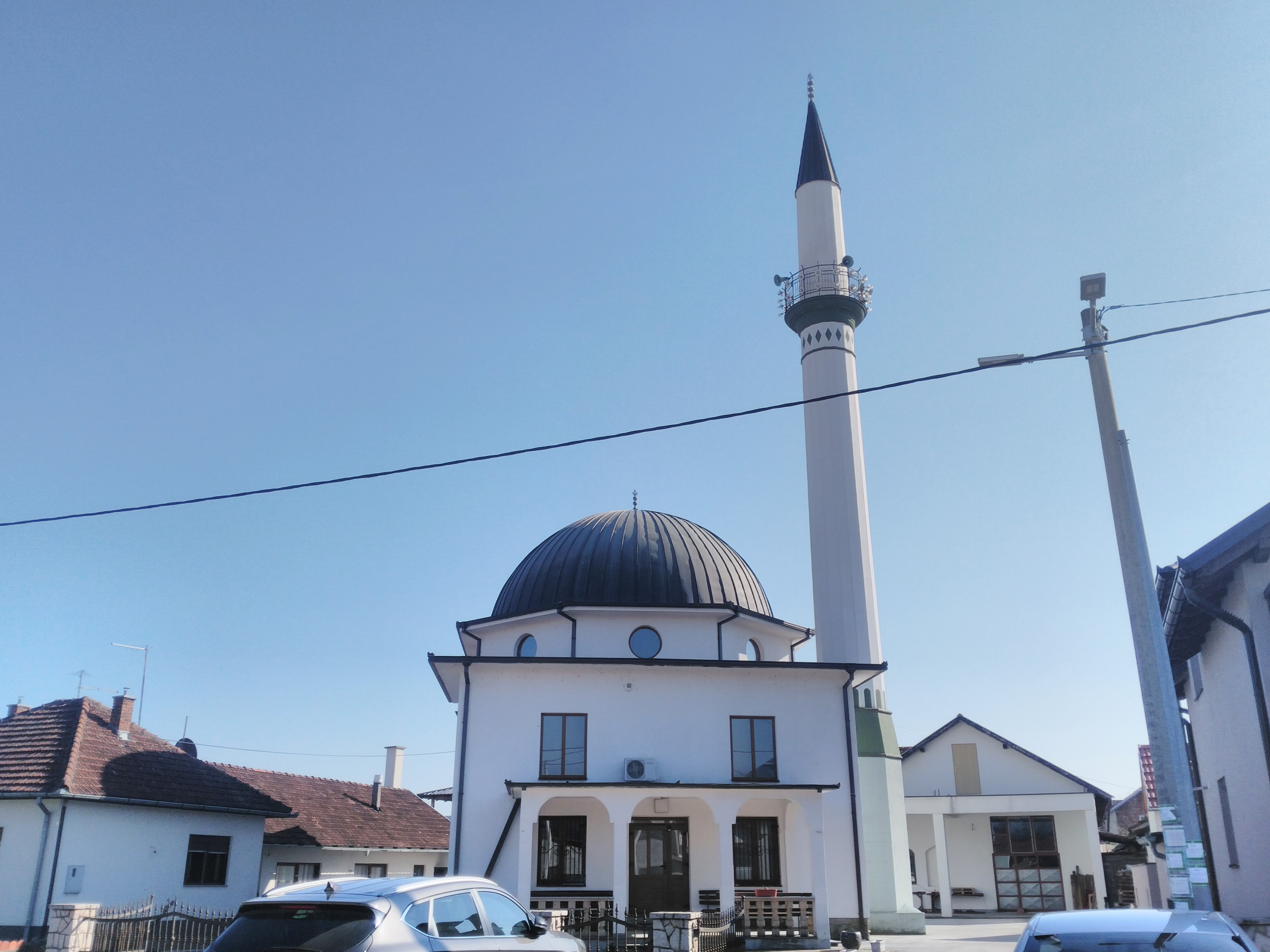

- Location of the mosque in Croatia

Religion
- Affiliation: Islam
- Ecclesiastical or organizational status: Mosque
- Status: Active

Location
- Location: Gunja, Vukovar-Syrmia County
- Country: Croatia
- Interactive map of Gunja Mosque
- Coordinates: 44°53′23.5″N 18°49′11″E

Architecture
- Architect: Faruk Muzurović
- Type: Mosque
- Style: Ottoman Revival
- Completed: 1969

Specifications
- Dome: 1
- Minaret: 1

The Gunja Mosque (Croatian/Bosnian: Džamija u Gunji) is a mosque, located in the village of Gunja in the Syrmia county of Croatia. Built in 1969, it is the oldest active mosque in the country.

== History ==
The Gunja Mosque is the oldest mosque in Croatia in continuous use. During the Ottoman era, there was 250 mosques in Croatia. However, as of 2014, only three mosques remained standing. The largest and most representative one of them, Ibrahim Pasha's Mosque, is located in eastern Croatian town of Đakovo but is today used as the Roman Catholic Church of All Saints. Another mosque in eastern Croatia, which today does not exist, was located in Osijek. It was the Kasım Pasha Mosque constructed after 1526 at the site of modern-day Church of Saint Michael. Most of the Ottoman structures in the region were systematically destroyed after the Treaty of Karlowitz.

=== Post-World War II ===
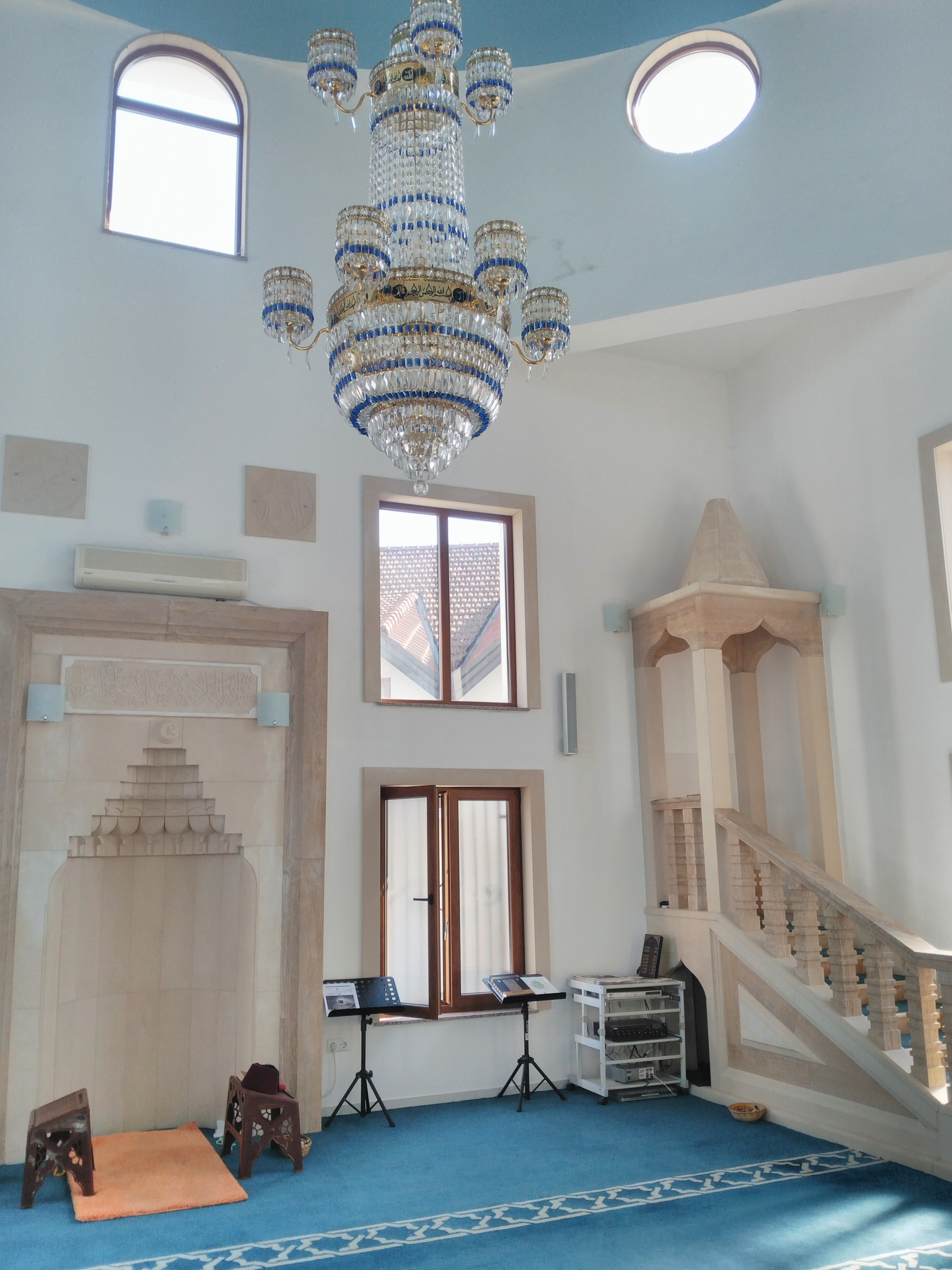
Interior of the mosque

In contemporary history, the first Muslim refugees from eastern Bosnia settled in Gunja in 1942 during World War II in Yugoslavia. They returned to Bosnia, but once they witnessed the extent of destruction some of them returned once again to Gunja. Some 50 Muslim families from Velika Kladuša settled in Gunja after the Cazin rebellion. During the existence of the Socialist Federal Republic of Yugoslavia, the Muslim community in Gunja increased to 2,500 individuals. Seventy Muslim families moved to Gunja from Srebrenica in the 1970s; as Gunja was an attractive location for Muslim settlers from Bosnia as it functioned as a de facto suburb of the city of Brčko across the Sava river. Local džemat was established in 1957 and was led by Abdurahman ef. Hodžić from Ustikolina, who later returned to Ustikolina for health reasons. He was succeeded by Hazim ef. Hodžić from Vražići (who was earlier a prisoner for his membership in Young Muslims) but he also left for Bijeljina leading local community to unite with the one in the Atik Mosque in Brčko. At the same time the community decided to form an initiative to build a mosque and started the process once all permissions were issued. The Čandić family granted 3,134 square metres (33,730 sq ft) for the new mosque.

=== Construction of the mosque ===
The mosque in Gunja was completed in 1969 after 14 months and functioned as the only active mosque in Croatia until Zagreb Mosque was completed in 1987. The current dome of the Gunja Mosque was constructed in 1999 based on the Neo-Ottoman design by Faruk Muzurović which strictly followed historical examples of Ottoman architecture in Balkans leading to some criticism over the lack of creativity. The Mosque in Gunja was damaged during the 2014 Southeast Europe floods. The site was visited by ambassadors of Azerbaijan, Indonesia and Iran to Croatia who were led by mufti of Zagreb. While local religious leadership requested and expressed dissatisfaction over the lack of reconstruction funding from the Government of Croatia, object was ultimately reconstructed by an €165,000 donation of the Republic of Turkey. Since 2017 the mosque organizes annual Evenings of Spiritual Music in which students from elementary school in Gunja as well as representatives of Serbian Orthodox and Roman Catholic community from the village and the rest of the region take part. On the occasion of 50th anniversary of the Gunja Mosque local Muslim religious leader imam Idriz ef. Bešić received life achievement award of the Vukovar-Srijem County for 38 years of his service in Gunja.

== See also ==
- Islam in Croatia
