= Jamena =

Jamena Јамена (Serbian)
- Village (Selo)
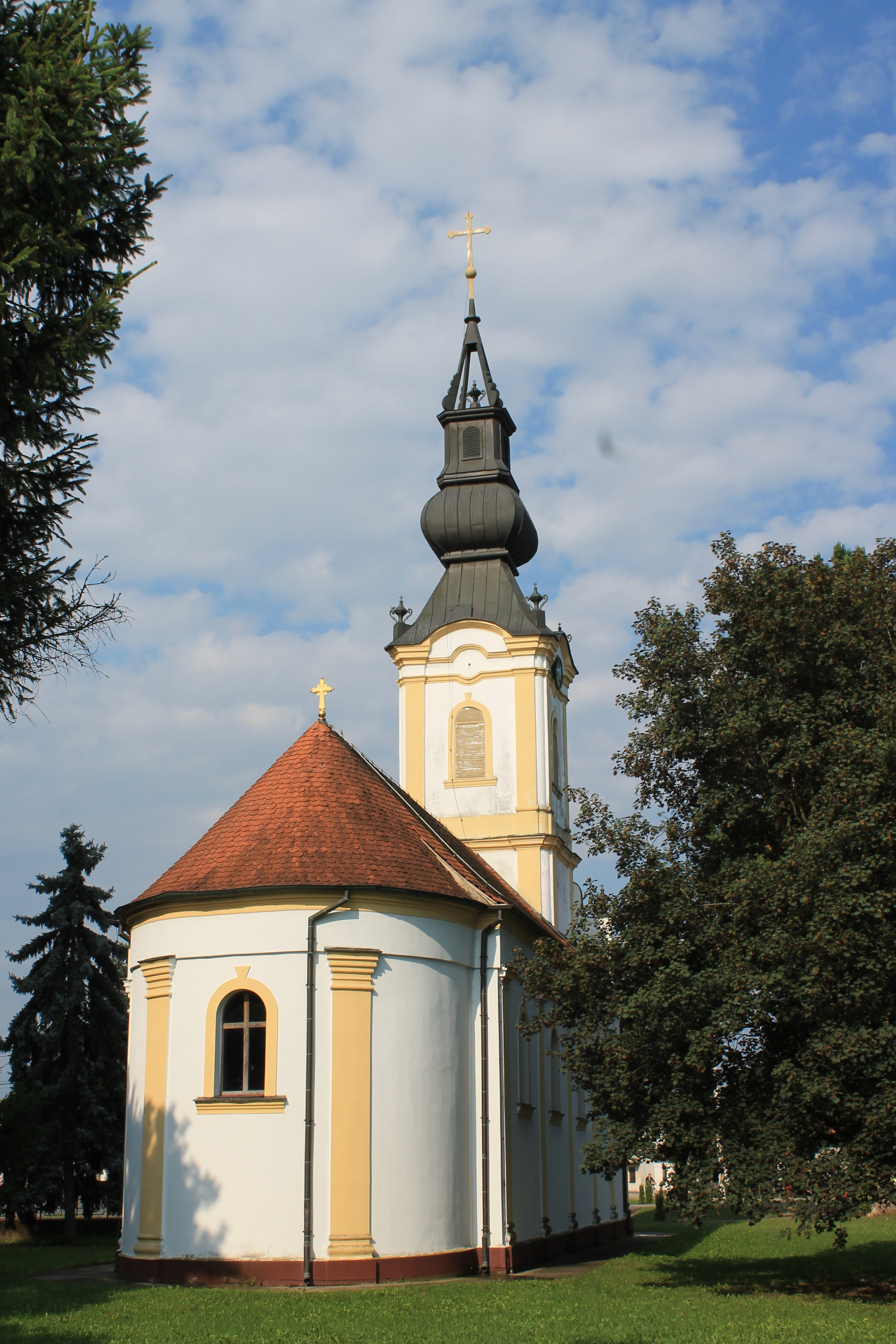
- Serbian Orthodox Church in Jamena

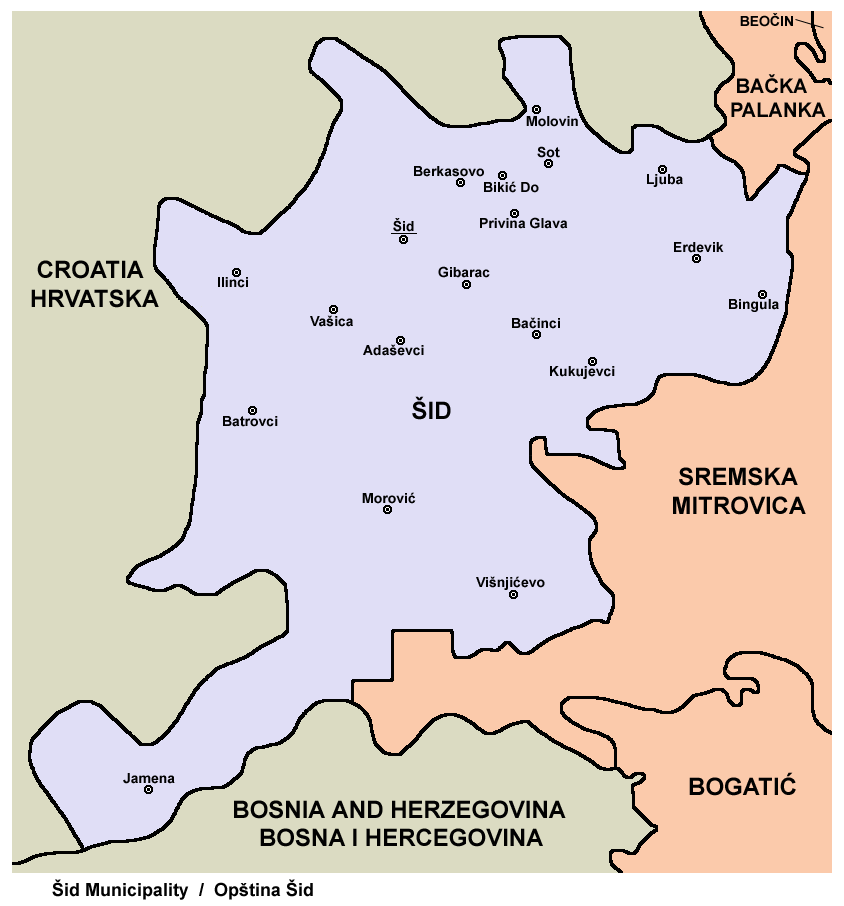
- Location of Jamena in Šid municipality

- Location within Vojvodina Location within Serbia Location within Europe
- Coordinates: 44°53′N 19°4′E
- Country: Serbia
- Province: Vojvodina
- Region: Syrmia
- District: Srem
- Municipality: Šid

Area
  - Total: 75.99 km^{2} (29.34 sq mi)
- Elevation: 75 m (246 ft)

Population (2011)
  - Total: 950
  - Density: 13/km^{2} (32/sq mi)
- Time zone: UTC+1 (CET)
  - Summer (DST): UTC+2 (CEST)

Jamena (Serbian Cyrillic: Јамена) is a village located in the municipality of Šid, Srem District, Vojvodina, Serbia. As of 2011 census, it has a population of 950 inhabitants. It is the only place in Serbia that borders both Croatia and Bosnia and Hercegovina (Republika Srpska) forming a geographic salient.

== History ==
The history of the village dates back to Roman times as a military outpost on the river Sava (Savus River) against the Illyrians. The village has been destroyed and resurrected many times in its history. During World War II in 1943, Jamena was burned to the ground by the Croatian Nazi collaborators - the Ustashe. 2500 civilians were brutally murdered in a two-day rampage; there is a monument to the victims in the center of Jamena. The area and the surrounding forests where the scene of Partisan guerilla activity during World War II, there is a monument to the fighters on the side of the road heading towards Jamena near the army barracks. Since 1945, Jamena has flourished as a wealthy agricultural village on the outskirts of Serbia (Vojvodina).

When Yugoslavia broke apart in 1991, Jamena lost its direct road to Morović and the rest of Serbia, because the only roads from the village go to Račinovci and Strošinci which are in Croatia. During the Yugoslav wars (1991–1995), the village was practically isolated from the rest of Serbia. The natality rate has been falling steadily and the village has rapidly declined in population. It was bombed in 1999 by Nato forces who killed one civilian. In the last few years, the population has steadied because of the people from abroad who have been working for years in Western Europe and who started building new homes in the village. Nowadays, the village is connected to the rest of Serbia by route 128.

== Demographics & Historical population ==
- 1961: 1,586
- 1971: 1,771
- 1981: 1,577
- 1991: 1,399
- 2002: 1,130
- 2011: 950

Ethnicity

- Serb 1055 ----- 93,36%
- Croat 32 ---- 2,83%
- Yugoslav 5 ---- 0,44%
- Rusyn 3 ---- 0,26%
- Hungarian 2---- 0,17%
- Montenegrin 1---- 0,08%
- Russian 1 ---- 0,08%
- Muslim 1 ---- 0,08%
- Macedonian 1 ---- 0,08%
- Unknown 8 ---- 0,70%

== Traffic ==
The village has a border crossing over the Sava river by ferry into Bosnia and Herzegovina (Republika Srpska) where some locals commute everyday to work in the Bijeljina area. It also borders Croatia, and there was a campaign to re-open the border with Croatia with the village of Strošinci in 2007, but as of 2010 nothing came of it, much to the dismay of residents from both sides of the border. There is a bus service that runs twice daily, in the morning and late afternoon, to the nearby town of Šid, from which people can travel to all major destinations in Serbia and neighbouring countries. Plans are under way to build a bridge over the river Sava to Bosnia and Hercegovina, construction should start in early 2008. To reach Jamena there is only one road from Morović which cuts through the forest and runs for approximately 20 km.

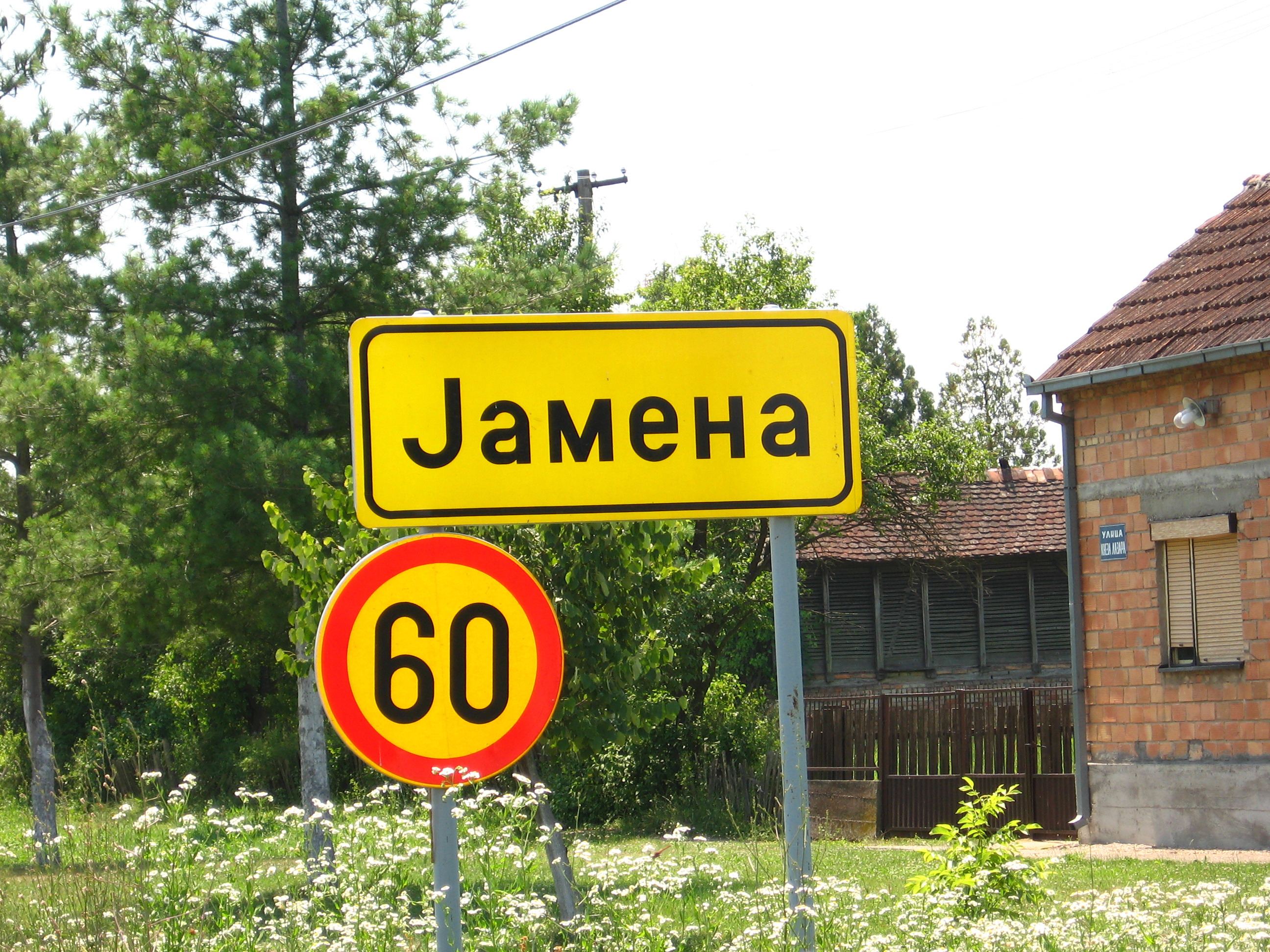

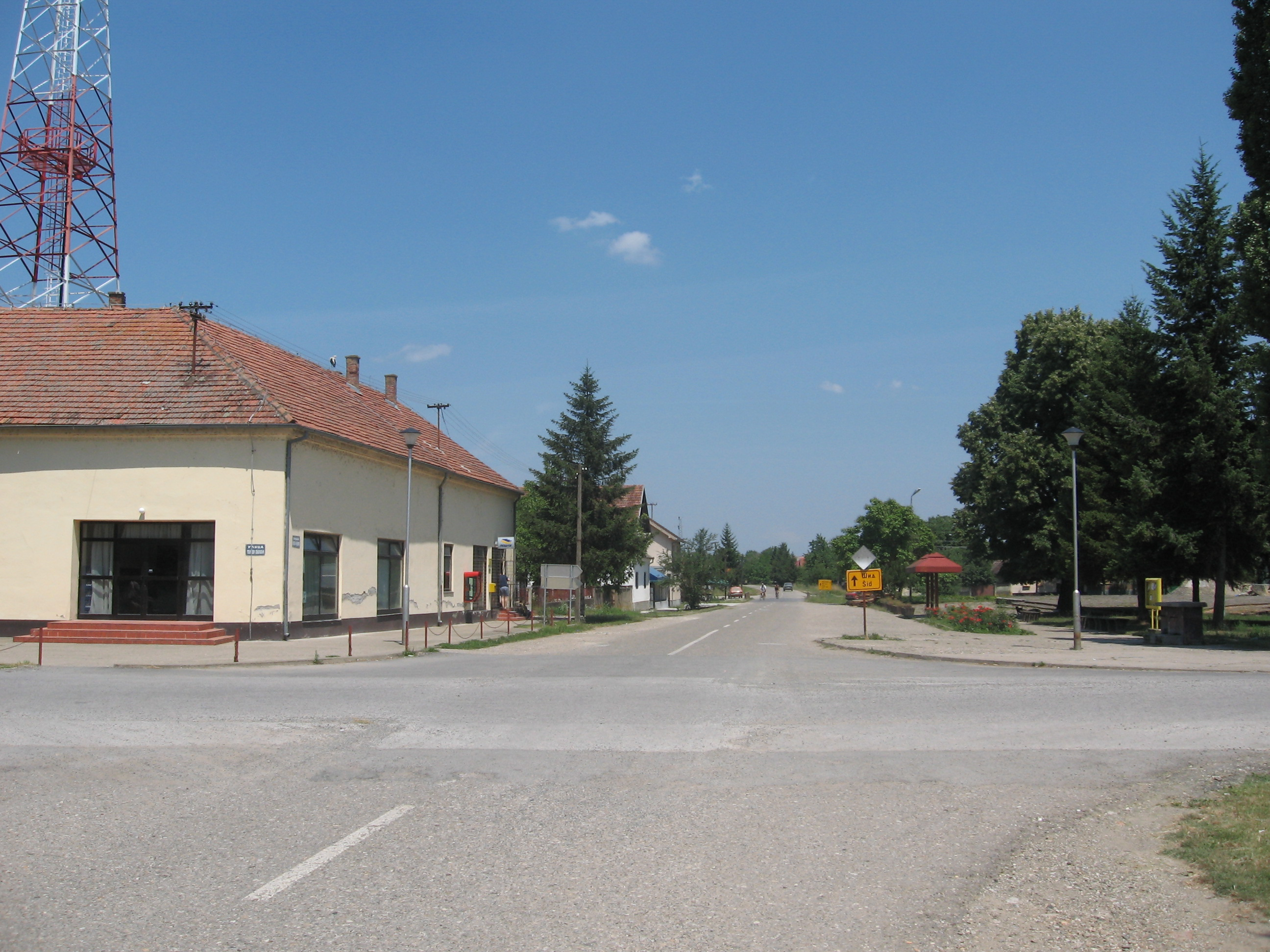

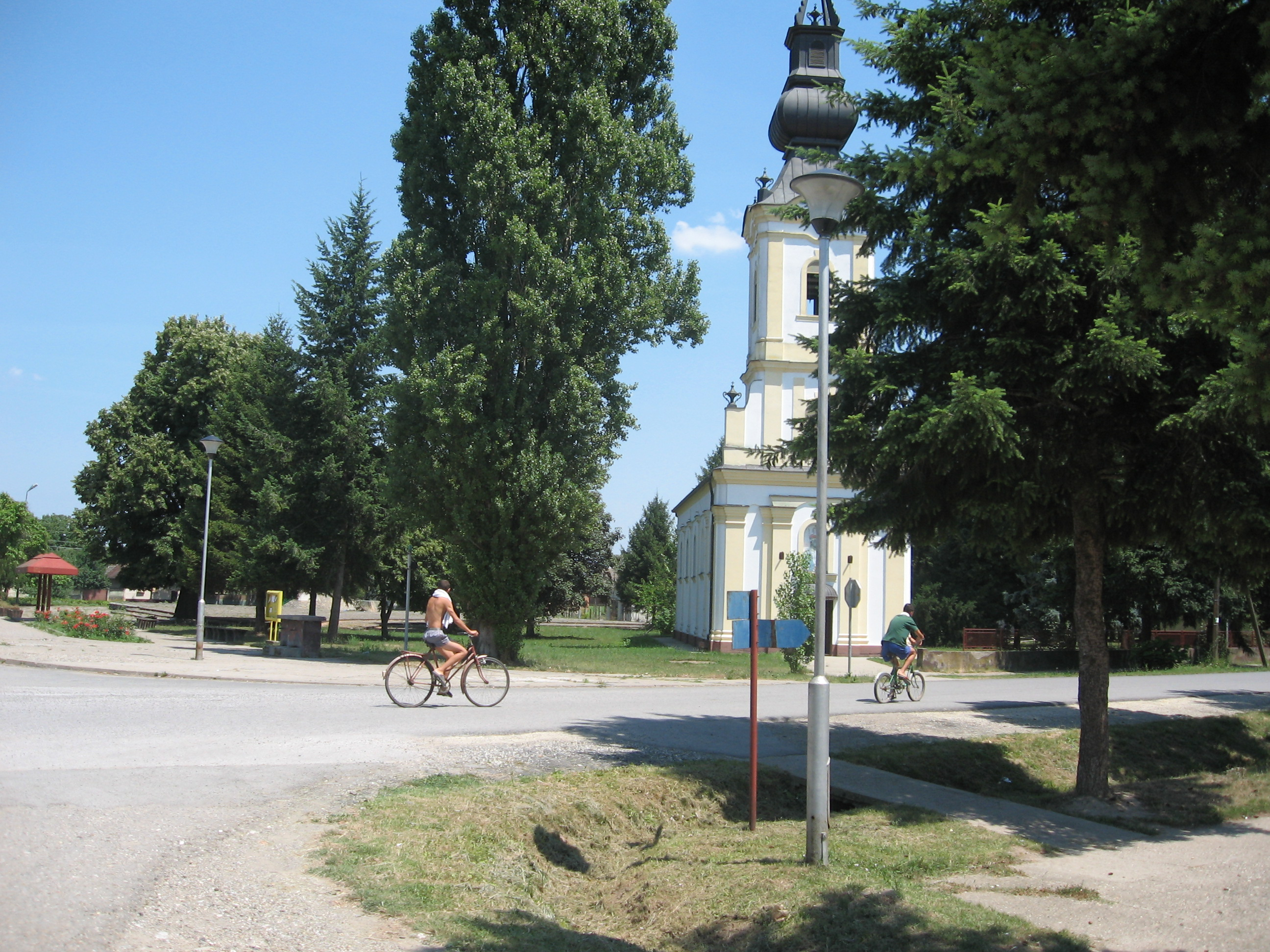

== Sports and hunting ==
The football team plays under the name of FK Graničar Jamena ("graničar" means "frontiermen" in Serbian) and was formed in 1930. It currently competes in the Šid league, the club colors are red and white. Its ground has seating and shelter for about 300 spectators as well as standing areas. Every summer there is a mini pitch football tournament on the local courts in the village center. Other clubs include the "Sava" hunting club due to the large amount of game in the surrounding forests; game include deer, wild boar and pheasants. It shares the same forest often referred to as Tito's hunting ground with Morović. The area is also well known as a fishing area due to its close proximity to the Sava river as well as the Bosut river. There is also a ramp for launching boats on the Sava river in Jamena. As the village is located next to the Sava river there is a dedicated area for swimmers and bathers along the bank of the river about 200 meters upstream from the ferry crossing to Bosnia.

== Economy and features ==
The village is largely agricultural as the soil around Jamena is very fertile, the main crops being corn, soy, wheat. The main stock breed and sold out of the village are hogs which are generally sold to large wholesalers for retail sale. The village contains 4 bars and 4 general stores as well as a local post office and a medical, dental and veterinary clinic.

== See also ==
- List of places in Serbia
- List of cities, towns and villages in Vojvodina
- Srem
- Syrmia
