= Cvelferija =

Microregion in eastern Croatia

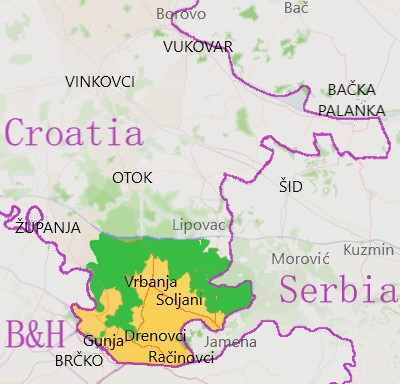
Cvelferija

Cvelferija is a geographic region in Croatian part of Syrmia, in eastern Croatia. Villages in the region are Gunja, Vrbanja, Soljani, Strošinci, Đurići, Račinovci, Rajevo Selo, Posavski Podgajci and Drenovci, which are better known as “the heart of Cvelferija“.

The name for the region comes from the German word zwölf or twelve. Specifically, villages were part of the Slavonian Military Frontier in the past, where they were part of the Twelfth Company of the Frontier. At that time this region was bordering the Ottoman Empire, while in the present the region borders Bosnia-Herzegovina (to the south) and Serbia (to the east).

The whole region is administratively located within the Vukovar-Srijem County, on its southern edge.

Every year in one of these villages, the cultural event Raspjevana Cvelferija (in English: 'Singing Cvelferija') takes place. The event is attended by folklore groups from Cvelferija and their guests.

== Population ==
Settlement	Population 2001	Population 2011
Vrbanja	2,952	2,203
Soljani	1,554	1,245
Strošinci	668	492
Drenovci	3,049	1,946
Đurići	418	286
Račinovci	982	700
Gunja	5,033	3,732
Rajevo Selo	1,407	987
Posavski Podgajci	1,568	1,255
TOTAL	17,631	12,846

== See also ==
- Geography of Croatia
- Jamena
