= D55 road =

Road in Croatia

D55 state road

Route information
- Length: 48.6 km (30.2 mi)

Major junctions
- From: D2 in Vukovar
- D46 in Vinkovci; A3 at the Županja interchange D214 in Županja
- To: Županja border crossing to Bosnia and Herzegovina

Location
- Country: Croatia
- Counties: Vukovar-Srijem
- Major cities: Vukovar, Vinkovci, Županja

Highway system
- Highways in Croatia

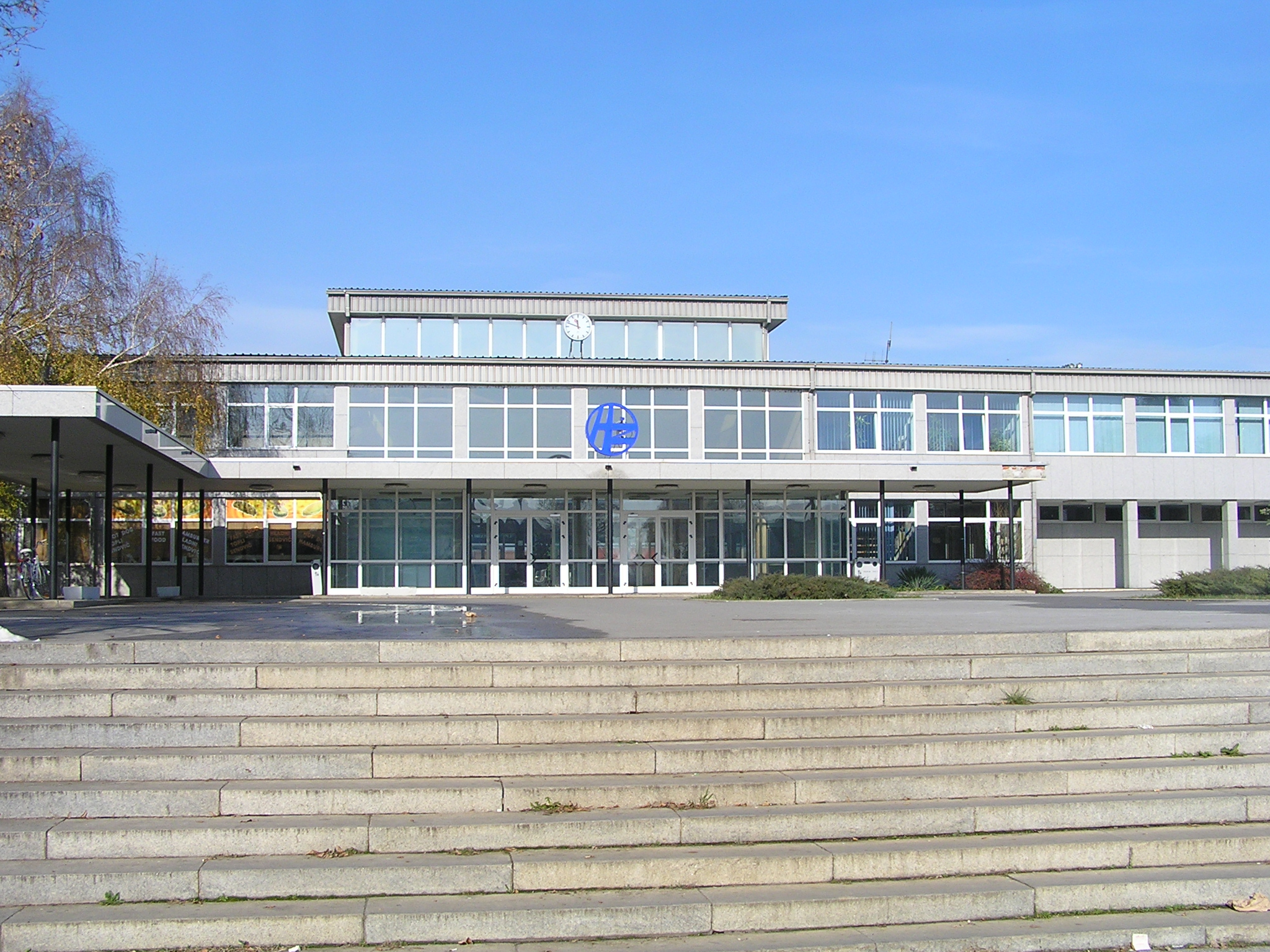
Vinkovci, on the D55 route

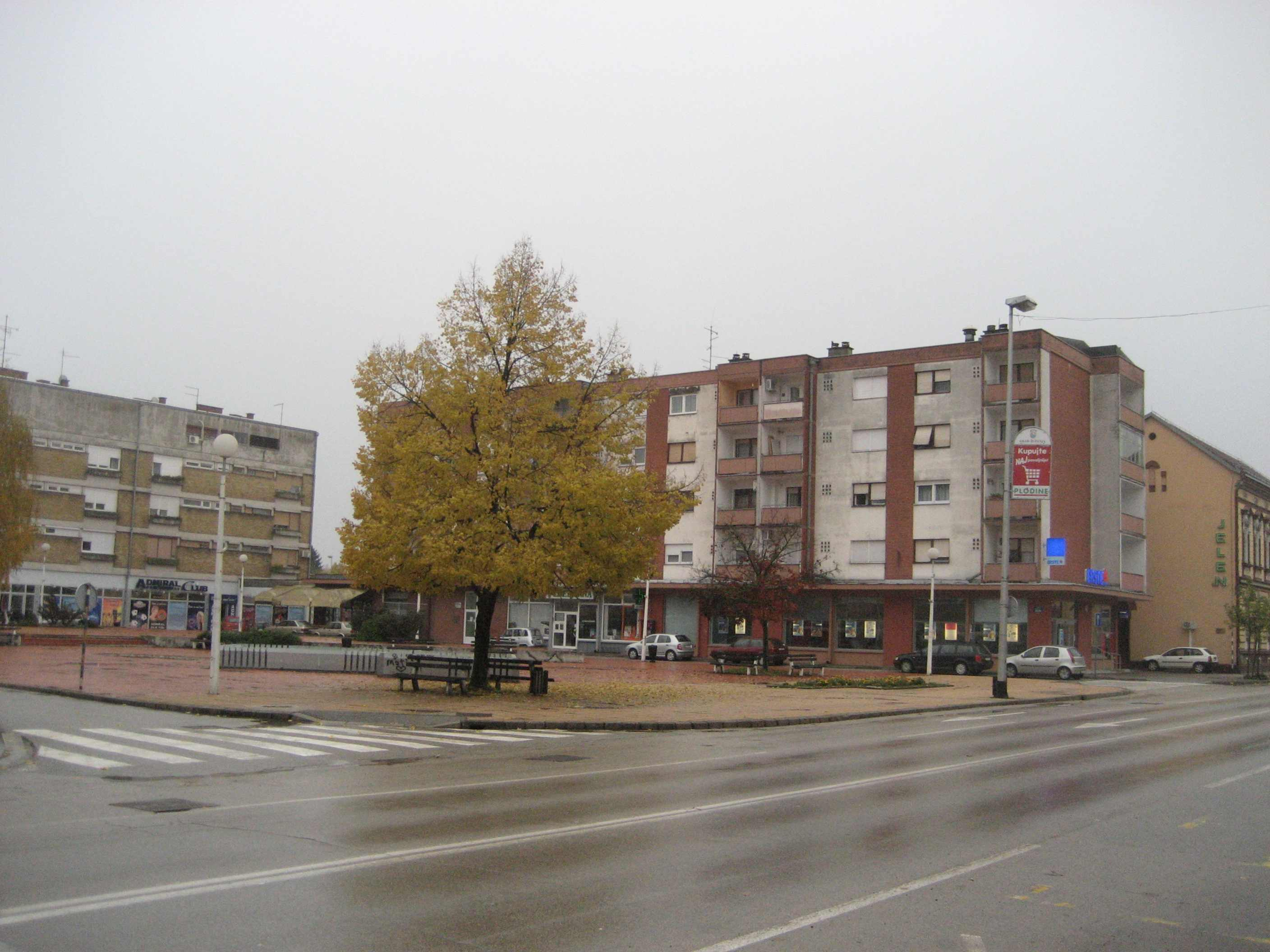
Županja, on the D55 route

D55 state road in the eastern part of Croatia connects the cities and towns of Vukovar, Vinkovci, Županja to the state road network of Croatia, and most notably to the A3 motorway. The road is 48.6 km (30.2 mi) long. The route comprises some urban intersections, mostly in the city of Vinkovci.

The D55 state road intersects the Vukovar-Srijem County exactly through an area that connects the regions of Slavonia and Syrmia.

The D55, indeed like all state roads in Croatia, is managed and maintained by Hrvatske ceste, state-owned company.

== Traffic volume ==
Traffic is regularly counted and reported by Hrvatske ceste, operator of the road.

D55 traffic volume
Road	Counting site	AADT	ASDT	Notes
D55	3706 Nuštar	8,739	8,738	Adjacent to Ž4134 junction.
D55	3710 Kunjevci	6,199	-	Adjacent to Ž4192 junction. Estimate by Hrvatske ceste.
D55	3719 Županja	5,495	6,781	The southernmost traffic counting site on the D55 road, adjacent to the border crossing.

== Road junctions and populated areas ==
D55 junctions/populated areas
Type	Slip roads/Notes
	Vukovar; D2 to Osijek (to the northwest) and to Ilok (to the southeast). The northern terminus of the road.
	Bršadin
	Ž4111 to Pačetin, Bobota and Vera
	Nuštar; Ž4134 to Ostrovo and Gaboš. Ž4136 to Cerić. Ž4137 to Bogdanovci.
	Vinkovci; D46 to Đakovo and Tovarnik. Ž4136 to Cerić. Ž4169 entirely within Vinkovci. Ž4171 entirely within Vinkovci. Ž4290 entirely within Vinkovci.
	Ž4290 to Vinkovci and D46 as a bypass road.
	Ž4192 to Rokovci.
	Ž4193 to Privlaka.
	Ž4222 to Gradište.
	A3 in Županja interchange, to Slavonski Brod and Zagreb (to the west) and to Lipovac and Belgrade, Serbia (to the east).
	Županja; D214 to Gunja and Brčko, Bosnia and Herzegovina. Ž4170 to Gradište and Cerna.
	Županja border crossing. The southern terminus of the road. Bosnia and Herzegovina M-1.8 road to Orašje.
