= Đurići =

- Village
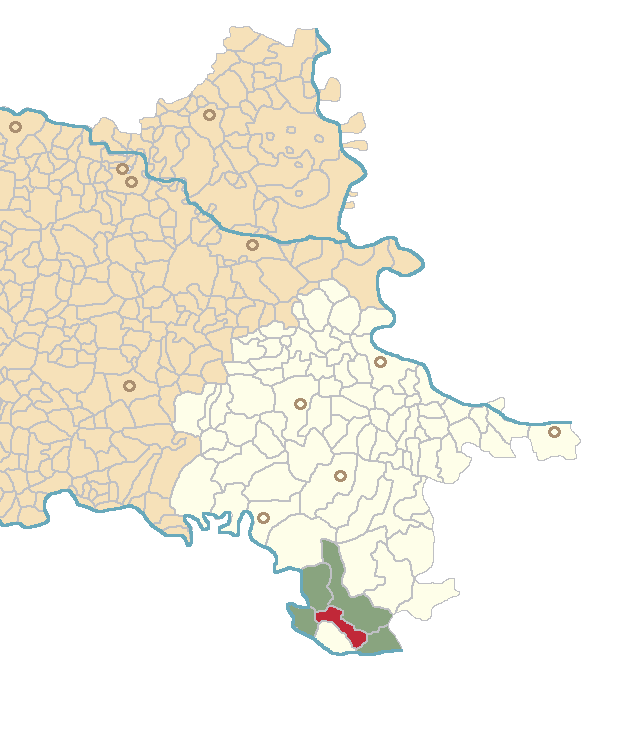

- Location within Vukovar-Syrmia County Location within Croatia Location within Europe
- Coordinates: 44.879674°N 18.912728°E
- Country: Croatia
- County: Vukovar-Syrmia
- Municipality: Drenovci

Area
  - Total: 25.9 km^{2} (10.0 sq mi)

Population (2021)
  - Total: 206
  - Density: 7.95/km^{2} (20.6/sq mi)
- Time zone: UTC+1 (CET)
  - Summer (DST): UTC+2 (CEST)

Đurići is a village in eastern Croatia, located south of Drenovci.

== Name ==
The name of the village in Croatian is plural.

== See also ==
- Vukovar-Syrmia County
- Cvelferija
