= Vrbanja, Croatia =

Vrbanja
- Municipality
- Municipality of Vrbanja; Općina Vrbanja
- Flag Seal

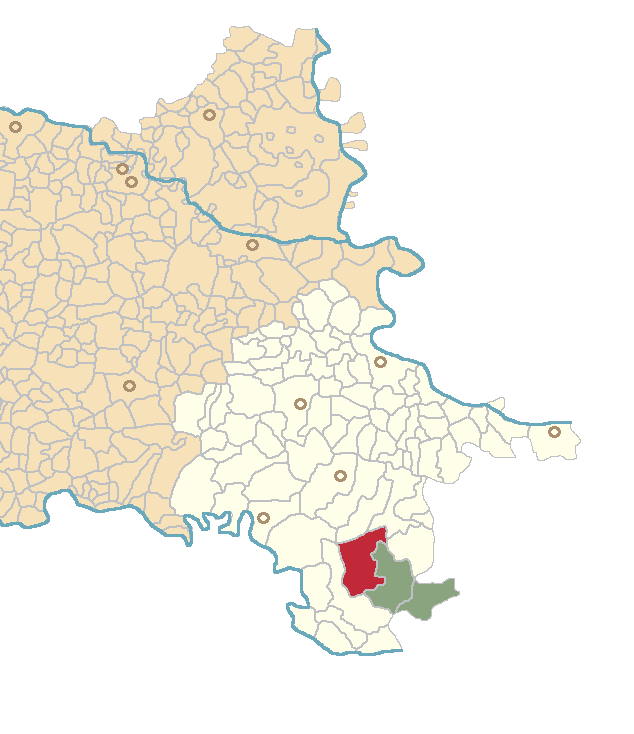

- Location in Croatia Vrbanja (Croatia) Vrbanja (Europe)
- Coordinates: 44°59′N 18°56′E
- Country: Croatia
- County: Vukovar-Syrmia County

Government
  - Mayor: Ivica Sep (HDZ)

Area
  - Municipality: 191.3 km^{2} (73.9 sq mi)
  - Urban: 71.0 km^{2} (27.4 sq mi)
- Elevation: 87 m (285 ft)

Population (2021)
  - Municipality: 2,870
  - Density: 15.0/km^{2} (38.9/sq mi)
  - Urban: 1,583
  - Urban density: 22.3/km^{2} (57.7/sq mi)
- Time zone: UTC+1 (CET)
  - Summer (DST): UTC+2 (CEST)
- Postal code: 32254
- Area code: 32
- Vehicle registration: ŽU
- Website: opcina-vrbanja.hr

Vrbanja (Slovak: Vrbanja, Hungarian: Vérbánya) is a village and a municipality in Croatia.

== Etymology ==
Vrbanja is named after the Croatian word for willows (vrbe).

== Population ==
The municipality has a population of 5,174, in the following settlements:

- Soljani, population 1,245
- Strošinci, population 492
- Vrbanja, population 2,203

By ethnicity, 96.48% are Croats, while the largest minority consists of Slovaks (1.38%), per census 2001. With pronounced issue of population decline in eastern Croatia caused by population ageing, effects of the Croatian War of Independence and emigration after the accession of Croatia to the European Union, the population of the municipality dropped to 2,870 residents at the time of 2021 census.

== Notable people ==
Elizabeta Burg, Croatian Beauty Pageant and Miss Universe Top 16 finalist

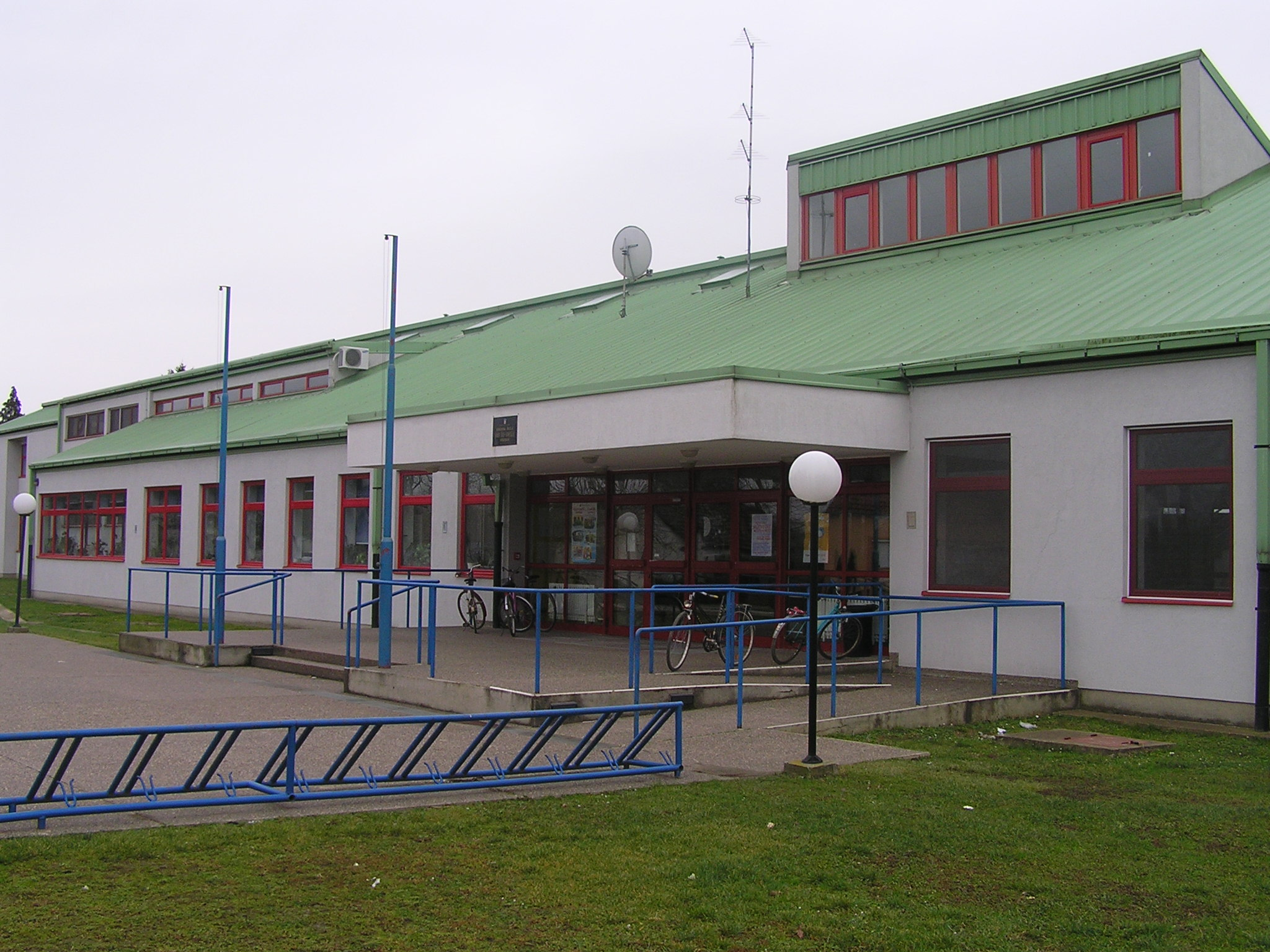
School in Vrbanja

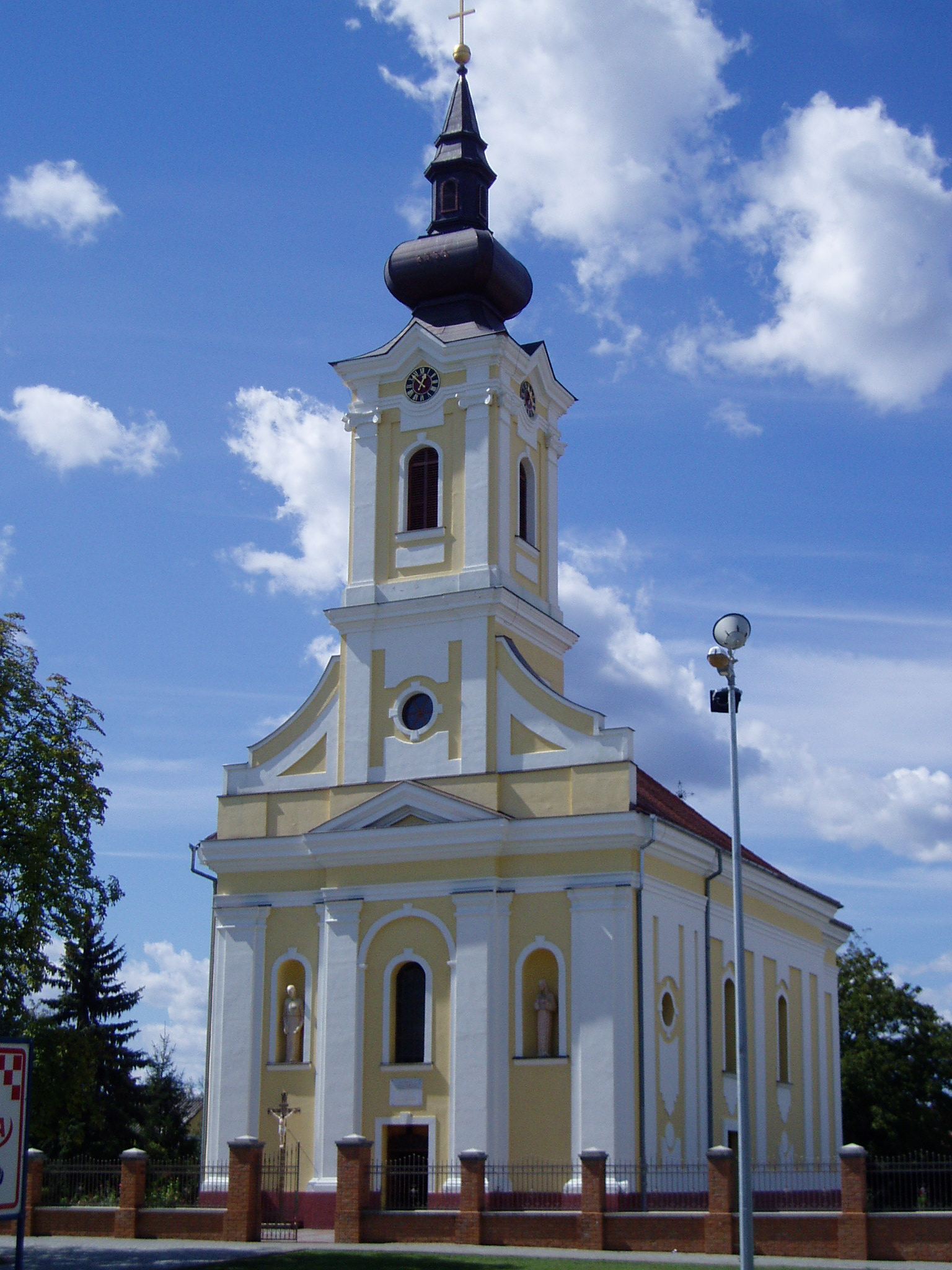
Church today

== See also ==
- Vukovar-Syrmia County
- Cvelferija
- Drenovci
