= Oštra Luka, Orašje =

Oštra Luka
- Village
- Location within Bosnia and Herzegovina
- Coordinates: 45.0012807°N 18.5682249°E
- Country: Bosnia and Herzegovina
- Entity: Federation of Bosnia and Herzegovina; Republika Srpska
- Canton Region: Posavina; Doboj
- Municipality: Orašje [[]]

Area
  - Total: 5.44 sq mi (14.08 km^{2})

Population (2013)
  - Total: 2,507
  - Density: 461.2/sq mi (178.1/km^{2})
- Time zone: UTC+1 (CET)
  - Summer (DST): UTC+2 (CEST)

Oštra Luka is a village in the municipalities of Orašje (Federation of Bosnia and Herzegovina) and Donji Žabar (Republika Srpska), Bosnia and Herzegovina.

== Demographics ==
According to the 2013 census, its population was 2,507, with 912 of them living in the Donji Žabar part and 1,595 in the Orašje part.

Ethnicity in 2013
Ethnicity	Number	Percentage
Croats	2.476	98.8%
Serbs	11	0.4%
Bosniaks	5	0.2%
other/undeclared	15	0.6%
Total	2,507	100%
