= Strošinci =

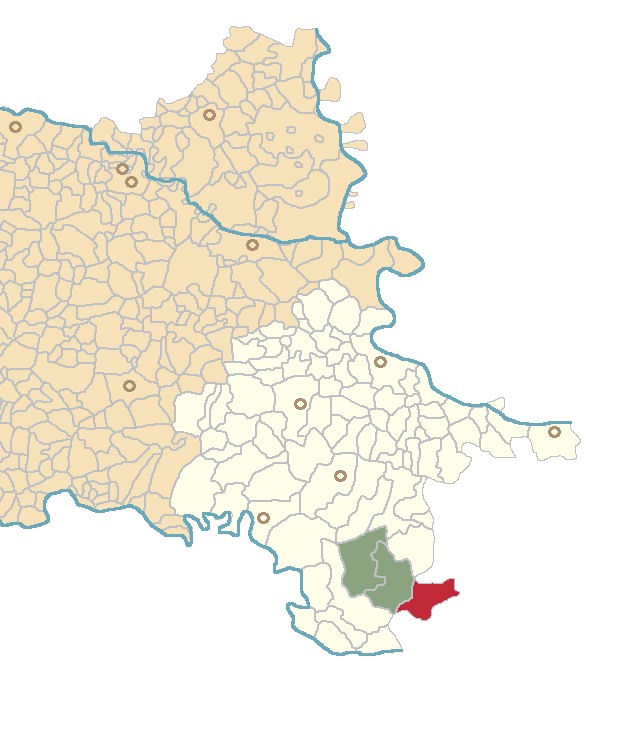

- Coordinates: 44.916899°N 19.062441°E
- Country: Croatia
- County: Vukovar-Syrmia
- Municipality: Vrbanja

Area
  - Total: 52.3 km^{2} (20.2 sq mi)

Population (2021)
  - Total: 361
  - Density: 6.90/km^{2} (17.9/sq mi)

Strošinci is a village in eastern Croatia located southeast of Vrbanja and forming a geographic salient surrounded by Serbia. The population is 492 (census 2011).

== Name ==
The name of the village in Croatian is plural.

== History ==
9 kilometres long local forest road connecting Strošinci with Soljani was completed in December of 1958.

== Notable natives and residents ==
- Ivan Cvjetković
- Radivoje Ognjanović

== See also ==
- Vukovar-Syrmia County
- Cvelferija
