= Vražići, Čelić =

Vražići Вражићи
- Village
- Location within Bosnia and Herzegovina
- Coordinates: 44°44′N 18°45′E
- Country: Bosnia and Herzegovina
- Entity: Federation of Bosnia and Herzegovina
- Canton: Tuzla
- Municipality: Čelić

Area
  - Total: 4.77 sq mi (12.36 km^{2})

Population (2013)
  - Total: 1,256
  - Density: 263.2/sq mi (101.6/km^{2})
- Time zone: UTC+1 (CET)
  - Summer (DST): UTC+2 (CEST)

Vražići (Cyrillic: Вражићи) is a village in the municipality of Čelić, Bosnia and Herzegovina.

== Demographics ==
According to the 2013 census, its population was 1,256.

Ethnicity in 2013
Ethnicity	Number	Percentage
Bosniaks	1,239	98.6%
other/undeclared	17	1.4%
Total	1,256	100%
