= Grebnice =

Grebnice Гребнице (Serbian)
- Village (Selo)
- Location within Bosnia and Herzegovina
- Coordinates: 45°02′08″N 18°31′08″E
- Country: Bosnia and Herzegovina
- Entity: Federation of Bosnia and Herzegovina
- Administrative District: Posavina Canton
- Municipality: Domaljevac-Šamac

Area
  - Total: 4.53 sq mi (11.73 km^{2})

Population (2013)
  - Total: 1,358
  - Density: 299.8/sq mi (115.8/km^{2})
- Time zone: UTC+1 (CET)
  - Summer (DST): UTC+2 (CEST)

Grebnice (Serbian Cyrillic: Гребнице) is a village mostly located in Domaljevac-Šamac, Federation of Bosnia and Herzegovina, Bosnia and Herzegovina. However about a third of it is located in Šamac, which belongs to the Republika Srpska.

== Demographics ==
According to the 2013 census, its population was 1,358, with 455 living in the Šamac part and 903 in the Domaljevac-Šamac part.

Ethnicity in 2013
Ethnicity	Number	Percentage
Croats	1,276	94.0%
Serbs	78	5.7%
Bosniaks	1	0.1%
other/undeclared	3	0.2%
Total	1,358	100%
