= Račinovci =

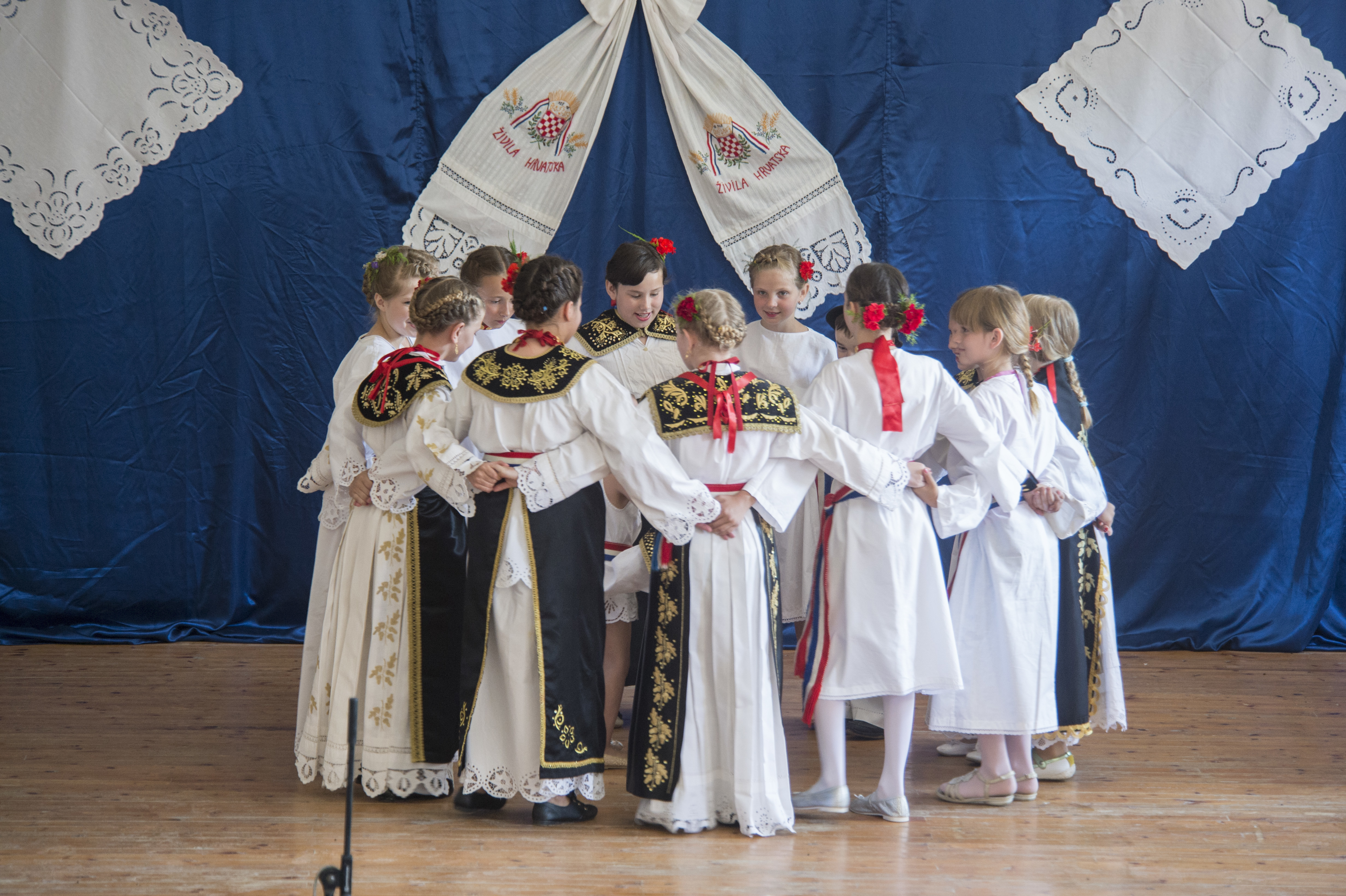

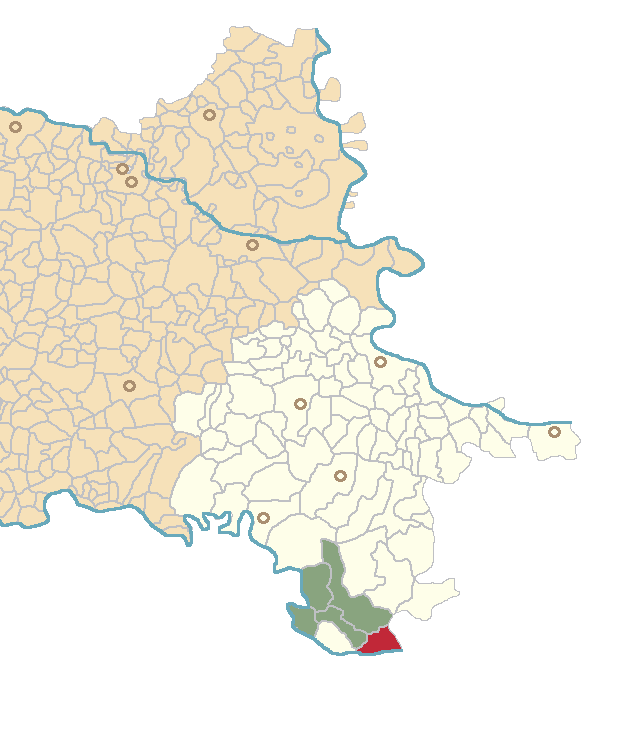

- Location within Croatia
- Coordinates: 44.863481°N 18.956285°E
- Country: Croatia
- County: Vukovar-Syrmia
- Municipality: Drenovci

Area
  - Total: 33.0 km^{2} (12.7 sq mi)

Population (2021)
  - Total: 517
  - Density: 15.7/km^{2} (40.6/sq mi)

Račinovci is a village in eastern Croatia located southeast of Drenovci, by the border with Bosnia and Herzegovina and Serbia. The population is 700 (census 2011).

== Name ==
The name of the village in Croatian is plural.

== Climate ==
Since records began in 2007, the highest temperature recorded at the local weather station was 39.6 °C (103.3 °F), on 4 August 2017. The coldest temperature was −26.0 °C (−14.8 °F), on 9 February 2012.

== See also ==
- Vukovar-Syrmia County
- Cvelferija

racinovci.com.hr
