= Drenovci =

- Municipality
- Municipality of Drenovci; Općina Drenovci
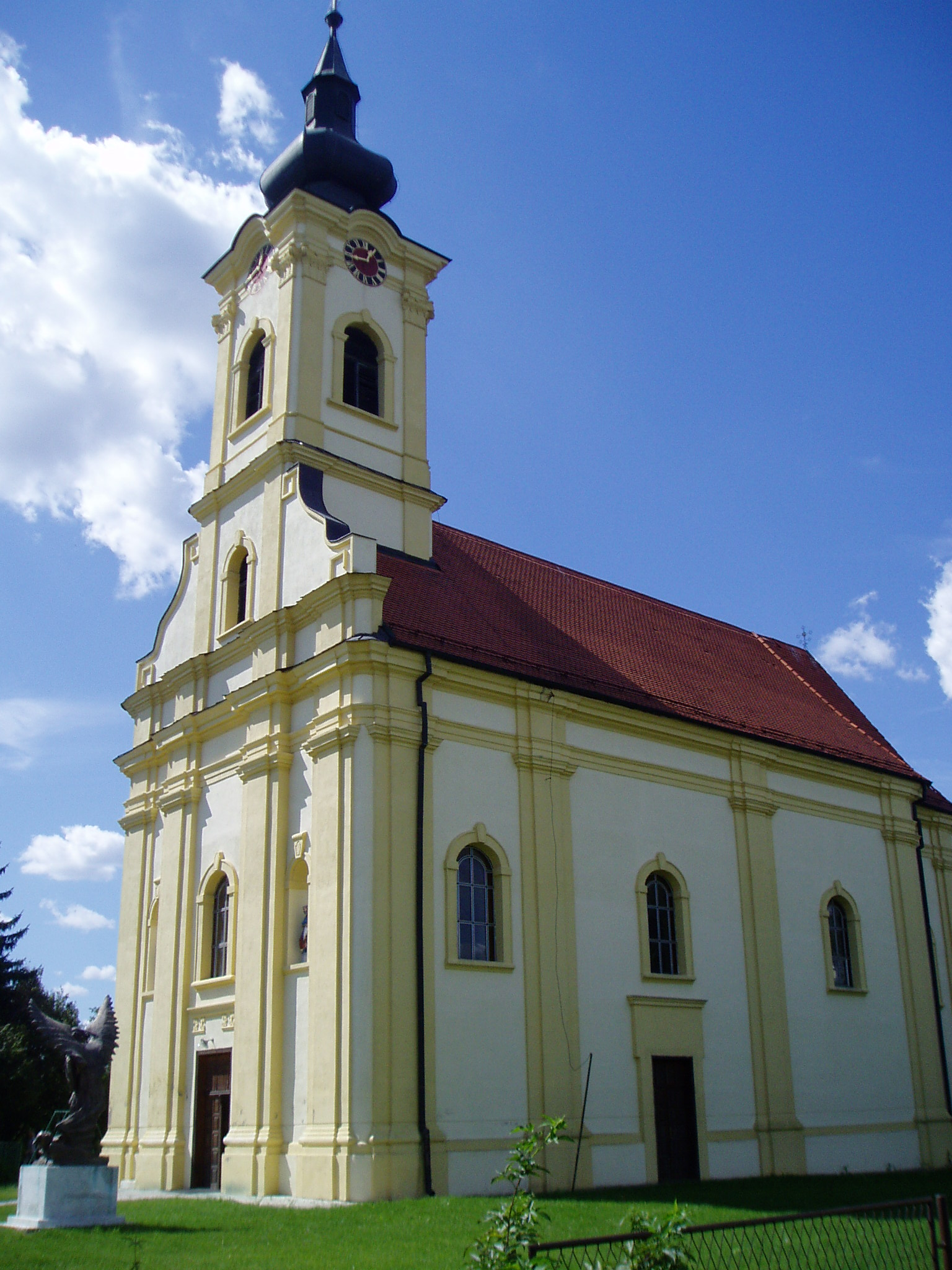

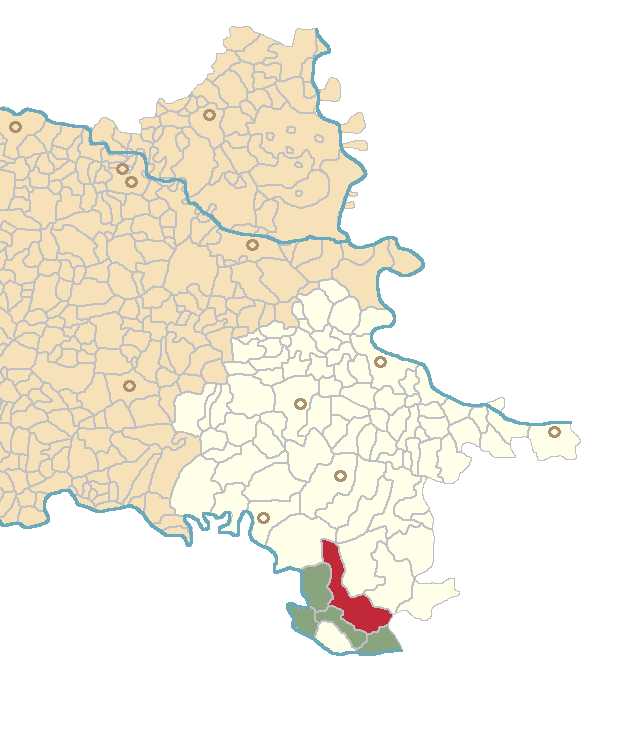

- Location in Croatia Drenovci (Croatia) Drenovci (Europe)
- Coordinates: 44°55′12″N 18°51′0″E
- Country: Croatia
- County: Vukovar-Syrmia County

Area
  - Municipality: 200.3 km^{2} (77.3 sq mi)
  - Urban: 74.9 km^{2} (28.9 sq mi)

Population (2021)
  - Municipality: 3,662
  - Density: 18.28/km^{2} (47.35/sq mi)
  - Urban: 1,398
  - Urban density: 18.7/km^{2} (48.3/sq mi)
- Time zone: UTC+1 (CET)
  - Summer (DST): UTC+2 (CEST)
- Postal code: ?
- Area code: 32
- Vehicle registration: VK
- Website: opcina-drenovci.hr

Drenovci (Hungarian: Drenóc, German: Drenowitz, Bosnian: Drenovci, Serbian Cyrillic: Дреновци) is a village and municipality in the Vukovar-Syrmia County in Croatia. The municipality is part of Slavonia.

== Population ==
According to the 2011 census, there are 5,174 inhabitants, in the following settlements:

- Drenovci, population 1,946
- Đurići, population 286
- Posavski Podgajci, population 1,255
- Račinovci, population 700
- Rajevo Selo, population 987

87.05% of the population are Croats.

== Politics ==
=== Minority councils ===
Directly elected minority councils and representatives are tasked with consulting tasks for the local or regional authorities in which they are advocating for minority rights and interests, integration into public life and participation in the management of local affairs. At the 2023 Croatian national minorities councils and representatives elections Bosniaks and Serbs of Croatia fulfilled legal requirements to elect 10 members minority councils of the Drenovci Municipality with Serb council remaining unelected due to lack of candidates.

== Name ==
The name of the village in Croatian is plural.

== See also ==
- Vukovar-Srijem County
- Cvelferija
