= Rajevo Selo =

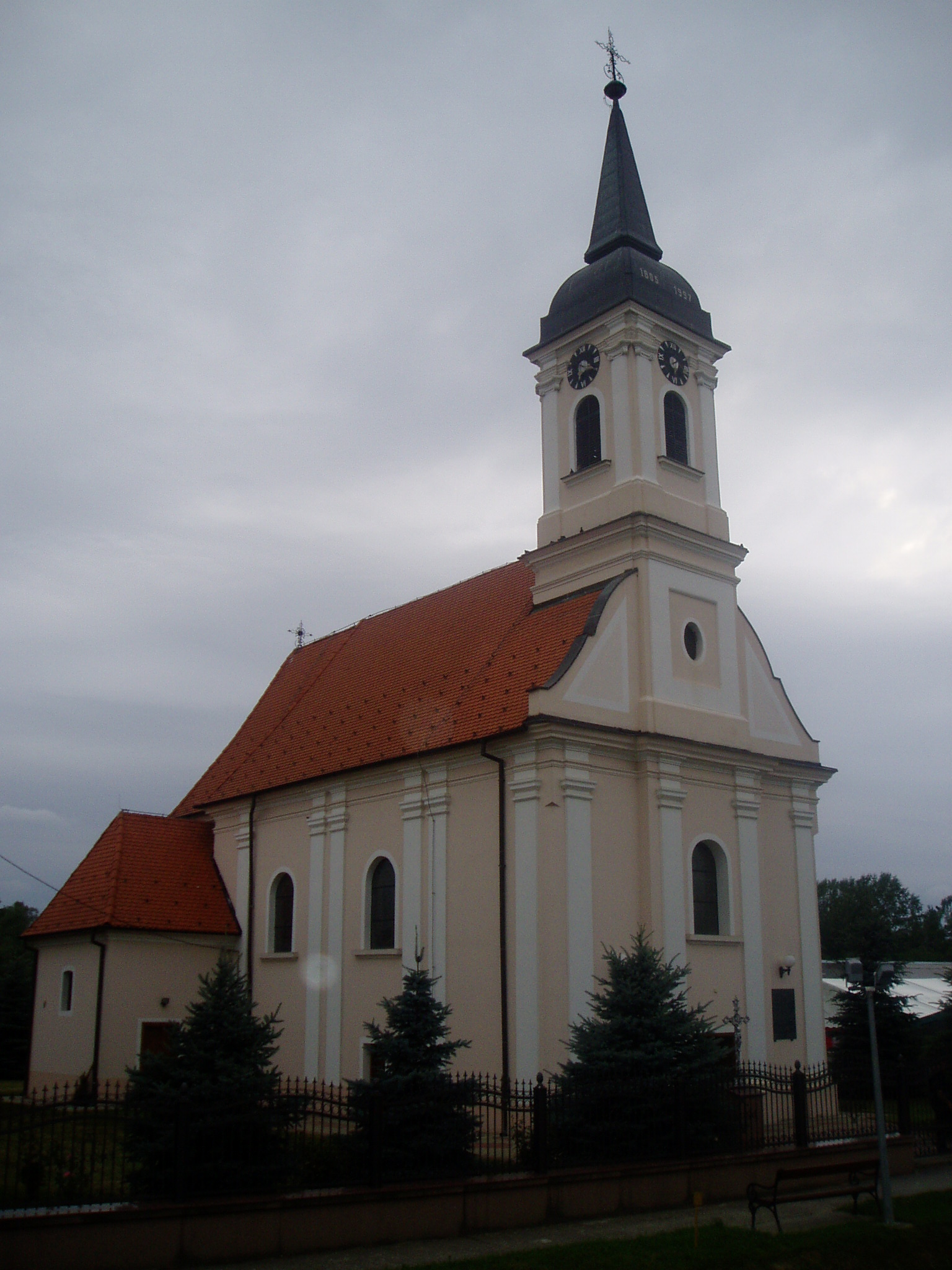

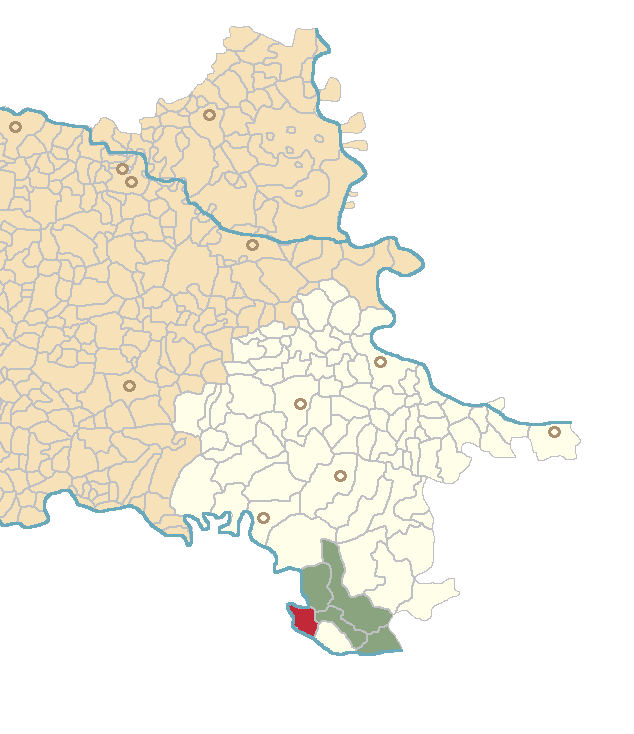

- Location within Vukovar-Syrmia County Location within Croatia Location within Europe
- Coordinates: 44.92588°N 18.777865°E
- Country: Croatia
- County: Vukovar-Syrmia
- Municipality: Drenovci

Area
  - Total: 23.9 km^{2} (9.2 sq mi)

Population (2021)
  - Total: 658
  - Density: 27.5/km^{2} (71.3/sq mi)

Rajevo Selo is a village in eastern Croatia located west of Drenovci, near the border with Bosnia and Herzegovina. The population is 658 (census 2021). The village lies on the Sava river, which marks here the international border between Croatia and Bosnia and Herzegovina with the village of Gorice on the other bank of the river.

== See also ==
- Vukovar-Syrmia County
- Cvelferija

== Notable people ==
- Miloš Božanović
