= Gunja, Croatia =

Gunja
- Municipality
- Municipality of Gunja; Općina Gunja
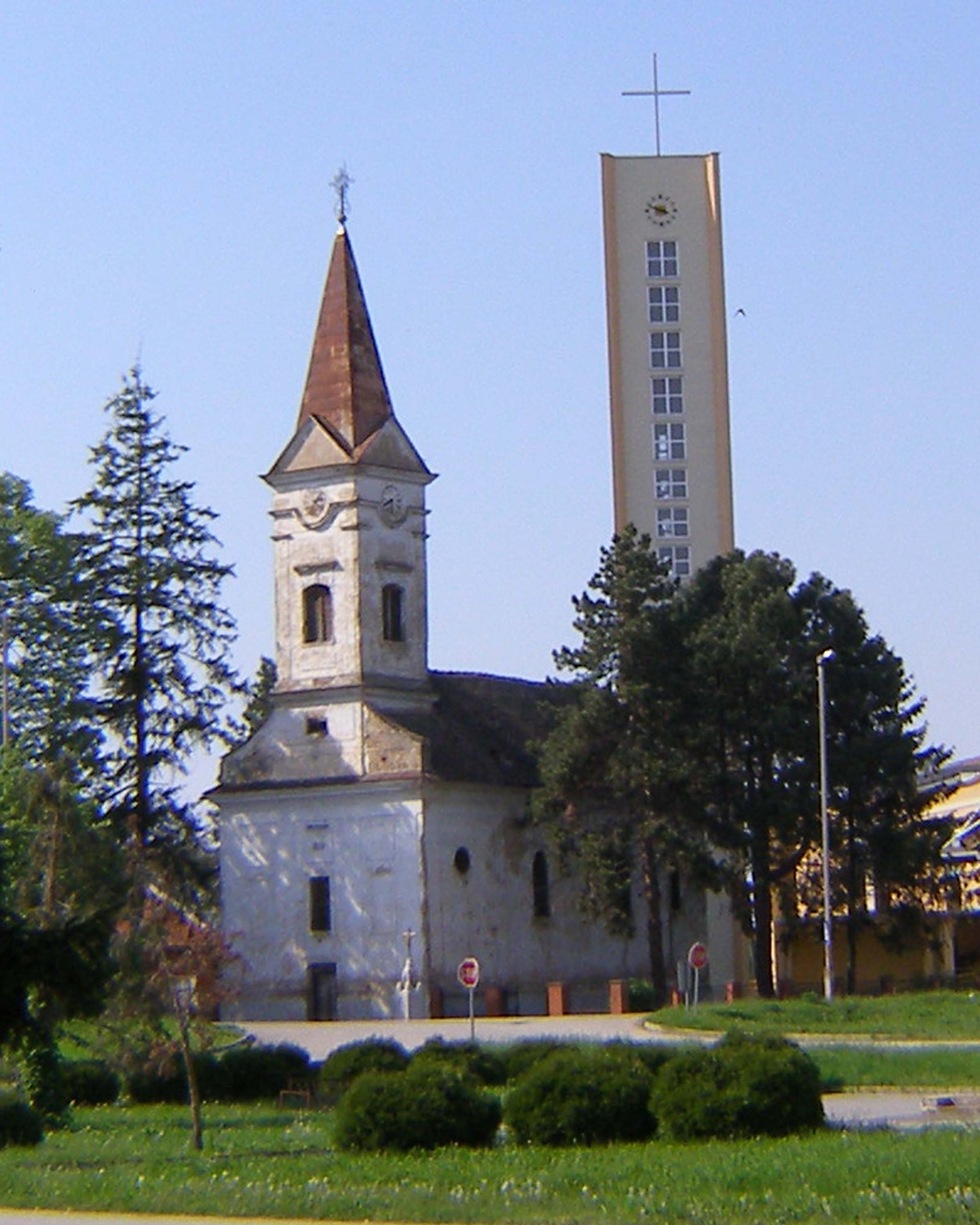
- The old church of St. Jacob with the new one in the background
- Interactive map of Gunja
- Location in Croatia Gunja (Croatia) Gunja (Europe)
- Coordinates: 44°53′48″N 18°51′0″E
- Country: Croatia
- County: Vukovar-Syrmia County

Government
  - Municipal mayor: Anto Gutić (HDZ)

Area
  - Municipality: 31.1 km^{2} (12.0 sq mi)
  - Urban: 31.1 km^{2} (12.0 sq mi)
- Elevation: 84 m (276 ft)

Population (2021)
  - Municipality: 2,600
  - Density: 84/km^{2} (220/sq mi)
  - Urban: 2,600
  - Urban density: 84/km^{2} (220/sq mi)
- Time zone: UTC+1 (CET)
  - Summer (DST): UTC+2 (CEST)
- Postal code: 32260 Gunja
- Area code: 32
- Vehicle registration: ŽU
- Website: gunja.hr

Gunja (Hungarian: Gúnya, Serbian Cyrillic: Гуња) is a village and municipality in Croatia.

In the 2011 census, the population was 3,732, with 60.13% declaring themselves Croats, 29.69% as Bosniaks, and 3.32% as Serbs.

The village lies directly across the Sava river from the city of Brčko in Bosnia and Herzegovina. During the Bosnian War, many Bosniak and Croat citizens of Brčko lived as refugees in Gunja. The village has a mosque, one of few in Croatia. The settlement was founded in the 18th century by settlers from eastern Bosnia.

Gunja was heavily hit by the 2014 Southeast Europe floods, with estimated property damage in excess of €50 million.

== Politics ==
=== Minority councils ===
Directly elected minority councils and representatives are tasked with consulting tasks for the local or regional authorities in which they are advocating for minority rights and interests, integration into public life and participation in the management of local affairs. At the 2023 Croatian national minorities councils and representatives elections Bosniaks and Serbs of Croatia fulfilled legal requirements to elect 10 members minority councils of the Gunja Municipality yet the Serb council elected only 8 members with Bosniak electing all 10.

== Gallery ==
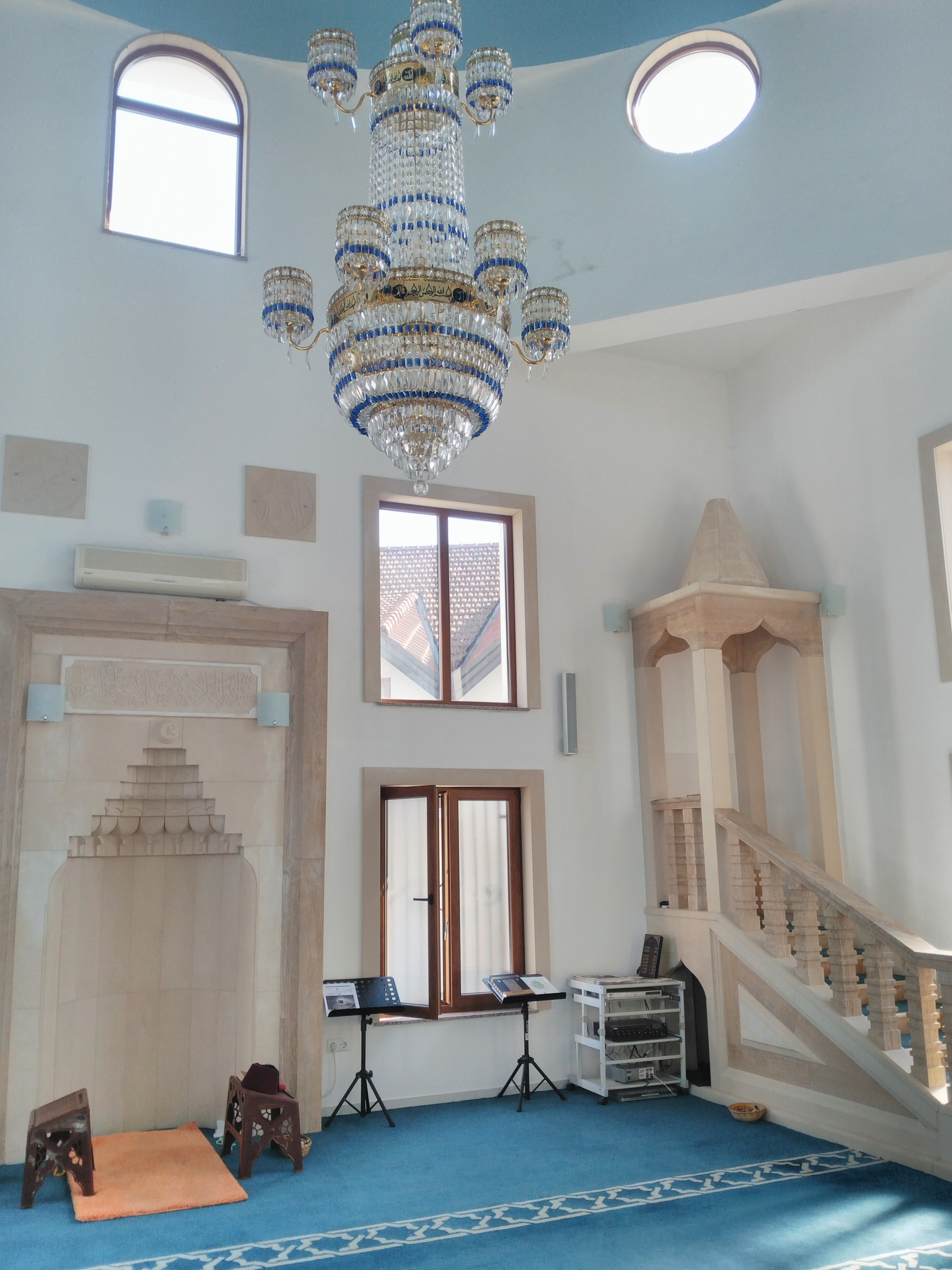
Gunja Mosque interior

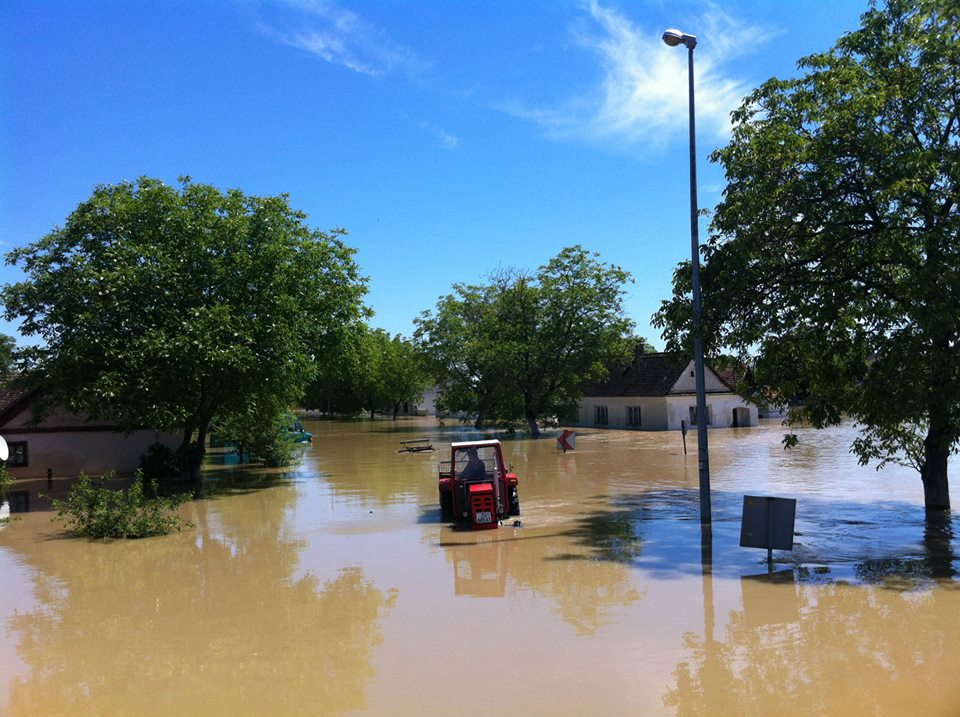
Floods in Gunja

== See also ==
- Gunja Mosque
- Vukovar-Syrmia County
- Cvelferija
