= Soljani =

- Village (Selo)
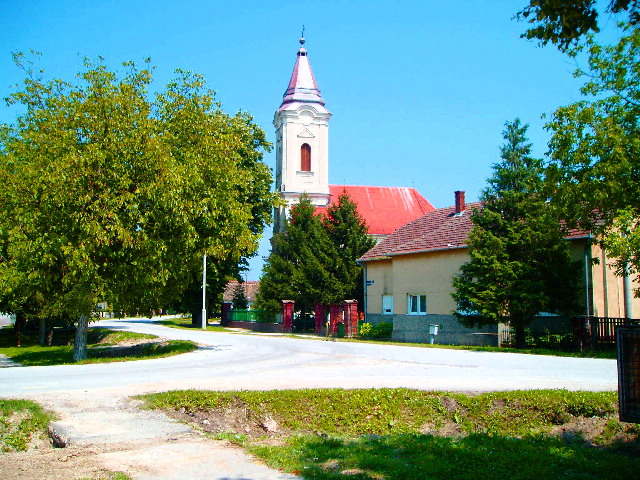

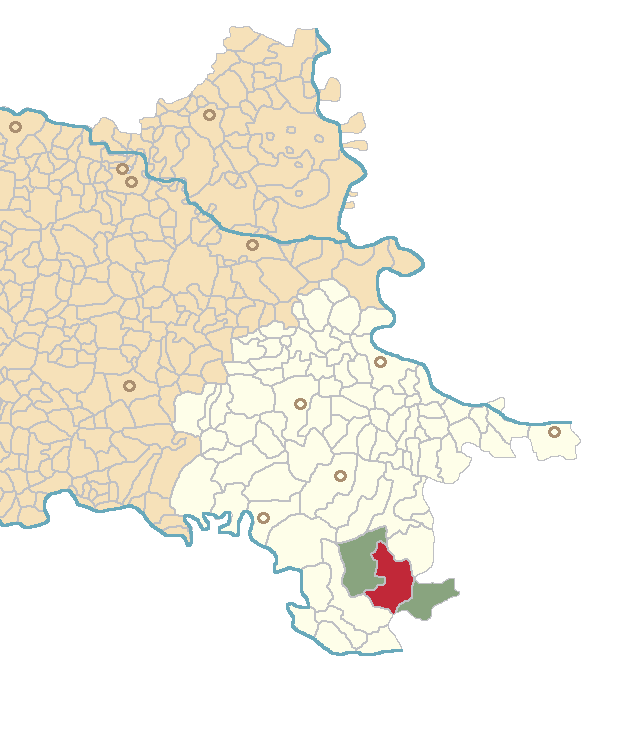
- Map of Soljani within the municipality and the county

- Location within Vukovar-Syrmia County Location within Croatia Location within Europe
- Coordinates: 44.95°N 18.97°E
- Country: Croatia
- Region: Syrmia (Podunavlje)
- County: Vukovar-Syrmia
- Municipality: Vrbanja

Government
  - Body: Local Committee

Area
  - Total: 26.3 sq mi (68.0 km^{2})

Population (2021)
  - Total: 926
  - Density: 35.3/sq mi (13.6/km^{2})
- Time zone: UTC+1 (CET)
  - Summer (DST): UTC+2 (CEST)

Soljani (Slovak: Soľany) is a village in Cvelferija in the southernmost part of Vukovar-Syrmia County. From the 2011 census the village had a population of 1241 inhabitants.

== Name ==
The name of the village in Croatian is plural.

== History ==
It was first mentioned in 1329 as “Sauly, Sali posessio”, and since then the village name has been connected with the word “salt” (sol means salt in Croatian). During the Roman Empire the village was plotted on the history maps as “Saldis”, and one of the main Roman roads that lead to Sirmium (Sremska Mitrovica) went via Saldis.

The village's greatest development was during the 18th and the 19th century when the Slovaks from Vojvodina and Slovakia settled there. Today their descendants are the biggest minority in the village.

== Geography ==
It is located 25 km southeast of Županja, 18 km east of Brčko (Bosnia).

== Demographics ==
=== Slovaks in Soljani ===
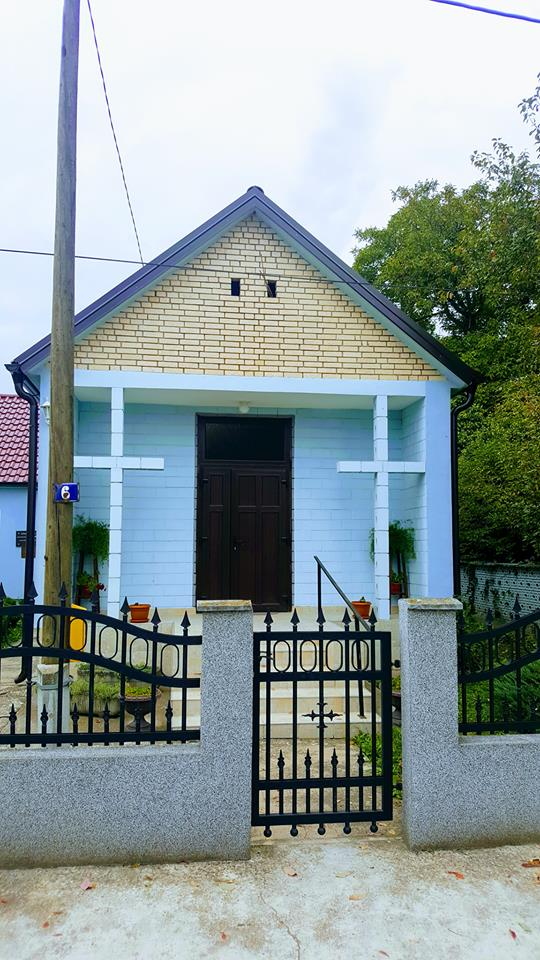
Slovak Evangelical Church

Slovaks settled in the village in the 1830s and 1840s, with an increase in settlement from the 1860s and with the 20th-century settlement of Vojvodina Slovaks from Kisač, Selenča, and Pivnice. Since some of the first settlers were predominantly Roman Catholic, just like the majority of the residents of the village, assimilation process was relatively easy and quick. Subsequent Slovak settlers from Vojvodina were mostly adherents of the Slovak Evangelical Church of the Augsburg Confession with majority of residents who today continually declare themselves as Slovaks belonging to the Evangelical Church. Local Slovak Evangelical parish has around 100 members. Before Soljani Evangelical parish gained its independence in 1911 religious services were provided by Slovak parish in Bingula and by the Slovak Evangelical Church in Šid.

The first Slovak reading room in the village was established in 1932 when the local Slovak football club Zora was established as well. Elementary school in Soljani at the time provided classes in Slovak for 30-40 pupils. Matica slovenská in Soljani was established on 17 October 1993. Alongside cultural links with other Slovaks in Croatia and Serbia, over the years local community developed links with Krnča municipality of the Nitra Region in Slovakia.

== See also ==
- Vukovar-Syrmia County
- Cvelferija
