= Posavski Podgajci =

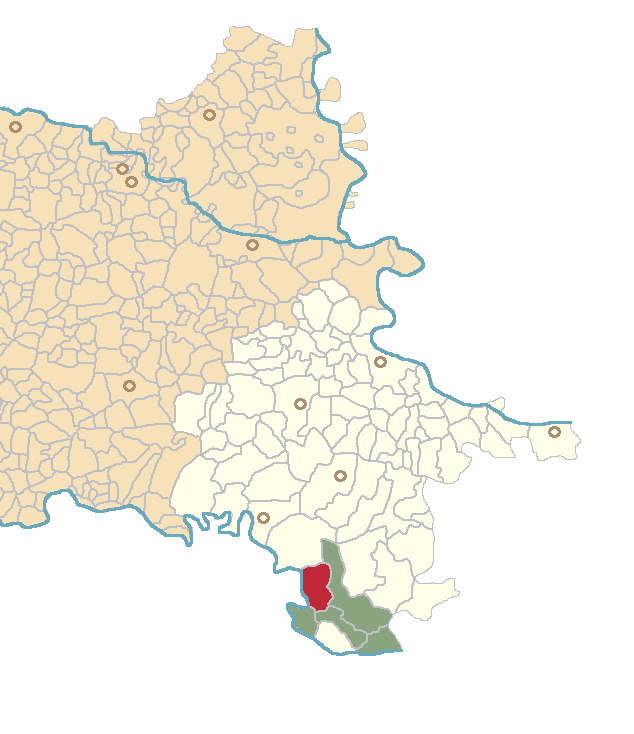

- Coordinates: 44.947442°N 18.831271°E
- Country: Croatia
- County: Vukovar-Syrmia
- Municipality: Drenovci

Area
  - Total: 42.5 km^{2} (16.4 sq mi)

Population (2021)
  - Total: 883
  - Density: 20.8/km^{2} (53.8/sq mi)

Posavski Podgajci is a village in eastern Croatia located west of Drenovci, near the border with Bosnia and Herzegovina. The population is 1,255 (census 2011).

== Name ==
The name of the village in Croatian is plural.

== See also ==
- Vukovar-Syrmia County
- Cvelferija
